= Derald Brackmann =

Pioneering American otologist and neurotologist

Derald E. Brackmann is an American otologist and neurotologist known for his contributions to the treatment of acoustic neuromas and neurofibromatosis type II. His clinical practice and research is at the House Clinic in Los Angeles, where he has contributed to advances in otologic and neurotologic surgery. With John House, he developed the House-Brackmann score, which measures facial nerve efficacy. He pioneered auditory brainstem implant surgery.

== Early life and education ==
Brackmann was born in a small town in central Illinois in 1937. He completed his undergraduate studies at the University of Illinois and earned his medical degree from the University of Illinois College of Medicine in 1962. Following a year of internship and residency in Chicago, he served as a flight surgeon in the United States Air Force from 1964 to 1966.

== Medical career ==
After his military service, Brackmann completed a residency in otolaryngology at the University of Southern California, finishing in 1970. He then pursued a fellowship in neurotology at the House Clinic (then House Ear Clinic), where he has remained throughout his professional life.

Brackmann has authored or co-authored over 300 scientific publications and has edited or co-edited several textbooks, including:

- Neurological Surgery of the Ear and Skull Base
- Otologic Surgery.

His research interests include the management of neurofibromatosis type II and the development of auditory brainstem implants.

== Professional affiliations and honors ==
Brackmann has served as president of multiple professional societies, including the American Academy of Otolaryngology-Head and Neck Surgery, the American Otologic Society, the American Neurotology Society, and the Triological Society. He has received numerous awards, such as the Medical Alumnus of the Year from the University of Illinois and the Award of Merit from the American Otologic Society.
