= The House Institute Foundation =

Californian non-profit to advance hearing science

Coordinates: 34.0626°N 118.2736°W

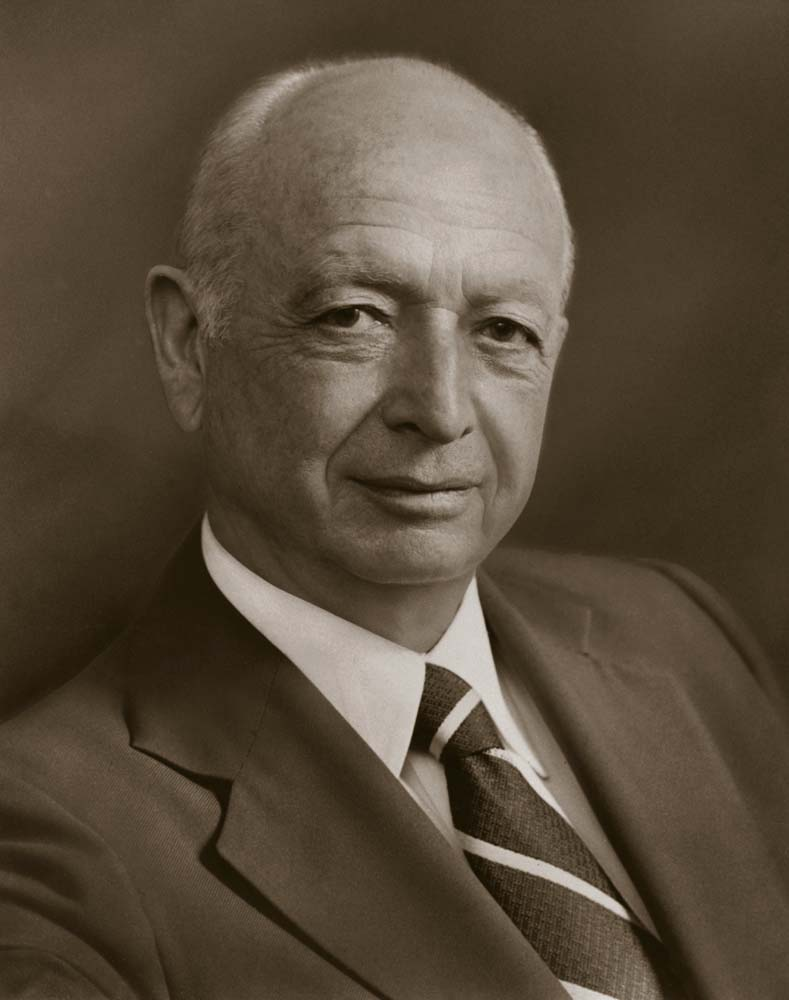
Howard P. House, founder

The House Institute Foundation (HIF), formerly the House Ear Institute, is a non-profit 501(c)(3) organization, based in Los Angeles, California, and dedicated to advancing hearing science through research, education, and global hearing health to improve quality of life.

== History ==
Established in 1946 by Howard P. House, as the Los Angeles Foundation of Otology, and later renamed for its founder, the House Institute Foundation has been engaged in the scientific exploration of the auditory system from the ear canal to the cortex of the brain for over 70 years.

Since 1946, the House Institute Foundation has led the way in defining the causes of hearing and balance disorders, improving medical/surgical procedures and prosthetic devices. The Institute's discoveries have helped millions of people receive successful treatments. House Institute Foundation scientists have been involved in many firsts in the fields of otology, neurotology, skull base surgery, implantable auditory prostheses, and electrophysiology. They have developed techniques to improve hearing aids, diagnostic audiology, and clinical treatments for hearing loss. House Institute researchers have always worked with the House Clinic physicians to integrate medicine and science through clinical and research trials that directly benefit patients.

In 1969, William F. House, M.D.—brother of Howard—implanted the first three patients with the cochlear implant at House Institute Foundation.

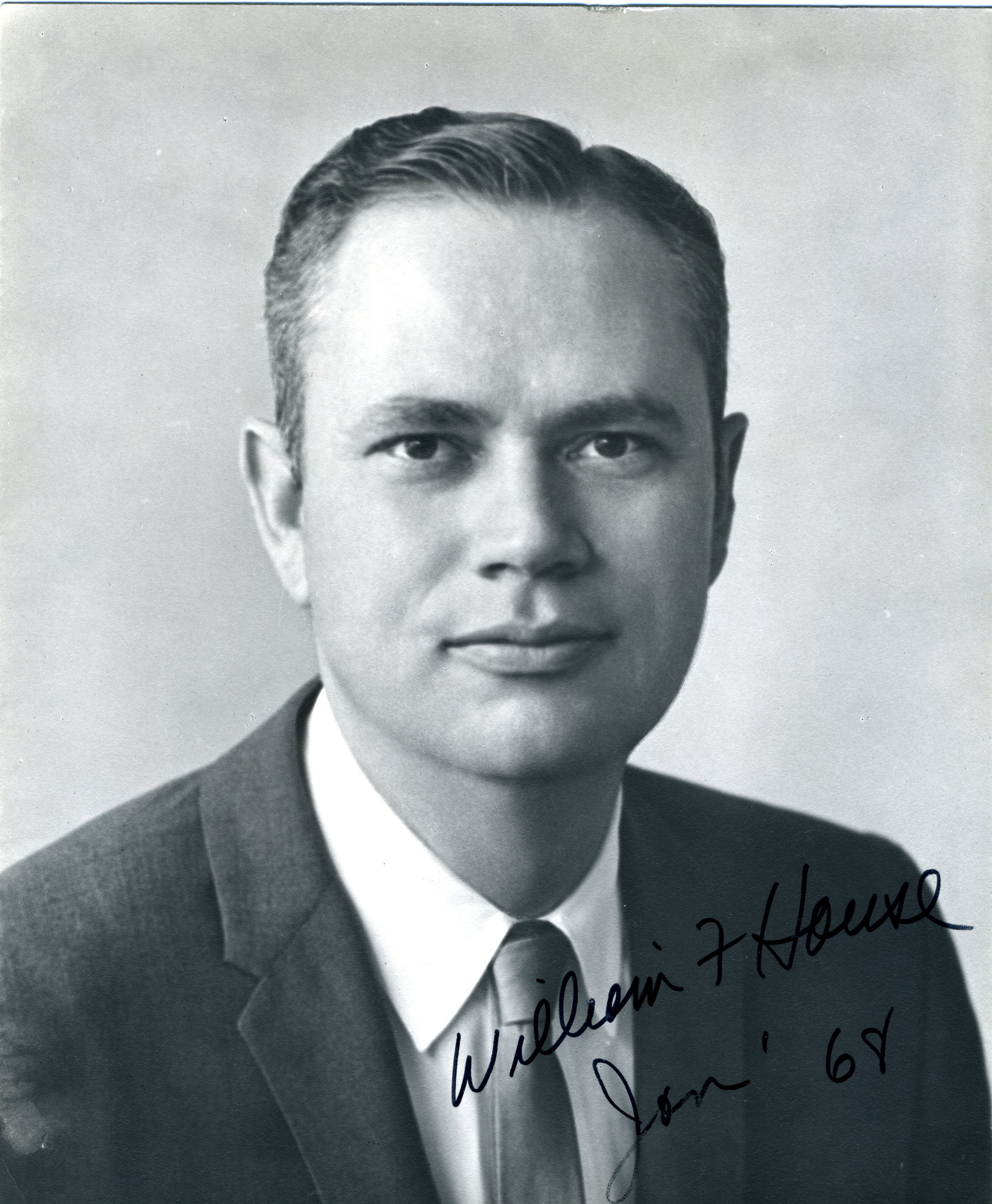
William F. House

Since then, the Institute has been regarded as the world's foremost private research institute for otology and hearing science.

House Institute Foundation's historical advancements in hearing sciences include the development of the first clinically useful cochlear implant and auditory brainstem implant as well as the introduction of the first the middle cranial fossa and then the translabyrinthine approach for removal of acoustic neuromas. The translabyrinthine approach uses the operating microscope and reduced mortality rates from 40% (in California) to less than 1%. It has also developed a variety of diagnostic tests, including the Hearing In Noise Test (HINT), the first hearing test that measures an individual's functional hearing ability in everyday environments where background noise is present, the ABaer screening device for detecting hearing loss in infants, and the Stacked ABR, a highly accurate screening device to detect the presence or absence of acoustic neuromas.

The Institute shares its knowledge with the scientific and medical communities as well as the general public through its education and global hearing health programs. House Clinic physicians have volunteered their time to teach specialty courses in the House Institute Foundation's professional education programs, attended by more than 22,000 doctors and research fellows since 1946 through the visiting physicians program. Through one week surgical temporal bone courses, thousands of doctors from every continent have come to study ear surgery.

In June 2014, House Ear Institute went through bankruptcy proceedings and reorganization. The House Clinic Foundation, which acquired the House Ear Institute, reorganized the structure of the nonprofit organization and established it again as the House Institute Foundation in 2019. The threefold mission of the House Institute Foundation centered on Education, Research, and Global Hearing Health. The Education projects of the Institute include the Neurotology Clinical Fellowship program performed in conjunction with the House Clinic; the Visiting Physicians program for worldwide doctors interested in ear surgery; and the Temporal Bone Surgical Dissection Courses; and an annual audiology symposium. In October 2026, HIF returned to its legacy name: House Ear Institute, in honor of 80 years of innovation and patient care.

Research at the House Institute Foundation currently involves collaborative research in the areas of Hearing Science (Dr. Sig Soli and collaborators), Auditory Implants (through collaboration with researchers at UCLA and Huntington Medical Research Institutes), and support of ongoing clinical trials performed by the House Clinic physicians and collaborators. Clinical and translational research projects are given high priority, with a focus on developing treatments that will directly benefit patients.

Global Hearing Health is a new focus of HIF, through its own efforts in humanitarian otology (Neurotology Clinical Fellows spend a rotation on humanitarian worldwide otology) and through a collaboration with Global ENT Outreach. HIF partners also with the international arm of the American Academy of Otolaryngology Foundation, through the humanitarian committee, the Panamerican committee, and efforts by individual HIF scientists and physicians. Ongoing collaborative global health projects are underway in China, Ecuador, Peru, Malawi, and Paraguay.
