= Imitation of Christ (designs) =

Conceptual art project and fashion line

Imitation
- Formerly: Imitation of Christ
- Industry: Fashion
- Founded: 2000; Los Angeles, California, U.S.
- Founder: Tara Subkoff; Matthew Damhave
- Owner: Tara Subkoff (2001–2007; 2012–present); Josh Sparks (2007–2008)

Imitation of Christ is a conceptual art project and fashion label started by former American art students Matthew Damhave and Tara Subkoff. The project initially began as an art collective, evolving into a fashion line made up of entirely recycled pieces of clothing, which Subkoff and others hand-sewed. The group enacted "guerrilla"-style fashion shows, with models including Scarlett Johansson and Chloë Sevigny.

In 2007, Subkoff sold the brand, but re-adopted it under the shortened title Imitation in 2012.

== History ==
=== Original conception: 2000–2006 ===
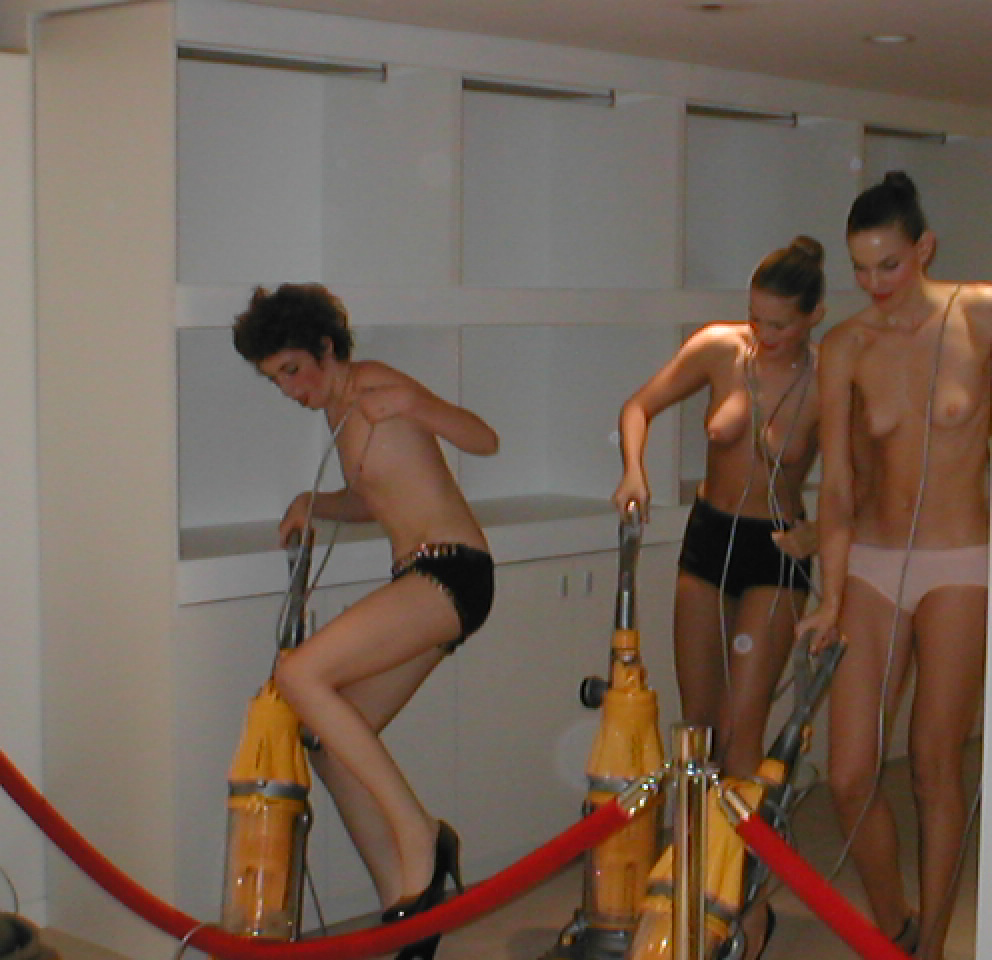
Exhibition in 2002, which featured topless models vacuuming carpets

Originally conceived as an art collective in 2000, Imitation of Christ was founded by former art students Tara Subkoff and Matthew Damhave. Subkoff had dropped out of art school and had worked as an actress prior to forming the project. The project, according to Subkoff, was quickly "confused" by many to be a fashion line, which led to the pair designing a total of four collections together before Damhave left the project in 2001. Named after the fifteenth-century devotional text of the same name, as well as a Psychedelic Furs song, their shows were theatrical, political (one season, they demanded money from guests and donated it to charities), while simultaneously intriguing fashion editors with beautiful clothes. In its earliest forms, Subkoff appointed Chloë Sevigny as the line's creative director. The exhibitions were described as guerrilla in style, with their early shows being held in a funeral parlor in the Manhattan's East Village. Models who wore the pieces for runway shows included actress Scarlett Johansson, and included both men's and women's pieces.

Every piece of clothing in the line was sewn by hand and recycled from vintage, thrift and Goodwill shops. Subkoff created pieces of wearable art with her fashion shows which garnered her a cult following. In reflecting on the line's ethos, Subkoff said:

We were talking about waste, throwing things away, and taking something that's old and making it new again, putting the human hand back into a world that wreaks of manufacturing. It felt very appropriate to do that in 2000. When we started it was such a different time. You could talk about issues like globalization; you could talk about free trade. Then September 11th happened and the entire world changed. Everything became irrelevant. Everything we were saying and doing became so overshadowed by fear and false patriotism.

=== Hiatus; sale of company: 2005–2008 ===
In 2005, it was reported that Subkoff had put the company, which was operating under the fashion label Opening Ceremony, on hiatus. In retrospect, Subkoff said: "There was a massive amount of confusion about its original incarnation. The name got so big, and it appeared to be such a giant success, but like most things that are artistic and creative and amazing, it was never this financial powerhouse. It was an art project." According to Subkoff, she had to work four other jobs, including a shoe collaboration with Easy Spirit and consulting for Sara Lee Apparel in order to keep the company financially afloat.

Between 2006 and 2007, the label was sold to Josh Sparks, former CEO of the Australian brand Sass & Bide, for a reported $2 million, but went under within a year. In 2008, it was reported that Subkoff had wanted to re-purchase the label after it went bankrupt.

=== Re-branding: 2011–present ===
In 2011, after recovering from extensive brain surgery after being diagnosed with an acoustic neuroma, Subkoff announced that she would be reviving the label independently, bringing it back to its "most basic incarnation: easy-to-wear staples with an edge." She also stated that she had shortened the name of the label to Imitation. She released a short film showcasing new pieces she'd designed in 2011. The re-launched Imitation label held its first fashion show in 2012.

== See also ==
- Sustainable fashion
- Anti-fashion
