= Tara Subkoff =

American actress (born 1972)

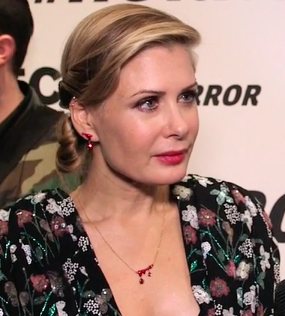
- Subkoff interviewed by Behind the Velvet Rope TV at 2015 special screening of #Horror
- Born: December 10, 1972 (age 53); Westport, Connecticut, U.S.
- Occupations: Artist; fashion designer; actress; director
- Years active: 1993–present
- Spouse: Urs Fischer (m. 2014–2016)
- Children: 1

Tara Lyn Subkoff (born December 10, 1972) is an American actress, conceptual artist, director, and fashion designer.

Raised in Connecticut, Subkoff relocated to Los Angeles in 1991, enrolling at the Otis College of Art and Design before pursuing an acting career. She made her film debut in the thriller When the Bough Breaks (1994) opposite Martin Sheen, and later had supporting roles in As Good as It Gets (1997), The Last Days of Disco (1998), The Cell (2000), and The Notorious Bettie Page (2005).

In 2000, she shifted her focus from acting to co-found the conceptual art collective Imitation of Christ, a project featuring pieces hand-sewn solely from recycled vintage and thrift store clothing. In 2015, she made her feature film directorial debut with the horror film #Horror (2015), which was picked up for distribution by IFC Midnight.

== Early life ==
Subkoff was born December 10, 1972 in Westport, Connecticut. Her father was an antiques dealer who owned an antique store on 13th Street in Manhattan, and her mother was a schoolteacher in East Harlem. She and her younger brother, Daniel, grew up in Westport in what she described as a "bohemian" family. She was raised in the Roman Catholic faith; one of her aunts was a nun.

Subkoff attended boarding school at the Williston Northampton School in Massachusetts. After graduating, she relocated to Los Angeles in 1991, where she enrolled in the Otis College of Art and Design, but dropped out within a year of enrolling. She subsequently began taking acting classes alongside Angelina Jolie and Keanu Reeves.

== Career ==
=== 1994–2000: Early acting work ===
Subkoff made her debut as an actress on television, appearing in Dr. Quinn, Medicine Woman in 1994, followed by her feature film debut, a lead role in the 1994 crime thriller When the Bough Breaks, opposite Martin Sheen and Ron Perlman. In 1996, she had a minor supporting part in the film Freeway, and in the horror film Black Circle Boys (1997).

This was followed with lead roles in the drama All Over Me (1997), and the comedy Lover Girl (1997), co-starring Kristy Swanson. She had minor parts in As Good as It Gets (1997), Whit Stillman's The Last Days of Disco (1998), and an uncredited appearance in the 1999 teen sex comedy American Pie. She also appeared in a supporting role in Tarsem Singh's directorial debut The Cell (2000), a science fiction horror film in which she played a captive victim of a serial killer (Vincent D'Onofrio) pursued by two detectives (played by Jennifer Lopez and Vince Vaughn).

In 2017, Subkoff joined the group of women making the Harvey Weinstein sexual abuse allegations, saying that the producer had sexually harassed her in the 1990s when she applied for a role in one of his films, and then had her blacklisted when she resisted. "It became impossible for me to get work as an actress after this, so I then had to start a new career path and started Imitation of Christ", she said.

=== 2001–2011: Imitation of Christ ===
In 2000, Subkoff shifted from acting and began working on a conceptual art project called Imitation of Christ with designer Matt Damhave, enlisting Chloë Sevigny as the project's creative director. The project has been described as a "DIY art collective misconstrued as a luxury fashion label." It took its name from Thomas à Kempis's fifteenth-century Christian devotional text of the same name, as well as a Psychedelic Furs song. Every piece of clothing in the line was sewn by hand and recycled from vintage, thrift and Goodwill shops. Subkoff created pieces of wearable art with fashion shows which garnered her a cult following. Models who wore the pieces for runway shows included actress Scarlett Johansson. Reflecting on the line, Subkoff said: “We were talking about waste, throwing things away, and taking something that's old and making it new again, putting the human hand back into a world that reeks of manufacturing. It felt very appropriate to do that in 2000."

Subkoff and Damhave created four collections together, and the shows were described as "guerilla-style, at least as much performance art as they were about [Subkoff's] refashioned, hand-sewn vintage clothes," with the project's earliest exhibitions taking place in a funeral parlor in the Manhattan's East Village. In 2003, she also collaborated with Bernhard Willhelm on a fashion collection inspired and authorized by Roberto Capucci.

After Subkoff and Damhave parted ways, she continued to design pieces for the line through 2006. In 2007, Subkoff sold the label to Josh Sparks, the former chief executive of the Australian label Sass & Bide, for a reported $2 million. The following year, in 2008, the label went out of business. That same year, Subkoff created four capsule collections for the women's fashion brand Bebe. The collections were successful, selling out within days, but Subkoff later reflected that she was dissatisfied with the collection, saying: "I missed the larger ideas," she said. “I missed creating art."

=== 2012–present: Directing and other projects ===
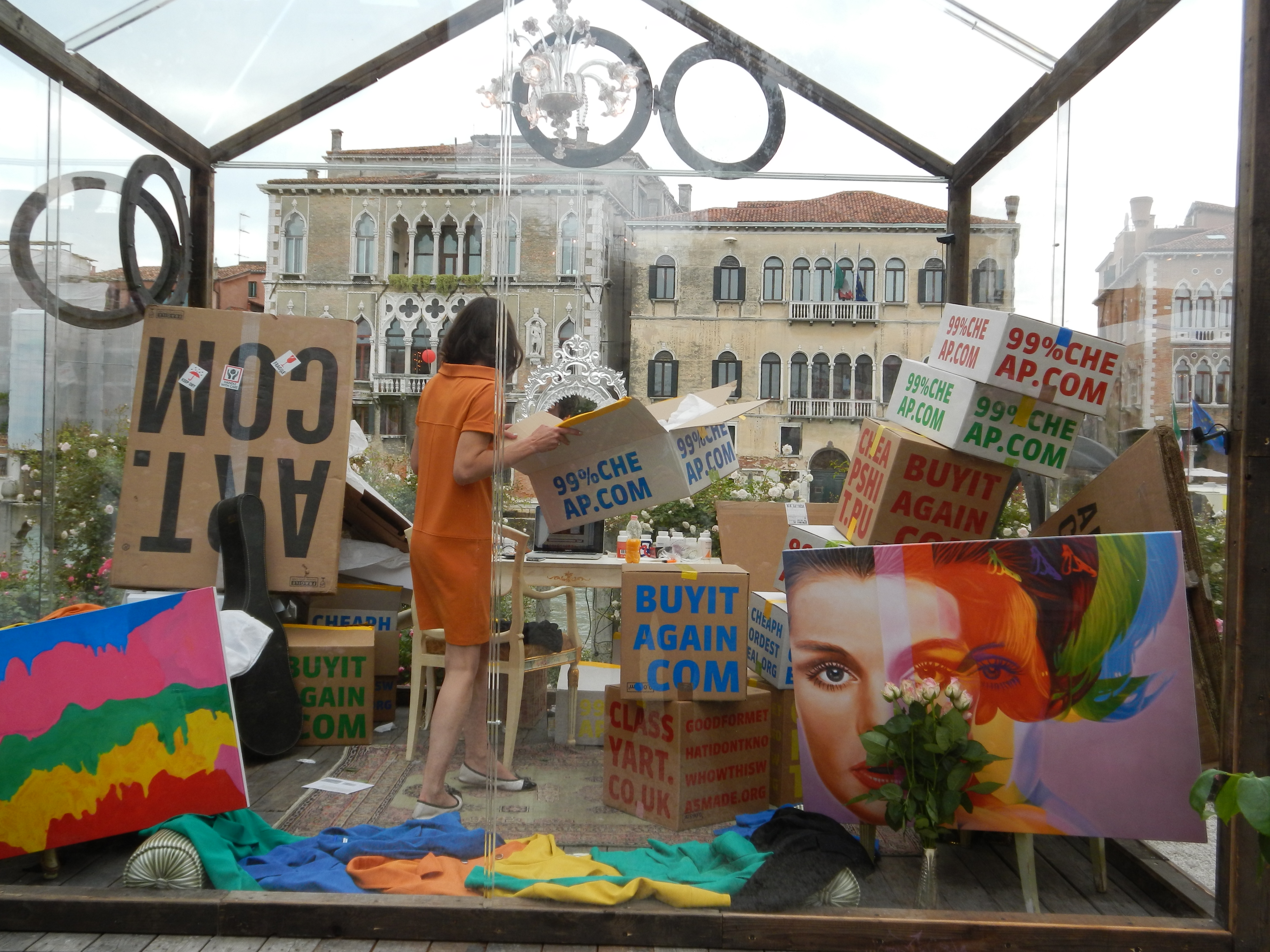
Milla Jovovich in Subkoff's art installation Future/Perfect, 2013

In 2012, Subkoff revived the Imitation of Christ label and began working on more pieces, shortening the brand name to simply "Imitation." The same year, she created a ten-day art installation and continuous performance piece at the Carlton Festival of the Arts in São Paulo, Brazil. She also conceptualized a performance piece in a group show curated by Dimitri Antonitsis in Hydra, Greece.

She exhibited a three hour-long installation at the Bortolami Gallery in New York City during the 2012 New York Fashion Week titled "This is Not a Fashion Show," which featured a girl's choir in leotards performing “Carol of the Bells” (intimated as a "slight to Yuletide consumerism") and "performers aging from 8 to 70 pruned and posing in front of antique mirrors lining the gallery walls." In explaining the idea behind the show, Subkoff said: "We are a society that only sells commodities. We do not create anything unless it's to be bought and sold, so the idea of doing something where there isn't a commodity to sell, or what the commodity is to sell is very confusing, is extremely interesting to me."

In 2013, she collaborated with Milla Jovovich on a filmed installation in Venice, Italy titled Future/Perfect, which had Jovovich enclosed in a glass house, surrounded by boxes with consumer logos, artwork, and clothing. Though working predominantly in art, Subkoff also had small roles in several films, including Tanner Hall (2009), How Do You Know, and the horror film Abandoned (2010), with Brittany Murphy.

Subkoff made her directorial debut with the horror film #Horror (2015), which details a group of wealthy adolescent girls who experience a night of violence and terror after a social media game is tinged with cyberbullying. The film was screened out of competition at the 2015 Cannes Film Festival, and was picked up for distribution by IFC Midnight and given a limited theatrical release in November 2015. According to Subkoff, she conceived the film after a conversation she'd had with her friend's daughter: "[The idea] started because I asked my friend's daughter, "What is horror, to you?" This girl was cyberbullied very badly... Now, I was bullied badly as a kid, but I could always change schools. I could always go home. Now you can't...when bullying follows you home, and there's no escape and no end, to me, that's horror. And to so many girls, that's just life." The film received mixed reviews from critics.

In November 2019, Subkoff exhibited a multimedia art installation at the Museum of Modern Art. The following year, she revived the Imitation of Christ project, holding a show at Garvanza Park in Los Angeles. In the spring of 2023, she exhibited an interactive multimedia performance featuring various artists, titled "‘WHAT IS COMING AND WHAT IS GOING", in Los Angeles.

== Personal life ==
Subkoff has been romantically linked to Wes Anderson, Anton Newcombe, and was formerly engaged to director Tom Hooper. In the fall of 2014, Subkoff married artist Urs Fischer. The couple gave birth to a daughter, Grace, in 2016, before divorcing the same year. Subkoff resides in Los Angeles, California, where she bought a three-story house designed by architect Saul Harris Brown in the Silver Lake neighborhood for $2.25 million in 2021.

In 2009, Subkoff was diagnosed with an acoustic neuroma, a benign brain tumor that required her to undergo a translabrynthine craniotomy in September 2009. Her symptoms, which included chronic headaches, bouts of dizziness, and unilateral hearing loss, had originally been diagnosed in 2003 as stemming from TMJ. At the time of the tumor diagnosis, Subkoff had mainly been working as a freelance artist, and as a result, her health insurance policy through the Screen Actors Guild had lapsed. In order to reinstate her health insurance policy in order to undergo the operation, she took small roles in the films Abandoned and How Do You Know.

== Filmography ==
=== Film ===
Year	Film	Role	Notes	Ref.
1994	When the Bough Breaks	Jordan Thomas/Jennifer Lynn Eben		
1995	Point Dume	Angela Wallis		
1996	Freeway	Sharon		
1997	Black Circle Boys	Chloe		
1997	All Over Me	Ellen		
1997	Lover Girl	Jake Ferrari / "Candy"		
1997	As Good as It Gets	Cafe 24 Waitress		
1998	The Last Days of Disco	Holly		
1999	Mascara	Daphne		
1999	American Pie	College girl	Uncredited	
2000	The Cell	Julia Hickson		
2002	Teenage Caveman	Sarah		
2002	Looking for Jimmy			
2003	Undermind	Anya		
2004	Wake Up, Ron Burgundy: The Lost Movie	Mouse		
2005	The Notorious Bettie Page	June		
2009	Tanner Hall	Gwen		
2010	Abandoned	Nurse Anna		
2010	How Do You Know	Subpoena Girl		
2010	Tyrolean Riviera	Brigitta	Short film	
2011	For Lovers Only	Yves' Wife		
2013	Sugar	Woman at accident		
2015	Cook-Off!	Mayor's Assistant		
2015	#Horror	Tatiana	Voice only	
2021	Grace and Grit	Linda Conger		

=== Television ===
Year	Film	Role	Notes	Ref.
1994	Dr. Quinn, Medicine Woman	Jennifer	Episode: "Orphan Train"	
1994	Northern Exposure	Mary-Margaret	Episode: "The Letter"	
1996	Kindred: The Embraced	Cash's Girl	Episode: "The Original Saga"	
1996	True Crime	Liz McConnell	Television film	
2013	Kroll Show	Tara Ess	Two episodes	

=== Music videos ===
Year	Title	Artist	Notes	Ref.
2004	"Good Boys"	Blondie		

=== As director or producer ===
Year	Film	Role	Notes	Ref.
2010	The Killer Inside Me	Associate producer		
2012	Magic Hour	Director	Short film	
2013	Future/Perfect	Director	Short film	
2015	#Horror	Director, writer, producer, production designer		
