= Auditory brainstem implant =

- Anatomical landmarks in auditory brainstem implant surgery

An auditory brainstem implant (ABI) is a surgically implanted electronic device that provides a sense of sound to a person who is profoundly deaf, due to retrocochlear hearing impairment (due to illness or injury damaging the cochlea or auditory nerve, and so precluding the use of a cochlear implant). In Europe, ABIs have been used in children and adults, and in patients with neurofibromatosis type II.

== History ==
The auditory brainstem implant was first developed in 1979 by William F. House, a neuro-otologist associated with the House Ear Institute, for patients with neurofibromatosis type 2 (NF2). House's original ABI consisted of two ball electrodes that were implanted near the surface of the cochlear nucleus on the brainstem. In 1997, Robert Behr at the University of Wurzburg, Germany, performed an ABI implantation using a 12-electrode array implant with an audio processor based on the MED-EL C40+ cochlear implant. The first pediatric ABI implantation was performed by Vittorio Colletti from Verona, Italy, in 1999.

In contrast to cochlear implants, ABI implantation is relatively rare. By 2010, there were only 500 patients worldwide who had undergone implantation.

== Parts ==
An ABI system consists of an internal part (the implant) and an external part (the audio processor or sound processor). It is similar in design and function to a cochlear implant.

The external audio processor is worn on or behind the ear. It contains at least one microphone, which picks up sound signals from the environment. The audio processor converts these signals into digital signals and sends them to the coil. The coil transmits the signals through the skin to the implant below.

The internal implant sends the signals to the electrode array. The design of the electrode array is the key difference between a cochlear implant and an ABI. Whereas the electrode array for a CI is wire-shaped and is inserted into the cochlea, the electrode array of an ABI is paddle-shaped and is placed on the cochlear nucleus of the brainstem. By stimulating the brainstem, the ABI sends the sound signals to the brain, allowing the patient to perceive sound.

== Indications ==
=== Neurofibromatosis Type 2 ===
Until 2018, ABI was only indicated for patients with Neurofibromatosis Type 2 (NF2). NF2 is a genetic disorder that is characterised by the development of non-cancerous tumours along the nervous system. These vestibular schwannomas (also known as acoustic neuromas) often form on the auditory nerve, and surgical removal of these NF2 tumours can damage the auditory nerve and limiting the patient's ability to hear.

NF2 generally presents in adolescence or young adulthood, so candidacy was previously limited to patients aged 15 years or older, with NF2 and bilateral non-functioning auditory nerves.

=== Other indications ===
In Europe and other countries, ABI is CE-marked and approved for patients 12 months and older who cannot benefit from a cochlear implant due to non-functional auditory nerves. This includes both congenital and accrued etiologies, including:

- Auditory nerve aplasia
- Auditory nerve hypoplasia
- Head trauma
- Non-NF2 tumours
- Severe cochlear ossification

The US FDA approved clinical trials of ABIs for children in 2013. A handful of medical centres, including New York University, are undergoing feasibility studies in the pediatric population.

== Surgery ==
ABI implantation requires a craniotomy and is therefore much more complex than CI surgery. It is normally performed by both a neurosurgeon and an ENT surgeon together, who insert the electrode array through the fourth ventricle onto the surface of the cochlear nucleus.

For patients with NF2, the surgeon will spend a significant amount of time removing the acoustic neuroma tumours before inserting the implant. Depending upon the surgical approach, this may involve sacrificing the auditory nerve, thus rendering the patient deaf. Patients with NF2, who undergo both tumour removal and implantation in the same surgery, generally experience a longer post-op stay than patients without NF2.

== Outcomes ==
Speech perception outcomes with an ABI are generally poorer than those reported in cochlear implant multichannel CI users. Most patients are able to detect the presence of environmental sounds and speech. Speech understanding gradually improves during the first three years after activation, and most patients experience better speech understanding using a combination of lip-reading and the ABI, as opposed to lip-reading alone. However, most patients are unable to understand speech using only their ABI.

There are two reasons that could explain the difference in outcomes between cochlear implants and ABIs. Firstly, non-auditory side-effects, such as vertigo, limit the overall number of electrodes that can deliver useful frequency information. Electrodes found to cause one of these side-effects are deactivated, resulting in fewer signals reaching the brain. In addition, the brainstem is unable to offer the same tonotopic range as the cochlea. With a cochlear implant, the electrodes positioned in the basal end of the cochlea elicit a higher pitch sensation than those positioned in the apical end. In contrast, the tonotopic map within the cochlear nucleus runs parallel and obliquely through the nucleus and the ABI positioned on the surface does not stimulate neural structures in such a clear, tonotopically ordered way. This makes it harder to achieve optimal results during fitting.

Patients without NF2 tend to experience better speech outcomes with an ABI than those with NF2. A study by Colletti found that a significant number of patients without NF2 were able to understand speech with an ABI, including effortless telephone use. It is believed that the tumours caused by the NF2 damage specialised cells in the cochlear nucleus important for speech perception.

There is some evidence to suggest that ABI can help to reduce the effect of tinnitus and improve quality of life. Better language outcomes are also expected with younger children implanted before the age of 2. Because of the wide range of possible outcomes, it is crucial that patients and/or their parents are counselled effectively about what they can realistically expect from an ABI. Parents are advised about additional communication modalities available, such as the use of sign language, as the ultimate goal is to facilitate language with the child.

== See also ==
- Brain implant
- Cochlear implant
