= By Appointment Only =

By Appointment Only may refer to:

- By Appointment Only (1933 film)
- By Appointment Only (2007 film)
