= Cerebellopontine angle syndrome =

- Types: neurology

The cerebellopontine angle syndrome is a distinct neurological syndrome of deficits that can arise due to the closeness of the cerebellopontine angle to specific cranial nerves. Indications include unilateral hearing loss (85%), speech impediments, disequilibrium, tremors or other loss of motor control. The cerebellopontine angle cistern is a subarachnoid cistern formed by the cerebellopontine angle that lies between the cerebellum and the pons. It is filled with cerebrospinal fluid and is a common site for the growth of acoustic neuromas or schwannomas.

== Signs and symptoms ==
Tumors within the nerve canaliculi initially present with unilateral sensorineural hearing loss, unilateral tinnitus, or disequilibrium (vertigo is rare, on account of the slow growth of neuromas). Speech discrimination out of proportion to hearing loss, difficulty talking on the telephone are frequent accompaniments. Tumors extending into the CPA will likely present with disequilibrium or ataxia depending on the amount of extension on the brainstem. With brainstem extension, midfacial and corneal hyperesthesia, hydrocephalus, and other cranial neuropathies become more prevalent. Involvement of CN V from a cerebellopontine mass lesion often results in loss of the ipsilateral (same side of the body) corneal reflex, or involuntary blink.

Patients with larger tumours can develop Bruns nystagmus ('dancing eyes') due to compression of the flocculi.

== Causes ==
In most cases, the cause of acoustic neuromas is unknown. The only statistically significant risk factor for developing an acoustic neuroma is having a rare genetic condition called neurofibromatosis type 2 (NF2). There are no confirmed environmental risk factors for acoustic neuroma. There are conflicting studies on the association between acoustic neuromas and cellular phone use and repeated exposure to loud noise. In 2011, an arm of the World Health Organization released a statement listing cell phone use as a low grade cancer risk. The Acoustic Neuroma Association recommends that cell phone users use a hands-free device.

Meningiomas are significantly more common in women than in men; they are most common in middle-aged women. Two predisposing factors associated with meningiomas for which at least some evidence exists are exposure to ionizing radiation (cancer treatment of brain tumors) and hormone replacement therapy.

== Pathophysiology ==
Various kinds of tumors, usually primary and benign, are represented in the pathology. Lesions in the area of cerebellopontine angle cause signs and symptoms secondary to compression of nearby cranial nerves, including cranial nerve V (trigeminal), cranial nerve VII (facial), and cranial nerve VIII (vestibulocochlear). The most common cerebellopontine angle (CPA) tumor is a vestibular schwannoma affecting cranial nerve VIII (80%), followed by meningioma (10%). The cranial nerves affected are (from most common to least common) : VIII (cochlear component), VIII (vestibular component), V

- Acoustic neuroma/vestibular schwannoma
- Meningioma, a tumor of the meninges or membranes that surround the nerves passing through the CPA
- Cerebellar astrocytoma, a malignant tumor of star-shaped glial cells called astrocytes in the cerebellum
- Intracranial epidermoid cyst
- Lipoma
- Glomus jugulare associated with the glossopharyngeal nerve
- Idiopathic hypertrophic pachymeningitis
- IgG4-related hypertrophic pachymeningitis
- CPA Metastases in cancer patients with inner ear symptoms (rare)

== Diagnosis ==
=== Radiography ===
Subsequent to diagnosis of sensorineural hearing loss, and differential diagnosis of retrocochlear or neural etiologies, radiological assessment of the CPA is performed to assess the presence of anatomical retrocochlear lesions.

=== Traditional protocols ===
Before the advent of MRI, electronystagmography and Computed Tomography were employed for diagnosis of acoustic neuroma.

=== Auditory brainstem response audiometry and adjunct tests ===
The auditory brainstem response (ABR) test gives information about the inner ear (cochlea) and nerve pathways for hearing via ongoing electrical activity in the brain measured by electrodes placed on the scalp. Five different waves (I to V) are measured for each ear. Each waveform represents specific anatomical points along the auditory neural pathway. Delays of one side relative to the other suggest a lesion in cranial nerve VIII between the ear and brainstem or in the brainstem itself. The most reliable indicator for acoustic neuromas from the ABR is the interaural latency differences in wave V: the latency in the impaired ear is prolonged. Different studies have indicated the sensitivity of ABR for detection of acoustic neuromas 1 cm or larger to be between 90 and 95%. Sensitivity for neuromas smaller than 1 cm are 63-77%. A newer technology, stacked ABR, may have sensitivity as high as 95% with specificity 88% for smaller tumors. ABR is considerably more cost effective, but MRI provides more information.

Stapedius reflex (SR) and caloric vestibular response (CVR) are non-invasive otologic tests for auditory neural function. These are not primary diagnostics for CPA neuromas, and are usually used in conjunction with ABR.

=== Magnetic resonance imaging ===
Several different types of magnetic resonance imaging (MRI) may be employed in diagnosis: MRI without contrast, Gd contrast enhanced T1-weighted MRI (GdT1W) or T2-weighted enhanced MRI (T2W or T2*W). Non-contrast enhanced MRI is considerably less expensive than any of the contrast enhanced MRI scans. The gold standard in diagnosis is GdT1W MRI. The reliability of non-contrast enhanced MRI is highly dependent on the sequence of scans, and the experience of the operator.

== Management ==
Acoustic neuromas are managed by either surgery, radiation therapy, or observation with regular MRI scanning. With treatment, the likelihood of hearing preservation varies inversely with the size of the tumor; for large tumors, preservation of hearing is rare. Because acoustic neuromas, meningiomas and most other CPA tumors are benign, slow growing or non-growing, and non-invasive, observation is a viable management option.

=== Stereotactic radiosurgery ===
The objective of irradiation is to halt the growth of the acoustic neuroma tumour, it does not excise it from the body, as the term 'radiosurgery' or 'gammaknife' implies. Radiosurgery is only suitable for small to medium size tumors.

=== Surgical ===
There are three modalities of surgical treatment (excision) depending on where the anatomical location of the incision to access the tumor is made: retrosigmoid (a variant of what was formerly called suboccipital), translabyrinthine, and middle fossa.

The goals of surgery are to control the tumor, and preserve hearing as well as facial nerves. Especially in the case of larger tumors, there may be a tradeoff between tumor removal and preservation of nerve functionality. There are different defined degrees of surgical excision, termed 'subtotal resection', 'radical subtotal resection', 'near-total resection', and 'total resection' in order or increasing proportion of tumor removed. Lesser amount of tumor removal may increase likelihood of preservation of nerve function (hence better post-operative hearing), but also likelihood of tumor regrowth, necessitating additional treatment.

==== Outcome and complications ====
The overall complication rate following surgery is around 20%; cerebrospinal fluid leak is the most common.

== See also ==
- Cerebellum
- Pons
