= Translabyrinthine approach =

The translabyrinthine approach is a surgical approach to treating serious disorders of the cerebellopontine angle, (CPA), which is the most common location of posterior fossa tumors. especially acoustic neuroma. In this approach, the semicircular canals and vestibule, including the utricle and the saccule of the inner ear are removed, causing complete hearing loss in the operated ear. The procedure is typically performed by a team of surgeons, including a neurotologist (an ear, nose, and throat surgeon specializing in skull base surgery) as well as a neurosurgeon.

== Background ==
The translabyrinthine approach was developed by William F. House, M.D., who began doing dissections in the laboratory with the aid of magnification and subsequently developed the first middle cranial fossa and then the translabyrinthine approach for the removal of acoustic neuroma.

This surgical approach is typically performed by a team of surgeons, including a neurotologist (an ear, nose, and throat surgeon specializing in skull base surgery) as well as a neurosurgeon.

In this approach, the semicircular canals and vestibule, including the utricle and the saccule of the inner ear are removed with a surgical drill, causing complete sensorineural hearing loss in the operated ear. The facial nerve, which innervates the muscles of the face, is preserved in a higher percentage of cases than with other approaches.

Prior to the translabyrinthine approach, in the early 1960s acoustic neuromas were treated utilizing a suboccipital approach without the aid of an operating microscope. With the introduction of the translabyrinthine approach, mortality rates decreased from 40% in the State of California to 1%.
