= Ally Walker =

American actress

- Education: University of California, Santa Cruz; B.S.
- Occupation: Actor
- Years active: 1988–present
- Height: 5 ft 10 in (178 cm)
- Spouse: John Landgraf (m. 1997)
- Children: 3

Ally Walker is an American actress. She made her television debut in the NBC daytime soap opera Santa Barbara (1988) before landing the leading roles on the short-lived dramas True Blue (1989–1990), and Moon Over Miami (1993).

During the 1990s, Walker had roles in films such as Universal Soldier (1992), Singles (1992), When the Bough Breaks (1994), While You Were Sleeping (1995), Kazaam (1996), and Happy, Texas (1999). From 1996 to 1999, she played the leading role of Doctor Samantha Waters in the NBC crime drama series Profiler, for which she received a Saturn Award for Best Actress on Television nomination. She returned to television with a role in the HBO drama series Tell Me You Love Me (2007), and later played villainous Agent June Stahl in the FX crime drama, Sons of Anarchy (2008–2010). Walker also had the leading role in the short-lived Lifetime police drama series The Protector in 2011. During seasons 4 and 5 (2014 and 2015) of Longmire, she played Dr. Donna Monaghan, a therapist treating veterans who is the title character's love interest.

== Early life ==
Walker was born to James Joseph Walker, a physicist, and Louhannah (née Mann) who would become an attorney. She grew up in Santa Fe, New Mexico, where her father worked at the Los Alamos National Laboratory. Originally intending to become a scientist, she attended the University of California, Santa Cruz, where she earned a degree in biochemistry in 1983. While spending a semester at Richmond College of Arts in London, UK, she discovered an interest in performing. After graduation, she worked for a time sequencing DNA at a genetic engineering company, but then sold all her possessions, traveled to Australia, surfed, and worked a series of jobs before returning to Los Angeles. Although she planned to enter medical school, instead she became a model and obtained roles in commercials including as Clairol’s “Nice & Easy Girl”. Her acting career began when she was cast in the film Aloha Summer (1988), but her scene was cut from the final version.

== Career ==
In early 1988, Walker joined the cast of NBC daytime soap opera Santa Barbara, playing Andrea Bedford. Later that year, she began appearing on primetime television. During the 1989–90 television season, she played the female lead in the short-lived NBC crime drama series True Blue. She later guest-starred on Matlock, L.A. Law, and Tales from the Crypt. She starred in the 1991 NBC television movie Perry Mason and the Case of the Fatal Fashion as murderer Julia Collier; the devious daughter of Diana Muldaur's character. In 1993, she starred alongside Billy Campbell in the short-lived ABC comedy-drama, Moon Over Miami.

In 1992, Walker played the female leading role opposite Jean-Claude Van Damme in the science-fiction action film Universal Soldier directed by Roland Emmerich. Later that year, she played Sheila Kelley's grouchy roommate in the Cameron Crowe romantic comedy Singles. Her first star-billed role was in the 1994 thriller When the Bough Breaks. In 1995, she had supporting roles in Sandra Bullock's box-office hit While You Were Sleeping, and Andy García's flop Steal Big Steal Little. The following year, Walker co-starred alongside Shaquille O'Neal in the fantasy comedy film, Kazaam.

In 1996, Walker was listed as one of People's "40 Most Fascinating People on TV". The same year she was cast in the leading role as Doctor Samantha Waters in the NBC crime drama series Profiler, a role for which she received a Saturn Award for Best Actress on Television nomination in 1998, and a Satellite Award for Best Actress – Television Series Drama. Walker starred as the series lead during the first three seasons, but left the show in the fall of 1999. She was replaced by Jamie Luner as a new profiler during the show's final season. Later in 1999, Walker co-starred opposite Steve Zahn in the comedy film Happy, Texas, and played the lead role in the Lifetime television movie, If You Believe.

In 2002, Walker returned to star in and produce the ABC pilot comedy called My Wonderful Life, which was not picked up. In 2005, she released a documentary film For Norman... Wherever You Are as director and producer, which screened at several film festivals. She returned to the New York stage, appearing in a number of Off-Broadway productions. From 2005 to 2010, Walker played many guest roles on television, including Sleeper Cell, ER, The Shield, Boston Legal, Law & Order, CSI: Crime Scene Investigation, Southland, and Law & Order: Special Victims Unit.

In 2007, Walker starred in the HBO drama series about sexual relationships, Tell Me You Love Me. The series was cancelled after a single season. In 2009, she co-starred in films Toe to Toe and Wonderful World opposite Matthew Broderick. From 2008 to 2010, Walker had the recurring role as ATF Agent June Stahl, a major antagonist on the FX crime drama series Sons of Anarchy.

In 2011, Walker played the leading role in the Lifetime police drama series The Protector, which revolves around a single mother who struggles to balance her family and professional life as an LAPD homicide detective. The series was canceled after one season. In 2014, she played the mother of Chyler Leigh's lead character in the short-lived NBC police procedural, Taxi Brooklyn. She made her feature scripted film directing and writing debut with Sex, Death and Bowling starring Selma Blair. In 2015, she was cast in the recurring roles in the Netflix crime drama Longmire, and USA Network thriller, Colony. Most recently she appeared as Captain Ava Lafrey in the short-lived Fox horror-comedy sitcom Ghosted from 2017-2018.

In September 2025, Walker was a guest on the Off the Shelf podcast.

== Bibliography ==
- The Light Runner (2025)

== Personal life ==
On June 14, 1997, Walker married John Landgraf, then a producer for NBC, at her parents' home in Santa Fe, New Mexico. The couple has three sons: Walker, Will, and Cal. She has a sister named Elizabeth and a brother named Jim.

== Filmography ==
=== Film ===
Year	Title	Role	Notes
1988	Aloha Summer		Scenes deleted
1991	Eye of the Storm	Killer Girl	
1991	Ragin' Cajun	Kati	
1992	Universal Soldier	Veronica Roberts	
1992	Singles	Pam	
1993	The Seventh Coin	Lisa	
1994	When the Bough Breaks	Audrey Macleah	
1995	Just Looking	Sherrie	
1995	Someone to Die For	Alex Donaldson	
1995	While You Were Sleeping	Ashley Bartlett Bacon	
1995	Steal Big Steal Little	Bonnie Martin	
1996	Bed of Roses	Wendy	
1996	Kazaam	Alice Connor	
1997	Brittle Glory	Elise Rosen	
1998	Welcome to Hollywood	Herself	
1999	Happy, Texas	Josephine "Joe" McClintock the Banker	
2005	For Norman... Wherever You Are		Documentary; director and producer
2007	By Appointment Only	Val Spencer	Also writer
2009	Toe to Toe	Claire	
2009	Wonderful World	Eliza	
2013	Angel's Perch	Judy	
2013	Mischief Night	Dr. Pomock	
2014	April Rain	Linda	
2015	Sex, Death and Bowling		Director, writer and producer
2020	When We Kill the Creators	Walker	

=== Television ===
Year	Title	Role	Notes
1988	Santa Barbara	Andrea Bedford	Series regular (94 episodes)
1989	Swimsuit	Romella	Television film
1989–1990	True Blue	Officer Jessica Haley	Series regular (12 episodes)
1990	Matlock	Renee Williams	Episode: "The Biker"
1990	Jake and the Fatman	Josie	Episode: "It Never Entered My Mind" (backdoor pilot for Diagnosis Murder)
1991	Perry Mason: The Case of the Fatal Fashion	Julia Collier	Television film
1991	L.A. Law	Christina Shepherd	Episodes: "Pump It Up” and “Mutinies on the Banzai”
1991	Tales from the Crypt	Elaine Tillman	Episode: "Mournin' Mess"
1992	The Witches of Eastwick	Alexandra Spofford	Pilot
1993	Moon Over Miami	Gwen Cross	Series regular, 13 episodes
1996	Wings	Melissa Williams	Episode: "Love at First Flight"
1996–1999	Profiler	Doctor Samantha Waters	Series regular (64 episodes); Nominated – Saturn Award for Best Actress on Television (1998) and Best Actress – Television Series Drama (1998)
1999	The Pretender	Doctor Samantha Waters	Episode: "End Game"
1999	If You Believe	Susan Stone	Television film
2002	My Wonderful Life	Billie	Pilot
2005	Sleeper Cell	Lynn Ellen Emerson	2 episodes
2006	ER	Fran Bevens	Episode: "Body & Soul"
2006	The Shield	Tori Burke	Episode: "Postpartum"
2007	American Dad!	Melinda (voice)	Episode: "Four Little Words"
2007	Tell Me You Love Me	Katie	Series regular (10 episodes)
2008	Boston Legal	Attorney Phoebe Prentice	2 episodes
2008	Law & Order	Gretchen Steel	Episode: "Driven"
2009	CSI: Crime Scene Investigation	Rita Nettles	Episode: "Hog Heaven"
2009	Southland	Dr. Merrill Matthews	2 episodes
2010	Law & Order: Special Victims Unit	Dr. Fran Stanton	Episode: "Conned"
2008–2010	Sons of Anarchy	Agent June Stahl	19 episodes
2011	The Protector	Gloria Sheppard	Series regular (13 episodes)
2014	Taxi Brooklyn	Frankie Sullivan	Series regular (12 episodes)
2015–2016	Longmire	Dr. Donna Monaghan	8 episodes
2016–2018	Colony	Helena Goldwin	16 episodes
2017–2018	Ghosted	Capt. Ava Lafrey	Series regular (16 episodes)
