= Justin Prentice =

American actor (born 1994)

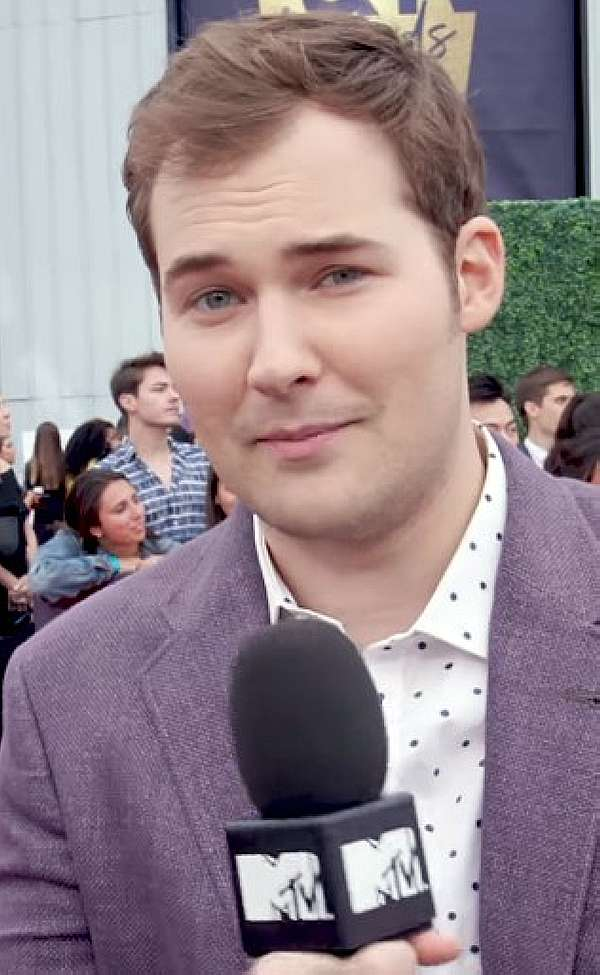
- Prentice at the 2018 MTV Movie & TV Awards
- Born: March 25, 1994 (age 32); Nashville, Tennessee, U.S.
- Occupation: Actor
- Years active: 2010–present

Justin Wright Prentice (born March 25, 1994) is an American actor. He is best known for playing Bryce Walker, the main antagonist in the Netflix series 13 Reasons Why.

Prentice is also known for his role as Cash Gallagher in the ABC sitcom Malibu Country. In 2017, Prentice appeared in the AMC series Preacher.

== Filmography ==
=== Film ===
Year	Title	Role	Notes
2011	Terri	Dirty Jack	
2012	Me Again	Colin	
2015	Sex, Death and Bowling	Teenage Rick	
2015	Some Kind of Hate	Jim Greene	
2017	Brownstone	Luke	
2017	Crossing Fences	—N/a	Producer
2021	Far More	Teenage Rick	

=== Television ===
Year	Title	Role	Notes
2010	Criminal Minds	Ryan Krouse	Episode: "Risky Business"
2010	Melissa & Joey	Brett	Episode: "In Lennox We Trust"
2010	The Middle	Teenage Boy	Episode: "Halloween"
2011	Victorious	Ariel's Dad	Episode: "Wok Star"
2011	iCarly	Brad	2 episodes
2011	Suburgatory	Joey	Episode: "The Barbecue"
2012	Marvin Marvin	Cliff Drill	Episode: "Pilot"
2012	Winx Club	Deforestator	8 episodes
2012–2013	Malibu Country	Cash Gallagher	Main cast
2013	The Legend of Korra	Jaya (voice)	2 episodes
2014	NCIS	Navy Ensign Michael Fox	2 episodes
2015	Glee	Darrell	2 episodes
2015	NCIS: New Orleans	Young Cade	Episode: "You'll Do"
2015	Castle	Scott Powell	Episode: "PhDead"
2015	The Mindy Project	Eric	Episode: "Road Trip"
2015	CSI: Cyber	Carter Harris	Episode: "iWitness"
2015–2016	iZombie	Brody Johnson	2 episodes
2016	Awkward	Patrick	5 episodes
2016	Those Who Can't	Bryce	4 episodes
2017	Preacher	Tyler	3 episodes
2017–2020	13 Reasons Why	Bryce Walker	Main role, 44 episodes
2022	True Story with Ed and Randall	John	1 Episode
2026	Chicago Med	Ian	Guest role, 2 episode
