= Central Brain Tumor Registry of the United States =

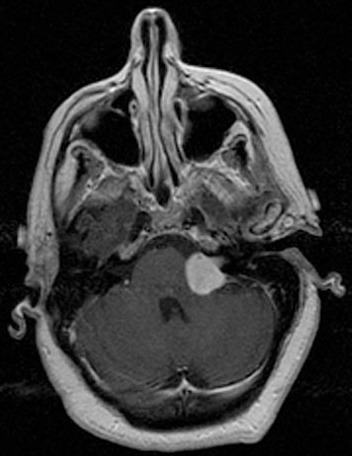
A vestibular schwannoma (VS) is only one type of tumor

The Central Brain Tumor Registry of the United States (CBTRUS) is the primary national database of malignant and benign tumors of the brain, "other central nervous system (CNS), tumors of the pituitary and pineal glands, olfactory tumors of the nasal cavity, and brain lymphoma and leukemia." A non-profit, it was established in 1992.
