= Sex, Death and Bowling =

2015 film by Ally Walker

- Theatrical release poster
- Directed by: Ally Walker
- Written by: Ally Walker
- Produced by: Ally Walker; Larry Rattner; Sig De Miguel; Jodi Schoenbrun Carter
- Starring: Adrian Grenier; Selma Blair; Bailey Chase; Melora Walters; Drea de Matteo; Mary Lynn Rajskub; Daniel Hugh Kelly; Joshua Rush
- Cinematography: Frederic Fasano
- Edited by: Grant Myers; Ruben Sebban; Colleen Halsey
- Music by: Vidjay Beerepoot; Mark Fontana
- Distributed by: Monterey Media
- Release date: October 2, 2015 (San Diego)
- Country: United States
- Language: English
- Box office: $6,000

Sex, Death and Bowling is a 2015 American independent comedy-drama film starring Adrian Grenier, Selma Blair, Bailey Chase, Drea de Matteo and Joshua Rush. It marked the directing and writing debut of actress Ally Walker.

The film was re-edited and released for internet distribution under the title "Far More" on September 21, 2021.

== Plot ==
Sean McAllister is a successful fashion designer who returns home to a small, rural town in southern California when he learns his brother, Rick, has cancer. Sean has been gone for a while since getting into an argument with his father. Rick lives at home with his wife, Glenn, and his live-in nurse Ana. Sean and Rick's father Dick owns a local sports equipment shop and is an avid bowler. Rick's son, Eli, idolizes his father and his grandfather and wishes to become as good a bowler as the two of them. Sean arrives and immediately begins opening up old wounds with his father. Sean is gay, and an incident when he was younger involving another boy from the high school football team which a teacher saw brought shame to Dick, resulting in the two becoming distant even after Sean's rise to fame. Sean tries to reconcile with both his father and his brother, but it proves difficult.

Dick is trying to win a bowling tournament, the Fiesta Bowl, but trouble arises when one of his bowlers becomes injured. Trying to reconnect with his father and family, Sean agrees to join the team. They eventually win the tournament and bring home the trophy to Rick.

== Cast ==
- Adrian Grenier as Sean McAllister
- Selma Blair as Glenn McAllister
- Bailey Chase as Rick McAllister
  - Justin Prentice as Teenage Rick
- Melora Walters as Evie
- Drea de Matteo as Ana
- Mary Lynn Rajskub as Kim Wells
- Daniel Hugh Kelly as Dick McAllister
- Joshua Rush as Eli McAllister
- Drew Powell as Tim Hollister
- Googy Gress as Dan Cornfielder
- Richard Riehle as Father Joe
- Erica Gimpel as Shanti
