= Malibu Country =

- Genre: Sitcom
- Created by: David A. Stewart
- Developed by: Kevin Abbott
- Starring: Reba McEntire; Sara Rue; Justin Prentice; Juliette Angelo; Jai Rodriguez; Lily Tomlin
- Opening theme: "Goodbye Looks Good On Me" by Reba McEntire
- Composer: Doug Sisemore
- Country of origin: United States
- Original language: English
- No. of seasons: 1
- No. of episodes: 18

Production
- Executive producers: Reba McEntire; John Pasquin; Pam Williams; Narvel Blackstock; Mindy Schultheis; Michael Hanel; Kevin Abbott (pilot); David A. Stewart
- Camera setup: Multi-camera
- Running time: 22 minutes
- Production companies: NestEgg Productions (pilot); Blah, Blah, Blah Productions (episodes 2–18); Acme Productions; ABC Studios

Original release
- Network: ABC
- Release: November 2, 2012 – March 22, 2013

Malibu Country is an American sitcom that ran on ABC from November 2, 2012, to March 22, 2013. The series was created by David A. Stewart and marks Reba McEntire's return to series television, following up her previous sitcom Reba (2001–2007).

McEntire stars as Reba MacKenzie, who recently discovered her country music star-husband has been cheating on her, and the two divorce. As part of the divorce settlement, she moves to a house her ex-husband owns in Malibu, California and attempts to restart her music career while also starting a new chapter in her family's lives. Malibu Country's producer Kevin Abbott is a former Reba producer, and McEntire serves as an executive producer for the series.

On April 23, 2013, it was announced that Nastaran Dibai, who took over as writer and producer after Abbott left in October 2012, had departed as well from the show.

On May 10, 2013, ABC cancelled the series after one season.

== Overview ==
After finding that her husband has been cheating on her, Reba MacKenzie and her family move from Nashville, Tennessee, to Malibu, California, in an attempt to restart her music career and start a new chapter in their lives.

== Cast and characters ==
=== Main cast ===
- Reba as Reba Gallagher (née MacKenzie), a mother of two kids, and a former country music sensation trying to get her foot back in the door
- Lily Tomlin as Lillie Mae MacKenzie, Reba's no-nonsense mother
- Sara Rue as Kim Sallinger, Reba's hug-too-freely, share-too-much, upbeat neighbor
- Justin Prentice as Cash Gallagher, Reba's teenage son
- Juliette Angelo as June Gallagher, Reba's teenage daughter
- Jai Rodriguez as Geoffrey, a record label assistant Reba turns to for help getting her career back on track

=== Recurring cast ===
- Jeffrey Nordling as Bobby Gallagher, a country music star and Reba's ex-husband
- Hudson Thames as Sage, Kim's teenage step-son and June's boyfriend
- Larry Wilmore as Mr. Clark, Cash and June's school principal
- James Patrick Stuart as Mr. Bata, the head of the record company where Geoffrey works

=== Guest stars ===
- Travie McCoy as himself ("Shell Games")
- Steven Weber as Pete Mason ("Bro Code")
- Heather Dubrow as Brooke ("Cold Shower")
- Laura Bell Bundy as Shauna ("Adventures in Babysitting")
- Tisha Campbell-Martin as Rikki ("Bowling for Mama")
- Owen Teague as Jack ("Oh Comedy")
- Blake Shelton as Blake MacKenzie ("Oh Brother")
- Enrico Colantoni as Leslie, Kim's husband ("Marriage, Malibu Style")
- Dove Cameron as Sienna ("Push Comes to Shove")
- Stacy Keach as Brad, a date of Reba and Lillie Mae ("All You Single Ladies")

== Episodes ==
No.	Title	Directed by	Written by	Original release date	Prod. code	U.S. viewers (millions)
1	"Pilot"	John Pasquin	Story by : David A. Stewart & David Harris; Teleplay by : Kevin Abbott	November 2, 2012	101	9.13
After finding out that her husband, country music star Bobby Gallagher, had an affair with a co-worker, Reba Mackenzie moves herself, her family, and her mother to Malibu, to live in a house that she never knew her husband had. She hopes to restart a music career that she abandoned years ago so she could take care of her family, which allowed her husband's music career to take off. After moving in, she immediately meets her neighbor Kim, who comes off as a flighty woman who can't keep anything to herself. After finally scheduling a meeting with a record producer, Reba goes to the office and finds that she isn't what they are looking for, because she isn't 'young and sexy' according to the record producer's assistant, Geoffrey. Reba soon realizes that Malibu is going to be a much different place, and a big adjustment for her Nashville-native family. As her formerly shy and reserved daughter, June, makes a new friend (Kim's stepson, Sage), her formerly popular son, Cash, is adjusting to his girlfriend breaking up with him rather than trying to maintain a long-distance relationship.
2	"Baby Steps"	Andy Cadiff	Pat Bullard	November 9, 2012	102	7.34
Kim finds an article in a magazine about Bobby, Reba's ex, saying that he was dating a woman. Kim shows it to Lillie insisting that they shouldn't show Reba, only for Reba to come around and have Lillie show her. June convinces Reba that her relationship with Sage is platonic because Sage is gay, but when Cash brings over Sage's computer to him, he finds Sage kissing another girl, Bethany (Piper Curda). Cash threatens to tell June, implying that he can't be gay. When Cash tells June about what he saw earlier, she tells him that she's fine with it. Kim sets Reba up with a man she knows named Tom, saying that Reba needs to get out of the house. After a talk with Lillie Mae, Reba agrees to go on the date. When Geoffrey stops by to get papers signed, Reba enlists his help to pick out an outfit. Reba gets delayed while talking to June about her feelings for Sage. When she shows up late for her date, Lillie and Kim tell her that Tom believed that she stood him up and left. When Reba gets home she has to explain to Cash and June about her dating.
3	"Shell Games"	Andrew D. Weyman	Daniel Sweren-Becker	November 16, 2012	103	6.67
Reba finds herself waiting for a call from Geoffrey regarding a song she submitted to Mr. Bata through Geoffrey. Prompted by Kim, she goes down and insists that Geoffrey play her song for Mr. Bata. It turns out Mr. Bata heard the song and loved it, but doesn't want Reba to sing it, prompting him to instead ask rapper Travie McCoy to sing her song. Lillie Mae finds herself the target of an admirer when Kim finds a note in a conch shell. Assuming it was for Reba she brings it to Reba, only to find out that Lillie Mae was the one singing, not Reba. Reba agrees to do a duet with Travie on the song she wrote, only to have it turn out horribly when he begins adding lyrics that weren't in the song and shooting a sleazy video for it. Reba then proceeds to try and convince Geoffrey to get Travie off the track. Cash starts feeling lonely when the other kids at school begin making fun of him for his Southern accent, and decides to change it. June, who is surprisingly adjusting well, tells Cash that he'll most likely be popular soon but just has to give it time.
4	"Cash's Car"	David Trainer	Matt Berry	November 23, 2012	104	6.53
It's Cash's birthday and Reba's former husband Bobby is attending his birthday. The gift Bobby hands over to Cash is a luxurious sports car, Reba is quite angered by this because Bobby failed to communicate to her about buying such an expensive item for Cash and she didn't want Cash to be spoiled with such a luxurious item. Therefore, Reba has a talk with Bobby and questions Bobby about what he did. Bobby explains that he bought the car because Cash was complaining to him on the phone about how miserable his life is in Malibu. Reba is shocked at what she hears and feels terrible that she never noticed how Cash felt. During their conversation, June is doing laundry in the house, but was supposed to be hanging out with Cash in the new car. Reba asks June why she isn't with Cash and she explains that she was kicked out the car to make space for his friends. Reba figures out that Cash was lying to his father to get a car and finds a way to accuse Cash for his actions. Meanwhile, Kim reveals that she is pregnant and is very worried because she has no idea of how to care of a baby. Lillie Mae gives her some advice and reassures her that she will be helping her out with her baby.
5	"Not with My Daughter"	Andrew D. Weyman	Chris Case & Nastaran Dibai	November 30, 2012	105	6.31
Cash has been bullied by some local surfers and feels very emasculated. For that reason, Lillie Mae helps Cash and gets him to be a real man by blindfolding him and leaving him on the beach with a campfire overnight. Meanwhile, Reba finds out that her daughter June has been spending a lot of time with Kim, which includes them text messaging each other constantly. Reba is threatened by this because she thinks Kim is replacing her, and Reba asks June to go shopping with her. June agrees, but finds out that shopping with her mother is no fun at all, and June sends a text message to Kim to "rescue" her. Reba sees the text, and is quite sad and shocked. When Reba gets home with June, they have a discussion and, with the help of the new take-charge Cash, express each other's concerns. June tells Reba that she shouldn't be threatened by Kim because Reba will always be her mother and nobody will ever replace her. Reba is happy, and says that she is fine with June spending time with Kim. But in the end, June reveals that Kim has become rather annoying, and asks Reba to distract Kim so that she doesn't have to be with her.
6	"Bro Code"	Andrew D. Weyman	Chris Case & Nastaran Dibai	December 7, 2012	106	6.01
Lillie Mae finds Reba working on some separation papers and admits that she is glad that Reba is divorced from Bobby, never to be in a relationship with him again. Reba then finds Pete Mason (Steven Weber), a friend of Bobby's, in the house. Pete says Bobby used to let him stay there whenever he was in town, and he had no idea that Reba was now living in the house. He insists on getting a room at a hotel instead, but Reba politely asks him to stay. Cash then gets caught taking a late-night stroll on the beach, which he claims was to clear his mind. Reba suspects he is lying and grounds him. The next day, Reba introduces Lillie Mae and Kim to Pete. Alone with Reba, Kim and Lillie Mae ask her to find out what Bobby and Pete did in the house when Reba wasn't there. Pete refuses to tell her, not wanting to violate the "bro code" – a code made among male friends who have secrets. Lillie Mae and Kim resolve to get Pete drunk to learn information. A drunken Pete then tells Reba that Bobby would often help him get to AA meetings to save his music career. Reba feels terrible, and deduces that Bobby was sometimes a good guy. She then finds out that June got her belly pierced and Cash had helped her out.
7	"Merry Malibu Christmas"	Andrew D. Weyman	Susan Hurwitz Arneson	December 14, 2012	107	6.42
Lillie Mae brings a peculiar Christmas tree to their home and Reba is not thrilled about it, but Lillie Mae suggests that change is good for all of them. Meanwhile, Reba auditions for a Christmas song solo at the Malibu Church, and finds out that Kim is auditioning as well. When the audition is over, it is announced that Kim has won and therefore will be singing in church for Christmas. Reba and Lillie Mae are quite shocked about this, as Kim's singing was atrocious. Geoffrey tells both Reba and Lillie Mae the only reason Kim won was because her husband donated quite a lot of money to the church, with a condition that Kim wins the competition. Reba tries to keep this information secret, but when Kim gets a bit cocky about winning, Reba lets the truth slip out. Also, Reba discovers that June no longer believes in God, because she prayed that Reba and Bobby would stay together and that prayer wasn't answered. Reba tells her that she's okay with that and that June can believe in whatever she wants, but Reba also shares a lesson about what faith means. On Christmas Day, it is time for Kim to sing in front the congregation. When she does not come out, Reba finds Kim and asks her what's wrong. Kim exclaims she now knows she can't sing, she just wanted to be in the spotlight for once. Reba comes up with the idea to sing off-stage while Kim lip synchs on-stage. June surprises Reba by showing up at the service.
8	"Push Comes to Shove"	Andrew D. Weyman	Bill Martin & Mike Schiff	January 4, 2013	108	5.96
Cash is being bullied by Andrew Collins, a popular guy at school. Reba insists he stand up for himself. Upon learning that June wants to play the clarinet, but can't because the school's music program is to be dropped due to cutbacks, Reba joins the school's music fundraising committee and goes the meeting with Kim. At the meeting, June tells Reba that she thought Reba was there for Cash. Reba and Kim then find Cash nearby and learn from the principal that Cash shoved Andrew Collins. The principal says this is "pure violence" and Cash now has one strike in his school record. Reba tries to defend Cash, who was just defending himself by pushing Andrew. The principal still deems it as violence and says Cash should've reported that he was bullied. The exchange gets heated and Cash must pull Reba away. An unexpected fallout from the incident is that a girl now likes Cash, and views him as a tough guy. Cash plays it up to its fullest, until a much larger classmate makes him back down. At home, Kim tells Reba that she is not wanted at the committee anymore, due to the altercation with the principal. Reba then makes some cookies for the committee to get back in their good graces, deciding it would be a great fundraising idea. Lillie Mae learns Reba used her "special butter" (containing marijuana), as Geoffrey is dizzy and acting odd after eating a cookie. She warns Reba, who takes everybody's cookies away from them. This makes Reba look bad to everyone, but she tricks them into feeling sorry for her.
9	"Cold Shower"	Andrew D. Weyman	Dave Bickel	January 11, 2013	109	6.10
Kim wants Reba to throw her a lavish baby shower, but Reba's common-sense plans are upstaged by the over-the-top ideas put forth by Kim's longtime friend, Brooke (Heather Dubrow). Reba ends up making derogatory comments about Kim that are caught on Sage's video camera. June is forced to face the fact that she is in love with Sage. Lillie Mae pretends to fall ill, so that Cash can "rescue" her and look like a hero to the many girls who are in town for a Junior Miss America pageant.
10	"Easy Money"	Andrew D. Weyman	Cheryl Holliday	January 18, 2013	110	5.88
June announces she wants to pursue a singing career, to which Reba says it takes a lot of time and hard work. After June uploads a video on YouTube of her singing while the neighbor's cat "dances," she stuns Reba by getting a meeting with record producer Mr. Bata (whom Reba can't even get in to see). But ultimately, June does not get a recording contract after another "cat video" becomes more popular than hers. Meanwhile, Lillie Mae gets Kim into betting on horse racing, and they discover that Cash has a secret gift that helps him determine which horse will win. As their betting success continues, Kim develops a gambling addiction, consulting Cash at all hours of the night.
11	"Based on a True Story"	Mark Cendrowski	D. J. Ryan & Kevin Pedersen	February 1, 2013	111	5.99
Upon learning that Cash is having difficulty writing a one-act play for an English project, Reba tells him to look to his own life and write what he knows. But Reba's advice comes back to haunt her when Cash writes a play that contains a lot of similarities to Reba and Bobby's marital woes. Meanwhile, Lillie Mae decides to embrace her artistic self when Geoffrey gets her into his improv class.
12	"Adventures in Babysitting"	Andrew D. Weyman	David Bickel	February 8, 2013	112	6.13
In order to keep her from losing her deal with the record label, Reba agrees to collaborate with superstar bad girl singer Shauna (Laura Bell Bundy), who demands to move into Reba's home for a while in order to get to know her better. But her bad habits start to rub off on the kids when she asks Cash to buy her some alcohol and encourages June to stop being so dependable. Meanwhile, Lillie Mae begins to think that Reba doesn't miss her when she moves next door for a few days after agreeing to housesit for Kim.
13	"Babies Having Babies"	Andrew D. Weyman	Bill Martin & Mike Schiff	February 15, 2013	113	5.78
Reba and Lillie Mae put their plans for a weekend getaway on hold when Sage makes a confession that stirs things up for the entire family, while also shaking Kim's confidence in her ability to be a good mom.
14	"Bowling for Mama"	Phill Lewis	Matt Berry	February 22, 2013	114	5.11
Reba, June and Cash vie to give Lillie Mae the very best birthday gift. June has come up with a great gift idea, leaving a stumped Cash to try and latch onto the same theme. Lillie's birthday wish is for Reba to bowl for her team as they prepare for a championship match, which has Reba questioning her mother's overly-competitive nature. Reba learns that the team plans to replace Lillie Mae for this reason, and when news gets back to Lillie Mae, she laces up her shoes for the opposing team.
15	"Oh Brother"	Robbie Countryman	Pat Bullard	March 1, 2013	115	6.15
Reba's ne'er-do-well brother, Blake (Blake Shelton), visits and comes up with a scheme to market Lillie Mae's barbecue sauce. He also dispenses advice to Cash after June accidentally but publicly mentions in school that Cash is a virgin. When a cute girl in school approaches Cash, he senses that Blake's advice is working, but Cash instead gets invited to join an abstinence club.
16	"Marriage, Malibu Style"	Andrew D. Weyman	Kevin Abbott	March 8, 2013	116	5.92
Reba gives Geoffrey one of her songs. He likes it, but says it needs more of her vulnerability in it. Kim's husband, Leslie, drops by for Reba's fundraising donation. When he offers to fix a misunderstanding of the donation amount, Reba offers a hug, but Leslie wants a kiss instead. Kim confides that she and Leslie have agreed to an open relationship, though Kim reluctantly admits that she only did so to ensure that Leslie doesn't leave her. Kim's vulnerability inspires Reba to draw on her own failed marriage and write a hit song. Meanwhile, Lillie Mae gets a complete sunburn at a nude beach. The episode closes with Reba's song being played on the radio as Lillie Mae and Kim sit on the deck and listen.
17	"New Plans"	Robbie Countryman	Nastaran Dibai	March 15, 2013	117	5.60
Reba finally gets a face-to-face meeting with the elusive Mr. Bata (James Patrick Stuart), but his idea to have her write commercial jingles has her flustered and frustrated. About to give up on writing a song for an energy drink, Reba hears Lillie Mae hum a quick tune and decides to pitch that to Mr. Bata, as it's better than anything she's developed. But when Lillie Mae realizes at the last possible moment that the tune is from an existing commercial, Reba has to improvise in front of Mr. Bata and the clients. Meanwhile, Sage has written a song for June, and Reba is floored at how talented he is when she hears him play it. Although Reba badly wants to pitch one of her regular songs to Mr. Bata, she instead gives him a copy of Sage's song, while reluctantly accepting a job to write a jingle for toilet paper.
18	"All You Single Ladies"	Phill Lewis	Chris Case	March 22, 2013	118	7.04
Kim, Lillie Mae and Geoffrey make Reba a profile on an online dating site, and Reba reluctantly agrees to a date with a man named Brad (Stacy Keach). But Brad turns out to be much older than his profile photo.

== Development and production ==
Malibu Country was originally a series in development for ABC. The pilot episode was scheduled to shoot on April 17, 2012, at ABC Studios. McEntire was selected to play Reba McKenzie, a divorced mother of two who moves to Malibu, California, to restart her music career.

It was announced on February 23, 2012, that Lily Tomlin would join the series, playing the role of McEntire's character's mother, Lillie Mae. On March 1, 2012, Sara Rue was added to the cast. She portrays Kim, a neighbor to Reba and Lillie, who is a very upbeat share-too-much, hug-too-freely trophy wife and neighbor with a teenage stepson who may or may not be gay. On March 8, 2012, Justin Prentice and Juliette Angelo were cast as Reba's teenage son and daughter, Cash and June respectively. On March 28, 2012, Jai Rodriguez was cast as Geoffrey, a record label assistant in town whom Reba contacts to restart her music career.

On May 11, 2012, ABC placed a series order for the comedy. The series premiered on Friday, November 2, 2012 at 8:30 p.m., following the season premiere of Last Man Standing. On November 12, 2012, ABC picked up an additional three scripts for Malibu Country. It was announced on November 28, 2012, that ABC increased the episode order for season one from thirteen to eighteen episodes.

== Reception ==
=== Critical reception ===
The series has received mixed to negative reviews from critics. The series currently has a score of 41 out of 100 on Metacritic, citing mixed or average reviews.

=== Ratings ===
The series premiere received 9.13 million viewers, and a 2.3 in the coveted 18–49 rating share, up 1 million viewers from its lead in, the season premiere of Last Man Standing. The premiere scored ABC's highest numbers in the half hour in almost five years. As of November 27, 2012, the first season episode order has been expanded from 13 to 18, with ABC also announcing that Malibu Country is the highest-rated freshman comedy on television in the 2012 fall season with an average of 8.7 million viewers per episode.
