= When the Bough Breaks (1994 film) =

- Promotional poster
- Directed by: Michael Cohn
- Written by: Michael Cohn
- Produced by: Denise Ballew; Barry L. Collier; Barbara Javitz
- Starring: Ally Walker; Martin Sheen; Ron Perlman; Tara Subkoff
- Cinematography: Michael Bonvillain
- Edited by: Stephen Butler
- Music by: Ed Tomney
- Distributed by: Prism Entertainment
- Release date: June 1, 1994
- Running time: 105 minutes
- Country: United States
- Language: English

When the Bough Breaks (released in the Philippines as Slaughter of the Lambs) is a 1994 American thriller film directed by Michael Cohn and starring Ally Walker, Martin Sheen, Ron Perlman and Tara Subkoff. The screenplay concerns a serial killer.

== Plot ==
Following a gruesome discovery of a bag of severed hands in the sewer system, State Profiler Audrey Macleah is called in to help the Houston police department investigate. After examination, the hands appear to be the hands of young girls from various ages, each with a number tattooed on her palm. Captain Swaggert sends Macleah to a nearby psychiatric hospital to talk to a doctor who called in a tip about one of his patients after hearing about the discovery.

His patient is Jordan Thomas, who has been in foster homes and institutionalized since he was four years old. Every year on his birthday he has seizures, his wrists start to bleed, and he carves hands into the walls - each with numbers stenciled on the palms. Despite Jordan's initial reluctance to communicate with her, Macleah earns his trust and discovers there is a psychic connection between Jordan and the killer.

After combing through Jordan's medical files and the databases, Macleah learns that the hands belong to young girls who have all gone missing over the years on Jordan's birthday, July 16, from nearby parks around the Houston area. On a video from a missing girl's file, Macleah hears the song of the ice cream truck and figures out it's the song Jordan hums each time she goes to visit him. The Houston police department track down a lead with a pedophilic ice cream man but he turns out to be a dead end.

On Jordan's birthday, during a hypnosis game, Macleah gleans information from Jordan's alter-ego named Jennifer Lynn. Jennifer tells Macleah that the hands are given from Daddy so she can play. At the same time, a young girl is seen running through the woods with her dog. She stumbles upon an unaccompanied ice cream truck and goes inside for a snack. She is assaulted from behind and the truck drives away with her inside.

With help from a colleague, Macleah finds the identity of a Jennifer Lynn Eben, who has been deceased for some time. She visits the old shuttered hospital and finds birth records for Jordan Brian Eben, given up for adoption at birth after the hemorrhaging death of his mother Jennifer Lynn. After flipping a page, Macleah sees the birth record for a female twin, Jennifer Lynn Eben, born with extremely malformed hands. The attending physician during their birth was their own father, Douglas Eben.

Macleah visits the Eben estate and meets a housekeeper who tells her Eben is on vacation but invites her in. Inside, Macleah sees photos of Jennifer, the mother, but none of the daughter Jenny. She learns that the mother, was a piano prodigy and the daughter is away at private school in Europe. One photo in particular is striking, depicting a dark-haired young woman standing in front of a house by a water tower. As she is driving back to the precinct, Macleah sees the water tower and crosses traffic to find the house from the picture. After knocking to no answer, Macleah goes around back through the open gate and peers into the garage to see an old ice cream truck. She breaks a window to enter the home and after patrolling the house, locates the basement door. Once downstairs she breaks into a padlocked room and finds a homemade medical operating room with a furnace. She spots a shower in the corner and reveals the missing girl from the ice cream truck, terrified and alive.

After freeing her, they hear a noise from the adjacent room where Macleah discovers Jenny hiding behind a wardrobe. Macleah manages to pry open a basement window for their escape, but their plans are interrupted by the arrival of Doug Eben, who has arrived to deliver Jenny her birthday present. Macleah hides in the medical room, observing their interaction. Doug lights candles for Jenny and asks her to play the piano. She hesitantly plays a few keys as Eben stands behind her. He then picks her up, tucks her in, and gives her a long kiss. However, before he can leave the room, he hears a whimper from the medical room. Upon investigating, he confronts Macleah, resulting in a struggle where Macleah sets him on fire as the two young girls escape. Macleah retrieves her gun and shoots Eben until he collapses.

At the end, Captain Swaggert is seen driving Jenny with pinned hands to meet Jordan, who Macleah has discharged from the psychiatric hospital. The twins embrace with tears in their eyes.

== Cast ==
- Ally Walker as Audrey Macleah
- Martin Sheen as Captain Swaggert
- Ron Perlman as Dr. Douglas Eben
- Tara Subkoff as Jordan Thomas / Jennifer Lynn Eben
- Robert Knepper as Lt. Jimmy Creedmore
- Scott Lawrence as Sergeant Footman
- John P. Connolly as Sergeant Belvin

== Release ==
When the Bough Breaks was released in the United States on June 1, 1994. In the Philippines, the film was released as Slaughter of the Lambs on December 14, 1995.

== Accolades ==
The film won the Grand Prix Vidéo at the 1995 Cognac Festival du Film Policier.
