= True Blue (TV series) =

American television series

- Created by: David J. Kinghorn
- Starring: John Bolger
- Composer: Domenic Troiano
- Country of origin: United States
- Original language: English
- No. of seasons: 1
- No. of episodes: 12 (1 unaired)

Production
- Running time: 60 minutes
- Production companies: Grosso-Jacobson Productions; NBC Productions

Original release
- Network: NBC
- Release: December 3, 1989 – February 16, 1990

True Blue is an American crime drama series set in New York City, which aired on Friday evenings on NBC from December 3, 1989, until February 16, 1990. The hour-long drama follows the exploits of a squad of uniformed officers assigned to the specialized trucks of the New York City Police Department Emergency Service Unit.

== Plot ==
The premise of the show was ESU, the emergency service unit of the NYPD and its handling of rescues, emergencies and SWAT team–required incidents in the city.

== Cast ==
Main characters

- John Bolger as Officer Bobby Traverso
- Leo Burmester as Officer Red Tollin
- Dick Latessa as Det. Mike Duffy
- Nestor Serrano as Officer Geno Toffenelli
- Grant Show as Cadet Casey Pierce
- Beau Starr as Lt. Bill Triplett
- Tim Van Patten as Sgt. Andy Wojeski
- Ally Walker as Officer Jessy Haley
- Darnell Williams as Officer David Odom
- Elya Baskin as Yuri
- Eddie Velez as Officer Frankie Avila

Recurring guest characters

- Victor Arnold as Dep. Chief Servino
- Joe Lisi as 8th Precinct Capt. Motta
- Annie Golden as Connie Tollin

== Episodes ==
No.	Title	Directed by	Written by	Original release date
1	"Pilot"	William A. Graham	David J. Kinghorn	December 3, 1989
2	"Pilot"	William A. Graham	David J. Kinghorn	December 3, 1989
The team races to help a busload of children taken hostage by terrorists at the United Nations.
3	"Life with the Lady"	Don Medford	David J. Kinghorn	December 8, 1989
Pierce tries to talk a jumper off the Statue of Liberty; a man with a machete hijacks a city bus.
4	"Oldies, But Goodies"	Gilbert M. Shilton	David J. Kinghorn	December 15, 1989
Geno poses as Elvis to placate an armed madman; an apparent jumper on a bridge tower turns out to be an amorous couple who like heights.
5	"Someone to Listen"	Richard Lang	Michael Fisher	December 22, 1989
Bobby tries to prevent a suicide; a disgruntled insurance customer takes hostages; Jessy delivers a baby in an elevator.
6	"Blue Monday"	George Mendeluk	Michael Zettler & Shelly Altman	January 5, 1990
Tollin tracks an escaped lion through the Empire State Building; an overzealous preacher impedes the rescue of a disturbed man.
7	"Hickory, Dickory, Dock"	Mike Vejar	James Schmerer	January 12, 1990
A lovesick college student climbs a drainpipe five stories; Tollin and Haley pose as nurses to thwart the bombing of a tour boat.
8	"The Beast"	Tony Mordente	Jonathan Day	January 19, 1990
An armed, impaired man takes refuge in the lion's cage at the zoo; the team tracks a deranged sniper through Intrepid Museum.
9	"Tunnel Vision"	Joseph L. Scanlan	Michael Eric Stein	January 26, 1990
Ski Boss tries to help a youngster living in an abandoned subway; Odom and Duffy try to rescue a thief who steals copper from roofs.
10	"Caves"	George Mendeluk	Robert Brennan	February 2, 1990
Collapsing earth traps two children in a cave with a drug dealer.
11	"Fire Down Below"	Mike Vejar	Stephen Lord	February 9, 1990
The unit rescues people trapped in toxic debris from a steampipe explosion; Casey vies for the NYPD boxing championship.
12	"Chinatown"	Mario Azzopardi	Peter McCabe	February 16, 1990
13	"Signal 66"	Tony Mordente	Peter McCabe	Unaired
