= Moon over Miami (TV series) =

American crime drama series

- Film poster
- Genre: Drama
- Created by: Harley Peyton
- Starring: Billy Campbell; Ally Walker; Agustin Rodriguez; Marlo Marron
- Composer: Delfeayo Marsalis
- Country of origin: United States
- Original language: English
- No. of seasons: 1
- No. of episodes: 13 (3 unaired)

Production
- Running time: 60 mins. (approx)
- Production companies: Harley Peyton TV; Columbia Pictures Television; ABC Productions

Original release
- Network: ABC
- Release: September 15 – December 1, 1993

Moon Over Miami is an American crime drama television series that aired on ABC from September 15 until December 1, 1993.

== Premise ==
Gwen Cross (Ally Walker) runs away from her own wedding, and private detective Walter Tatum (Bill Campbell) is hired to find her. Wanting her life to take a new direction, Gwen suggests that she work as a secretary for Walter's firm. Walter's father and grandfather were jazz musicians, and jazz music is a recurring theme of the series.

== Cast ==
- Billy Campbell – Walter Tatum
- Ally Walker – Gwen Cross
- Agustin Rodriguez – Tito
- Marlo Marron – Billie

== Production and broadcast ==
The series was canceled after ten of the thirteen episodes produced were aired. The show ranked 58th for the season. The remaining three episodes were aired across Europe, where the show generally proved more popular; the entire run aired on BBC One in a mid-afternoon slot in the United Kingdom in 1996, with a repeat run on BBC Two in the mornings the following year.

== Episodes ==
No.	Title	Directed by	Written by	Original release date
1	"Pilot"	Allan Arkush	Harley Peyton	September 15, 1993
2	"A Missing Person"	Allan Arkush	Harley Peyton	September 22, 1993
3	"My Old Flame"	Allan Arkush	Henry Bromell	September 29, 1993
4	"Farewell My Lovelies"	Lorraine Senna	Mark B. Perry	October 6, 1993
5	"Cinderello"	Betty Thomas	Ellen Herman	October 13, 1993
6	"Black River Bride"	Paris Barclay	Art Monterastelli	October 20, 1993
7	"If You Only Knew"	Allan Arkush	Mark B. Perry	October 27, 1993
8	"Careless Dentist Blues"	James Hayman	Story by : Art Monterastelli & Mark B. Perry & Harley Peyton; Teleplay by : Mark B. Perry & Harley Peyton	November 3, 1993
9	"Quiero Vivir"	Melanie Mayron	Ellen Herman	November 17, 1993
10	"In a Safe Place"	Allan Arkush	Henry Bromell	December 1, 1993
11	"Memory Man"	Burt Brinckerhoff	Larry Barber & Paul Barber	Unaired
12	"Small Packages"	Allan Arkush	Ellen Herman & Mark B. Perry	Unaired
13	"Watching the Detectives"	Harley Peyton	Harley Peyton	Unaired
