= Cerebellopontine cistern =

Details

Identifiers
- Latin: cisterna pontocerebellaris

The cerebellopontine cistern (also pontocerebellar cistern, cerebellopontine angle cistern, or angle cistern) is a paired subarachnoid cistern at the cerebellopontine angle, an angle created between the cerebellum and the pons on either side. Each cerebellopontine cistern is continuous anteromedially with the prepontine cistern.

The cistern contains the (ipsilateral) trigeminal nerve (CN V), facial nerve (CN VII), and vestibulocochlear nerve (VIII), the anterior inferior cerebellar artery, and superior petrosal vein.

== Etymology ==
The Terminologia Anatomica acknowledges the term "pontocerebellar cistern" (Latin: cisterna pontocerebellaris) and lists cerebellopontine cistern as the English synonym. For the term "cerebellopontine angle", it lists the Latin synonym "angulus pontocerebellaris".

The 8th edition of Clinically Oriented Anatomy considers the term "cerebellopontine cistern" as a synonym for "pontine cistern".
