= Eddie Velez =

American film, stage and television actor

- Born: Edwin Velez; June 4, 1958 (age 66); New York City, U.S.
- Occupation: Actor
- Years active: 1983–present

Edwin Velez (born June 4, 1958) is an American film, stage and television actor. He is best known for playing Frankie Santana in the final season of the American action and adventure television series The A-Team.

== Early life and education ==
Velez was born in Manhattan, New York, the son of Puerto Ricans. He graduated from the High School of Art and Design and attended the School of Visual Arts.

== Career ==
Velez started his career as a stand-up comic. After serving in the Air Force, he moved to Los Angeles, California, where he acted in plays and studied at the Estelle Harman's Actors Workshop. Velez appeared in various stage plays, including the first performance of the play Delirious, for which the cast won the Drama-Logue Award in the category Best Ensemble Performance.

Later in his career, Velez guest-starred in television programs including Hill Street Blues, The Trials of Rosie O'Neill (three episodes), Just Shoot Me!, Walker, Texas Ranger (two episodes), Murder, She Wrote, JAG, Tour of Duty, Cagney & Lacey (two episodes), The Commish, Profiler and Empty Nest. He appeared in films such as Split Decisions, Traffic, Repo Chick, Romero, Repo Man, The Hunted, Most Wanted, Rooftops and White Chicks.

Velez has starred and co-starred in television programs including Bay City Blues, playing Pepe Garcia, Berrenger's, playing Julio Morales, Charlie & Co., playing Miguel Santana, The A-Team, playing Frankie Santana, Trial and Error, playing John Hernandez, True Blue, playing Officer Frankie Avila and Live Shot, playing Ricardo Sandoval. He also played as Detective Alexander Garcia in the soap opera television series Port Charles and as Malko and Paul Mendez in Days of Our Lives.

== Filmography ==
=== Film ===
Year	Title	Role	Notes
1984	Repo Man	Napo	
1985	Doin' Time	Wetback	
1986	Extremities	Officer #1	
1987	The Women's Club	Carlos	
1988	Split Decisions	Julian 'Snake' Pedroza	
1989	Rooftops	Lobo	
1989	Romero	Lt. Columa	
1994	A Passion to Kill	Morales	
1997	Under Oath	Ray Ramírez	
1997	Most Wanted	Sgt. Peyton	
1998	Running Woman	Reuben Alvarez	
2000	Traffic	Agent Johnson	
2003	The Hunted	Richards	
2003	White Rush	Santos Chabron	
2004	White Chicks	Agent Vincent Gomez	
2005	Black Dawn	Brody	
2007	The Anna Nicole Smith Story	Playboy Photographer	
2007	Born	Father Anthony	
2008	Beautiful Loser	Diego (adult)	
2009	Repo Chick	Justice Espinoza	
2010	Bulletface	Eric Muller	
2010	The Forgotten Jewel	Taniguchi	

=== Television ===
Year	Title	Role	Notes
1983	For Love and Honor	Lucas	Television film
1983–1984	Bay City Blues	Pepe Garcia	8 episodes
1984	Summer Fantasy	Stratis	Television film
1985	Berrenger's	Julio Morales	11 episodes
1985	Double Dare	Cabbie	Episode: "Double Talk"
1985	Children of the Night	Tom	Television film
1985	Charlie & Co.	Miguel Santana	13 episodes
1985, 1986	Cagney & Lacey	Various roles	2 episodes
1986	C.A.T. Squad	Carlos	Television film
1986–1987	The A-Team	Frankie Santana	13 episodes
1987	Hill Street Blues	Ramon Mendez	Episode: "Sorry Wrong Number"
1987	Houston Knights	Lopez	Episode: "Houston's Hero"
1988	Supercarrier	Tony Mendez	Episode: "Ring of Fire"
1988	Trial and Error	John Hernandez	8 episodes
1989	Tour of Duty	Lt. Escobar	Episode: "Non-Essential Personnel"
1989	Monsters	Belphamelech	Episode: "All in a Day's Work"
1989	Shannon's Deal	Chuy Vargas	Television film
1989–1990	True Blue	Officer Frankie Avila	12 episodes
1990	Drug Wars: The Camarena Story	Ramon Varona	3 episodes
1991	Midnight Caller	Benny Fuentes	Episode: "Uninvited Guests"
1991	Empty Nest	Jose Martinez	Episode: "Food for Thought"
1991–1992	The Trials of Rosie O'Neill	Mack Delgado	3 episodes
1992	Danger Island	Vic	Television film
1992	Flying Blind	Paco	Episode: "The Week of Living Dangerously"
1992	From the Files of Joseph Wambaugh: A Jury of One	Tommy Alomar	Television film
1993	Body Bags	Baseball Player	Television film
1993–2004	Days of Our Lives	Paul Mendez / Malko	64 episodes
1994	Bitter Vengeance	Harry Carver	Television film
1994	Hardball	Diego Escobar	Episode: "Pilot"
1994	Murder, She Wrote	Pete Grimaldi	Episode: "Crimson Harvest"
1994	A Rainy Day	Armando	Television film
1995	The Commish	Tommy Le Grange	Episode: "Accused"
1995	High Tide	Roacha	Episode: "Down South"
1995	Live Shot	Ricardo Sandoval	13 episodes
1996	Walker, Texas Ranger	Fontemuro	2 episodes
1996	Tracey Takes On...	Angelo	Episode: "Health"
1996	L.A. Firefighters	Doctor	Episode: "The Fire Down Below"
1997	Gun	Detective Jiminez	Episode: "The Shot"
1997	Pacific Blue	Eddie Montez	Episode: "Sandman"
1997	Night Man	Bruce	Episode: "I Left My Heart"
1997	The Parent 'Hood	Det. Perez	Episode: "Don't Go There"
1998	Air America	Carlos Rey de Lupos	Episode: "Lost City"
1999	Seven Days	Rene	Episode: "Parkergeist"
1999	Soldier of Fortune, Inc.	Bartoloméw Sanchez	Episode: "The Vestige"
1999	Profiler	Luis Ortiz	Episode: "Las Brisas"
1999–2001	Port Charles	Det. Alexander Garcia	52 episodes
2000	A Father's Choice	Detective Cortez	Television film
2000	Just Shoot Me!	Miguel	Episode: "Fast Times at Finchmont High"
2004	Charmed	Inspector	Episode: "Styx Feet Under"
2005	Numbers	Raynor	Episode: "Man Hunt"
2007	By Appointment Only	Detective Sosa	Television film
2020	Interrogation	Counselor	Episode: "P.I. Charlie Shannon vs Eric Fisher 1996"
2020	Deputy	Ryan	Episode: "10-8 Selfless"
2022	Walker: Independence	Gil Santiago	Episode: "Friend of the Devil"
