= Abandoned (2010 film) =

- Official theatrical poster
- Directed by: Michael Feifer
- Written by: Peter Sullivan; Jeffrey Schenck (story)
- Produced by: Barry Barnholtz; Michael Feifer; Jeffrey Schenck; Diane Healey; Wood Dickinson
- Starring: Brittany Murphy; Dean Cain; Mimi Rogers
- Cinematography: Denis Maloney, A.S.C.
- Edited by: Bryan Roberts
- Music by: Andres Boulton
- Production companies: Renegade Pictures; ARO Entertainment; Barnholtz Entertainment; Feifer Worldwide
- Distributed by: Anchor Bay Entertainment
- Release date: August 24, 2010
- Country: United States
- Language: English

Abandoned is a 2010 American thriller film directed by Michael Feifer, starring Brittany Murphy, Dean Cain, Peter Bogdanovich, Mimi Rogers, and Jay Pickett. Abandoned is of one of two films released posthumously that had starred Brittany Murphy. Anchor Bay Entertainment is the distributor of the film.

== Plot ==
Mary Walsh is a banker who is taking her boyfriend of four months Kevin Peterson to the hospital for a routine outpatient surgery. A nurse tells her the surgery will be exactly one hour. When she returns to take Kevin home, she discovers that he has mysteriously disappeared. An administrator can find no record of Kevin, and when Mary contacts the police, Detective Franklin arrives and initiates a search for Kevin but finds no evidence of Kevin having been at the facility.

Increasingly frantic, Mary is taken to staff psychiatrist Dr. Bensley, who deems her to be mentally unstable. She is then tasked to find her missing boyfriend and prove her sanity.

Mary is then approached by an anonymous older man claiming to know of Kevin's whereabouts. A ransom of 10 million dollars is demanded and Mary has one hour to comply or her boyfriend's life will be at risk. She has to embezzle from her bank. When she transfers the funds as directed she comes face to face with Kevin and realizes the truth.

It is revealed that Kevin is part of the gang who allegedly kidnapped him and that Mary has been trapped in an elaborate scheme aimed at stealing the 10 million dollars from her bank and with Mary being the only witness to the activity of the gang, they decide that they need to kill her.

Mary escapes from the one gang member who attempts to kill her and in doing so she kills him. Holloway's cell phone rings and she hears the others waiting on confirmation that Mary has been killed. Kevin realizes that Mary is still alive and orders the others to return and kill her. The gang attempt to run Mary down in their car, but she manages to escape through a doorway prompting two of the gang to chase her while Amanda stays behind. Mary kills Cooper and continues to evade the other.

Detective Franklin, chasing a lead, uncovers the plot and races back to the hospital. When he arrives, he manages to step in to save Mary's life by shooting an armed Kevin. Kevin then falls to his death.

== Cast ==
- Brittany Murphy as Mary Walsh
- Dean Cain as Kevin Peterson
- Mimi Rogers as Victoria Markham
- Peter Bogdanovich as Dr. Bensley
- Jay Pickett as Detective Franklin
- Tim Thomerson as Cooper
- Scott Anthony Leet as John Holloway
- America Young as Amanda
- Tara Subkoff as Nurse Anna
- Wood Dickinson as Business Man at Bank
- Hamit Daylak Cashier

== Production ==
Abandoned was shot in June 2009 and was Murphy's last filmed project before her death on December 20, 2009. It is one of four films released after her death, one of them is Something Wicked and was dedicated to her.

== Release ==
Anchor Bay Entertainment acquired distribution rights in North America and released the film direct-to-video on August 24, 2010.
