= Howard P. House =

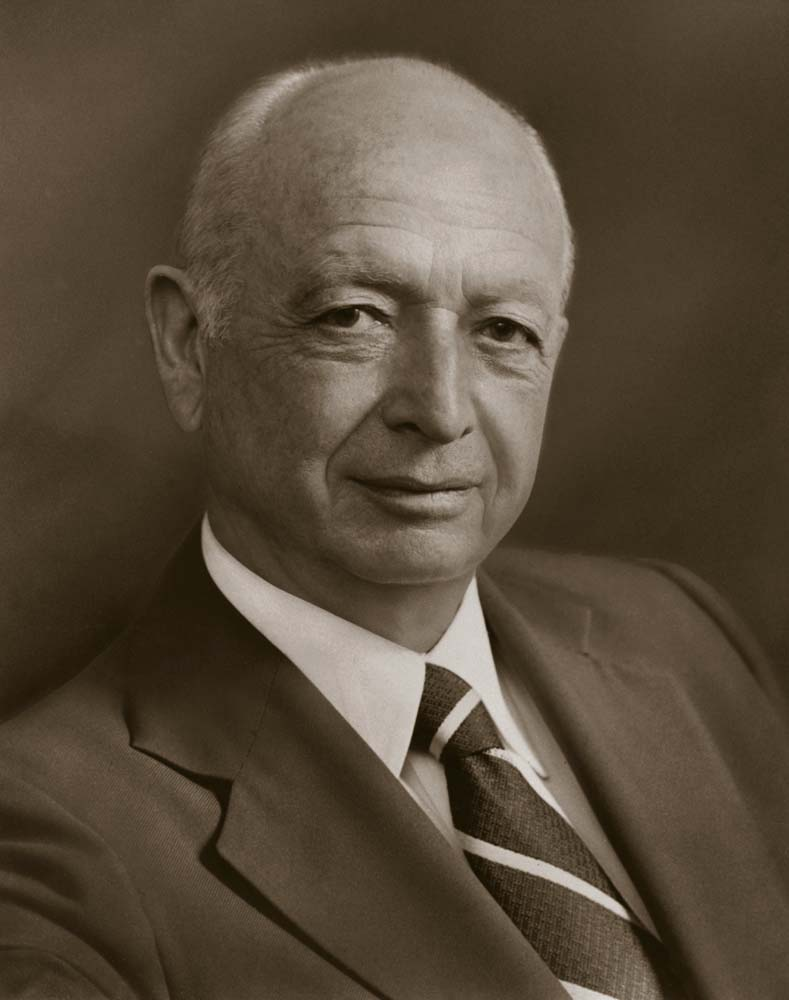
Howard Payne House

Howard Payne House, M.D. (1908 – August 1, 2003) was born in Indianapolis, Indiana. House founded the House Ear Institute in 1946 in Los Angeles, CA, and is often considered to be the father of modern otology. The House Ear Institute developed the cochlear implant and the auditory brain stem implant.

House perfected multiple critical otologic surgical procedures, such as the fenestration operation in the 1940s and the stapedectomy surgery in the subsequent three decades. He performed more than 30,000 of these procedures restoring hearing to those affected by otosclerosis.

House treated Ronald Reagan, James Stewart, Bob Hope, and other notable figures. His wife's name is Helen and they have three children: Kenneth House, who is a noted psychoanalyst; Caroline House, who is an Olympic swimmer; and John House, who is the current president of the House Ear Institute.

In 1972, he received the Golden Plate Award of the American Academy of Achievement.

In 1975, House was awarded an honorary Doctor of Science (Sc.D.) degree from Whittier College.
