= Intracranial epidermoid cyst =

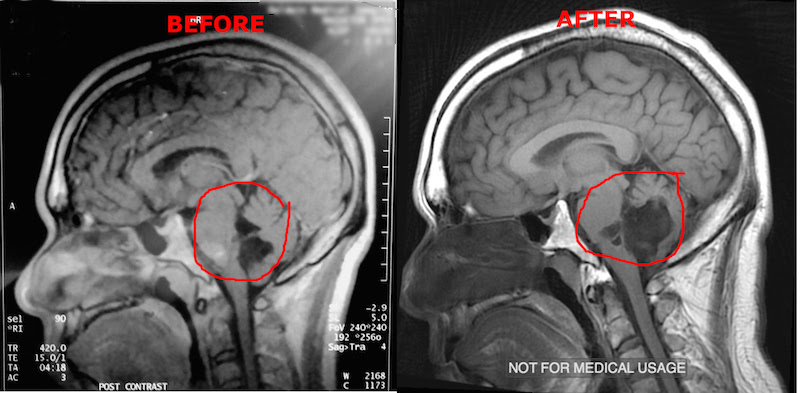
Intracranial Epidermoid Cyst - MRI scans 10.5 years apart

Intracranial epidermoid cysts develop in the early embryonic phases. The cysts develop when epithelial cells are confined with cells that form the brain.

== Signs and symptoms ==
Review of past cases, patients often do not exhibit many symptoms or obtain a diagnosis until they are around 20 to 40 years old. If the patient does show symptoms, it is most likely due to pressure from growth of the tumor. Depending on which part the epidermoid is pressing against can result in varying symptoms.

- Headaches – often worse in the morning or by changing positions; can be constant and become more severe or more frequent; not your typical headache
- Vision problems like blurred vision, double vision, or loss of peripheral vision, including hemianopia [new reference]
- Loss of sensation or movement in the arms, legs, or face
- Dizziness or difficulty with balance and walking, unsteadiness, vertigo
- Speech difficulties
- Confusion in everyday matters or disorientation
- Seizures, especially in someone who hasn’t had seizures before
- Hearing loss or buzzing or ringing in the ear
- Swallowing or speech difficulty
- Fatigue or sleepiness especially in children

== Cause ==
These tumors arise when epidermal cells become trapped during neural tube closure. This occurs between the 3rd to 5th week of fetal development.

== Pathophysiology ==
The chances of intracranial epidermoids is about 1% of all brain tumors. This benign tumor of the brain is made up of normal skin cells (stratified epithelial lining) on the outside, and fatty acids and keratin are on the inside of the tumor or sac. Only the sticky outer membrane is alive thus sticking to brain tissues and nerves.

Epidermoid tumors strongly adhere to the brain stem or cranial nerves. Often the lining of the tumor connected to the brain stem or parts difficult to "peel" away are left behind leaving residual tumor after surgery, this can contribute to the risk of regrowth.

About 40% of these cysts originate in the cerebellopontine angle.

== Diagnosis ==
Magnetic resonance imaging (MRI) and computed tomography (CT) brain scans can be used to identify these tumors.

== Treatment ==
Treatment to remove these tumors always involve radical surgery. The reported recurrence rate for a subtotal removal is 30% after a mean interval period of 8.1 years. Surgery is the primary treatment for removal of the brain tumor. Use of an endoscope may assist on obtaining a more complete surgical removal from hidden recesses.

It has been seen that a few patients have tumors that grow unusually fast, especially after surgery. After surgery it is highly suggested the patients get quarterly MRI's to monitor their tumors or as per neurosurgeons/neurologists order. If monitoring the tumor, it is suggested to use the same facility for each scan. Using different facilities can result in minor variations in the scan which can result in false measurements of the brain tumor.

Intracranial epidermoid tumors are slow growing lesions, which may recur after incomplete removal during surgery, although it will most likely take many years. These slow growing benign brain tumors envelop nerves and arteries rather than displacing them.
