= By Appointment Only (2007 film) =

- Written by: Ally Walker Richard O. Lowry
- Directed by: John Terlesky
- Starring: Ally Walker
- Theme music composer: Alex Wilkinson
- Country of origin: United States
- Original language: English

Production
- Running time: 93 minutes

Original release
- Release: 2007

By Appointment Only is a 2007 thriller television film starring and written by Ally Walker. Jordan Garrett received a nomination for Best Performance in a TV Movie, Miniseries or Special – Supporting Young Actor at the 29th Young Artist Awards.

== Cast ==
- Ally Walker as Val Spencer
- Currie Graham as Jake Brenner
- Marnette Patterson as Angie
- Jordan Garrett as Nick Spencer
- Suzanne Ford as Mary Vance
- Brian Howe as Jim
- Eddie Velez as Detective Sosa
