= House–Brackmann score =

Score to grade the degree of nerve damage in a facial nerve palsy

- Purpose: measure degree of damage in facial nerve palsy

The House–Brackmann score is a score to grade the degree of nerve damage in a facial nerve palsy. The measurement is determined by measuring the upwards (superior) movement of the mid-portion of the top of the eyebrow, and the outwards (lateral) movement of the angle of the mouth. Each reference point scores 1 point for each 0.25 cm movement, up to a maximum of 1 cm. The scores are then added together, to give a number out of 8. The score predicts recovery in those with Bell's palsy.

The score carries the name of the Dr John W. House and Dr Derald E. Brackmann, otolaryngologists in Los Angeles, California, who first described the system in 1985. It is one of a number of facial nerve scoring systems, such as Burres-Fisch, Nottingham, Sunnybrook, and Yanagihara. Of these, the Nottingham scale has been identified as possibly being easier and more reproducible. A modification of the original House–Brackmann score, called the "Facial Nerve Grading Scale 2.0" (FNGS2.0) was proposed in 2009.

Of note, a score of 1-3 indicates full eye closure, whereas a score of 4-6 indicates incomplete eye closure.

| Grade | Description | Measurement | Function % | Estimated function % |
|---|---|---|---|---|
| I | Normal | 8/8 | 100 | 100 |
| II | Slight | 7/8 | 76–99 | 80 |
| III | Moderate | 5/8–6/8 | 51–75 | 60 |
| IV | Moderately severe | 3/8–4/8 | 26–50 | 40 |
| V | Severe | 1/8–2/8 | 1–25 | 20 |
| VI | Total | 0/8 | 0 | 0 |
