= Cerebellopontine angle =

Structure between the cerebellum and pons

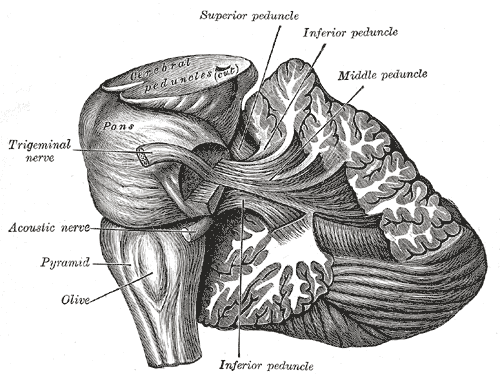
- Dissection showing the projection fibers of the cerebellum

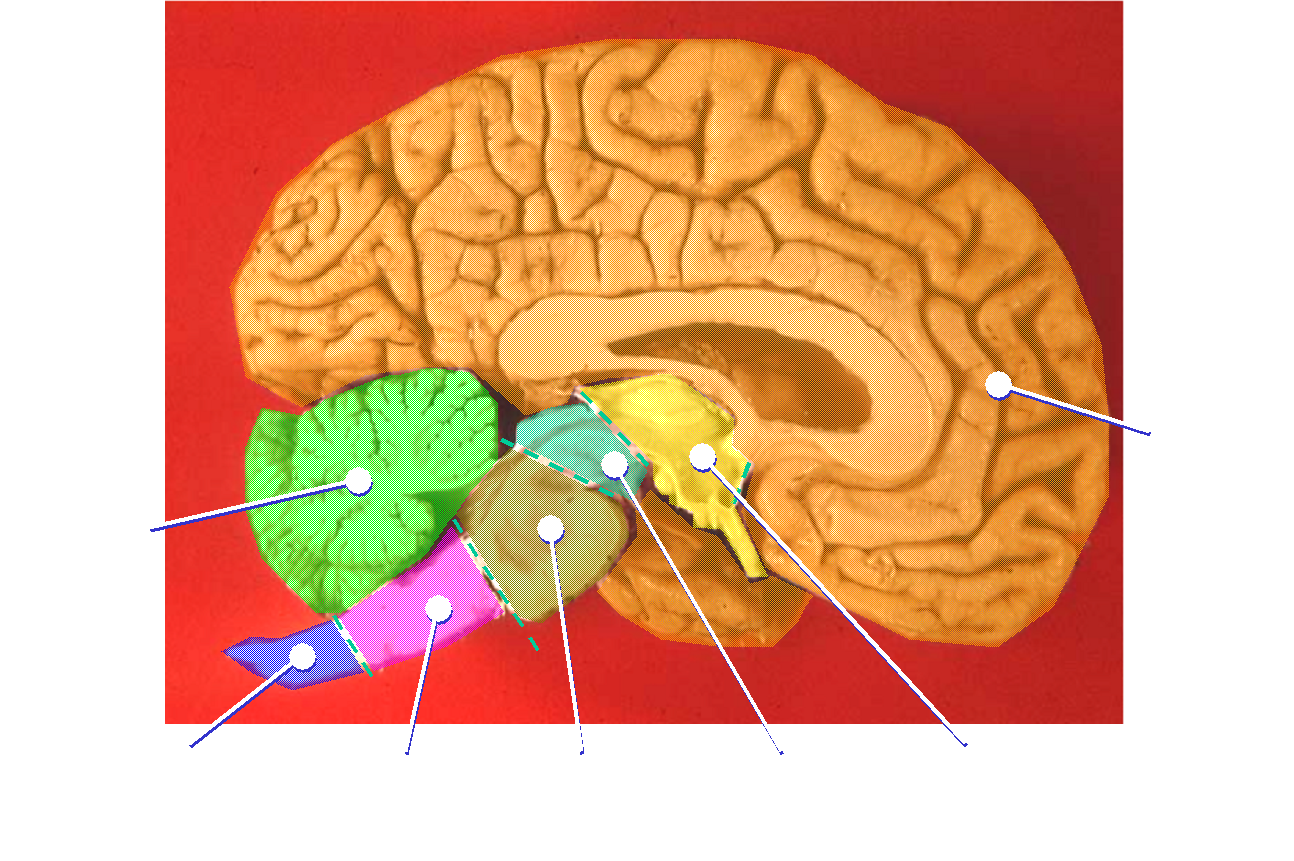
- Angle shown between cerebellum (bright green) and pons (beige) as it meets from the cerebrum

Details

Identifiers
- Latin: Angulus pontocerebellaris
- MeSH: D002530
- NeuroNames: 544
- TA98: A14.1.05.004
- TA2: 5922
- FMA: 84358

The cerebellopontine angle (CPA) (Latin: angulus cerebellopontinus) is located between the cerebellum and the pons. The cerebellopontine angle is the site of the cerebellopontine angle cistern.

The cerebellopontine angle is also the site of a set of neurological disorders known as the cerebellopontine angle syndrome.

== Structure ==
The cerebellopontine angle is formed by the cerebellopontine fissure. This fissure is made when the cerebellum folds over to the pons, creating a sharply defined angle between them. The angle formed in turn creates a subarachnoid cistern, the cerebellopontine angle cistern. The pia mater follows the outline of the fissure and the arachnoid mater continues across the divide so that the subarachnoid space is dilated at this area, forming the cerebellopontine angle cistern.

The anterior inferior cerebellar artery (AICA) is the principal vessel of the cerebellopontine angle. It also contains two cranial nerves – the vestibulocochlear nerve and the facial nerve; the cerebellar flocculus and the lateral recess of the fourth ventricle.

== Clinical significance ==
Tumours can arise in the cerebellopontine angle. Four out of five of these tumours are vestibular schwannomas (commonly known as acoustic neuromas).

Others found include:

- Arachnoid cyst
- Facial nerve tumour
- Lipoma
- Meningioma
- Schwannoma of other cranial nerves (e.g. CN V >VII>IX, X, XI)
- Metastasis
- Intracranial epidermoid cyst
