= Vestibular schwannoma =

Benign tumor of the vestibulocochlear cranial nerve

- Other names: Acoustic neuroma, acoustic neurilemmoma, perineural fibroblastoma, neurinoma of the acoustic nerve, neurofibroma of the acoustic nerve, schwannoma of the acoustic nerve
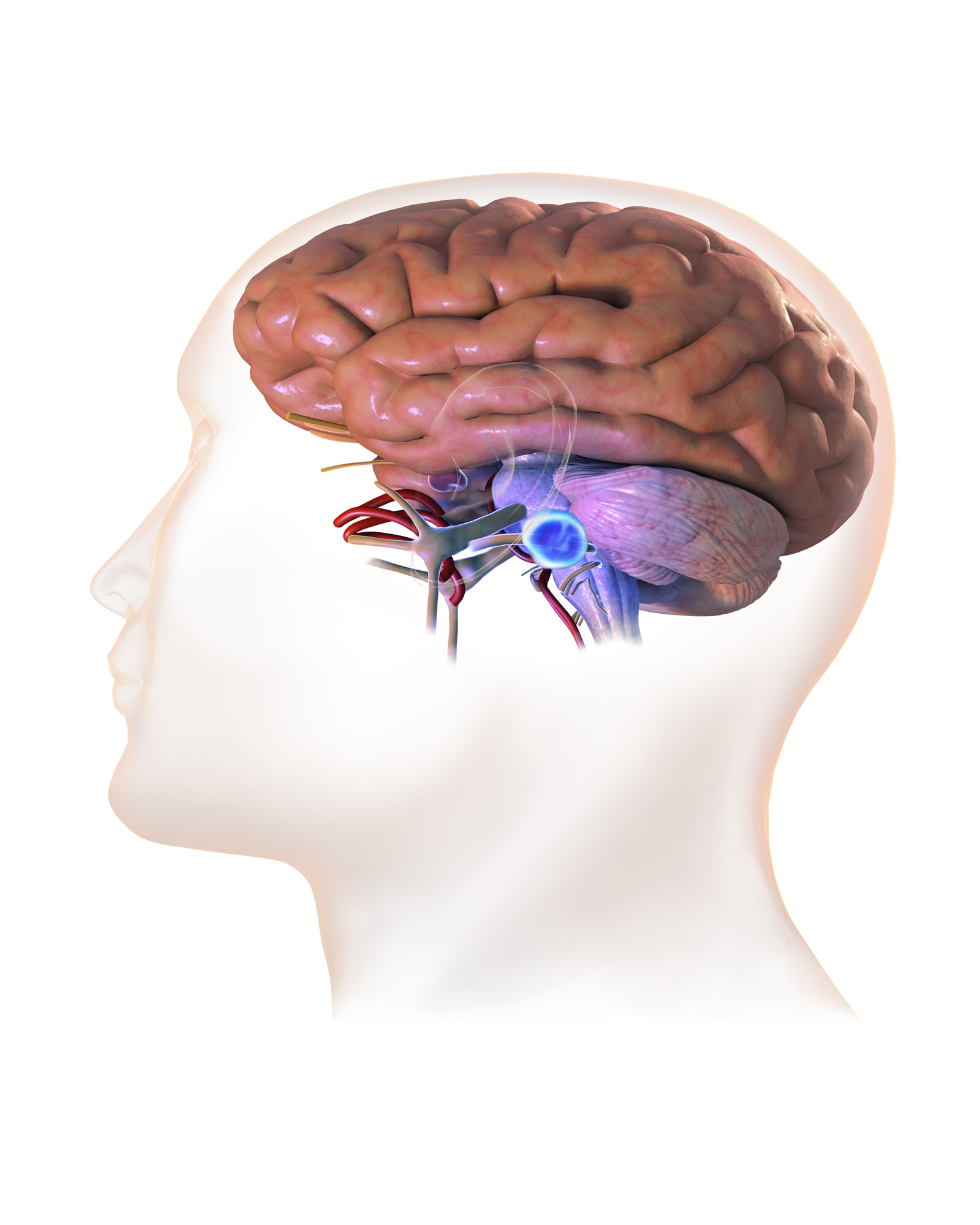
- 3D rendering of a vestibular schwannoma
- Specialty: Neuro-oncology
- Symptoms: Gradual hearing loss, dizziness, tinnitus
- Complications: Brain tumor growth; unilateral facial paralysis, single-sided hearing loss
- Types: Sporadic vestibular schwannoma (VS); Neurofibromatosis type II (NF2)
- Diagnostic method: Hearing exam, MRI exam
- Prevention: Tumor management
- Treatment: Radiosurgery and radiotherapy
- Prognosis: Variable, based on size of tumor; larger brain tumors may result in brainstem compression, headache, vomiting, vertigo, fatigue, mental disorientation, coma, and death; results in less acute circumstances by advanced specialists in the field have reduced mortality rates to near 1%
- Frequency: Very rare

A vestibular schwannoma (VS), also called acoustic neuroma, is a benign tumor that develops on the vestibulocochlear nerve that passes from the inner ear to the brain. The tumor originates when Schwann cells that form the insulating myelin sheath on the nerve malfunction. Normally, Schwann cells function beneficially to protect the nerves which transmit balance and sound information to the brain. However, sometimes a mutation in the tumor suppressor gene, NF2, located on chromosome 22, results in abnormal production of the cell protein named Merlin, and Schwann cells multiply to form a tumor. The tumor originates mostly on the vestibular division of the nerve rather than the cochlear division, but hearing as well as balance will be affected as the tumor enlarges.

The great majority of these VSs (95%) are unilateral, in one ear only. They are called "sporadic" (i.e., by chance, non-hereditary). Although non-cancerous, they can do harm or even become life-threatening if they grow to press on other cranial nerves and vital structures such as the brainstem. Variations in the mutation determine the nature of the tumor's development. The only environmental exposure that has been definitely associated with the growth of a VS is therapeutic radiation exposure to the head.

== Symptoms of sporadic VS ==
Sporadic VSs originate within the confining bony walls of the small (ca. 2 cm long) internal auditory canal. The most common early symptoms of these intracanalicular (IAC) VSs are gradual hearing loss and a feeling of fullness in the affected ear, some imbalance or dizziness, and tinnitus (ringing or other noise in the ear). Gradual single-sided hearing loss in the high frequencies is the first most obvious symptom for the great majority of patients. Headache as a presenting symptom of VS specifically is rare; facial symptoms (facial numbness, weakness) usually occur only as the tumor grows out of the canal and/or after therapeutic treatment. Delayed diagnosis and misdiagnosis are not unusual. Initial hearing loss is usually subtle and may be attributed mistakenly to aging, earwax buildup, or perhaps exposure to some loud environmental noise. A sudden hearing loss, which is uncommon, might be misdiagnosed as Ménière's disease, an abnormality of the inner ear that also has tinnitus as a symptom. The brain's vestibular system usually compensates for early balance problems.

There have been cases of tumors that were actually asymptomatic until very large and at a critical stage. Tumor growth rates are highly variable: some small VSs (perhaps 50%) do not grow at all; some few grow for a time and then shrink; some appear dormant but suddenly grow rapidly. In general, although studies differ, VSs that grow are slow-growing at an average rate of 1.2 to 1.9 mm per year. IAC tumors that grow beyond 1.5 cm in diameter expand into the relatively empty space of the cerebellopontine angle, taking on the characteristic 'ice-cream-cone' appearance seen on MRIs. As 'space-occupying-lesions,' the tumors can reach 3 to 4 cm or more in size and infringe on the facial nerve (facial expression) and trigeminal nerve (facial sensation). Advanced hearing loss and spells of true vertigo may occur. Very large tumors are life-threatening when they press on the cerebellum or cause brainstem compression. Late symptoms of very large VS include headache, nausea, vomiting, sleepiness, mental confusion and eventually coma.

== Neurofibromatosis type 2 (NF2) ==
For the most part, unilateral sporadic vestibular schwannomas are readily treated successfully by modern medical techniques. Having bilateral VSs is a more troublesome condition. Bilateralism is considered to be the hallmark and main diagnostic criterion of neurofibromatosis type II (NF2), a genetic disorder that is heritable, progressive, difficult to manage, and has a roughly 50% likelihood of being passed on to each offspring. NF2 patients tend to have a more severe mutation, although there are mild mosaic cases in which only some cells carry the mutation. Genetic testing confirming mutation of the NF2 gene is recommended.

About 50% of people with NF2 have a de novo mutation, and about 50% of these new mutations will be mild mosaic cases, which are less likely to be passed on. NF2 patients may develop other cranial and spinal tumors. NF2 develops during the teens or early adulthood, whereas sporadic VSs are diagnosed mostly in patients between the ages of 40 and 60. Both varieties of VS (sporadic and NF2) are very rare, accounting for only about 8% of all primary brain tumors. The incidence of NF2 is approximately 1 per 60,000 people.

== Tumor sizes ==
Patient surveys in the U.S. by the national Acoustic Neuroma Association (1998, 2007–08, 2012, 2014) showed that the percentage of diagnosed tumors 1.5 cm or less increased significantly from 23% to 47%. Researchers in Denmark reported (2004): "The size of diagnosed tumors has decreased from a median of 35 mm in 1979 to 10 mm in 2001." In general, tumor size (diameter) is described as small (less than 1.5 cm), medium (1.5 to 2.5 cm), large (2.5 to 4.0 cm) and giant (more than 4.0 cm). (Note: 1 inch = 2.54 cm) Radiologists reporting on MRI scans use the Koos Grading Scale which relates tumor size to its proximity to the brainstem and nearby cranial nerves. Thus Koos grade 1 is a purely intrameatal (IAC) tumor, 1–10 mm in size; Koos grade 2, 10–20 mm, has extended into the cerebellopontine angle (CPA), but with no brainstem contact; Koos grade 3, 20–30 mm, fills the CPA space and touches on the brainstem, but without compression; and Koos grade 4, more than 30 mm in size, compresses the brainstem and nearby nerves, and displaces critical arteries.

== Diagnosis ==
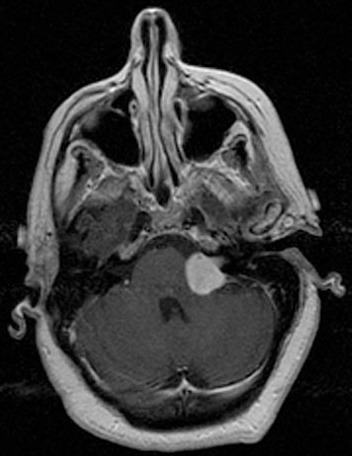
Unilateral vestibular schwannoma

Preliminary diagnostic procedures include ear examination, hearing and vestibular testing. Typical symptoms include unilateral tinnitus, progressive hearing loss and vertigo. Usually diagnostic sensitivity is increased with one or more otological symptom. The rate of VS pick up with unilateral tinnitus alone using MRI has been shown to be <0.1%. The auditory brainstem response test (ABR) is a cost-effective test to see if a VS has perhaps compromised the cochlear nerve.

Computed tomography (CT scan) of the head will detect moderate to large sized VS but can miss small sized VS. VS appears as isodense to surrounding brain parenchyma on CT. VS does not have calcifications in it. A large VS may expand the size of internal acoustic meatus (IAC) and may compromise hearing function because the nerves within the IAC are compressed, particularly the cochlear nerve. However, the facial nerve is less commonly affected. The main advantage of a CT scan is to assess the extent of bony involvement by VS. VS enhances when iodinated contrast is given. A contrasted CT scan of the temporal bone can be done if the patient is unable to undergo MRI scan.

MRI scan is the imaging of choice because it can more accurately differentiate the mass from other tumors such as meningioma, facial nerve schwannoma, epidermoid cyst, arachnoid cyst, aneurysm, and brain metastasis. MRI scan also helps in surgical planning and follow-up of the tumor after surgery. VS is usually isointense on T1 weighted images, hyperintense on T2 weighted images, and enhances after given gadolinium contrast.

== Management ==
=== Microsurgery for sporadic VS ===
The Guidelines on the Treatment of Adults with Vestibular Schwannoma issued in 2018 by the Congress of Neurological Surgeons in the U.S. looked at the long-term evolution of treatments for VS. The Introduction to the Guidelines stated: "The evolution in treatment over the last century has ultimately led to an environment where functional outcome has taken precedence over disease eradication. With multiple noninvasive management options available, the tolerance of cranial neuropathy in patients with small and medium-sized tumors is low. Today, hearing preservation, facial nerve function, and tumor control remain the primary benchmarks used to evaluate treatment effectiveness and compare outcomes." In other words, tumor management was able to give greater attention to preserving quality of life.

The three main surgical approaches to the tumor are the translabyrinthine (incision behind the ear to reach the bony labyrinth), the retrosigmoid (incision behind the ear to reach cerebellopontine angle) and the middle cranial fossa (incision in front of the ear to access the IAC from above). Tumor size is a major factor in determining approach selection. Adjunctive use of the endoscope for enhanced visualization during surgery for IAC tumors has gained attention as an emerging technique with advancing technology. For large tumors, a 'facial nerve sparing surgery' offers partial removals, to be followed (as needed) by stereotactic radiosurgery or radiotherapy for 'residuals'. The rate of 'tumor control' appeared to be similar to that for gross total removal surgeries. For small to medium size tumors, the appropriateness of so-called 'hearing preservation surgery' via either the middle fossa or retrosigmoid approach remained controversial. Data from Denmark indicated that primary observation offered the best chance to preserve good hearing the longest. But preserving good hearing in the affected ear remained an elusive goal. Even during observation, although tumors showed no significant growth, hearing deterioration occurred. Stangerup et al. reported (2010) that most patients with 100% speech discrimination at diagnosis had the best chance of maintaining good hearing after ten years of observation.

The overall mortality rate for VS surgery is around 0.2% - 0.5%. The most common complications include facial nerve disorder (25.0%), cerebrospinal fluid leakage (8.5%) and postoperative neurological complications (8.4%).

=== Radiosurgery and radiotherapy ===
The 'Patient Survey' in the U.S. in 2014 by the national Acoustic Neuroma Association showed that 29% of VS patients reported radiosurgery (17%) or radiotherapy (12%) as their treatment of choice. Radiosurgery is the delivery to the VS of a concentrated high radiation dose in a one-day session, whereas radiotherapy involves multiple treatment sessions where the total radiation dose is spread out in fractions over a few days or 3–4 weeks. The main objective in either case is 'tumor control' by damaging tumor cell DNA and stopping blood vessel proliferation (angiogenesis) needed for tumor growth.

Tumors may swell following radiation, but this increase in size is transient and does not signal a failed procedure. The average success rate for stereotactic radiosurgery is reported to be 95.5%. Radiation doses are calculated in terms of Gray/Gy—the measure of energy deposited by ionizing radiation per kilogram of matter. Since VSs are noninvasive and well-demarcated from surrounding tissues, radiosurgeons are able to target the tumor volume closely and minimize normal tissue damage. Multisession radiotherapy recommends the advantage of giving time between sessions for biological repair of any damage to normal tissues that may occur, and allows for radiation of the tumor at different times in the cell growth cycle.

The CyberKnife radiation system introduced in 1994 recommends a protocol of three sessions known as hypofractionation. Radiation dosages overall were reduced over the years as experience showed that excellent tumor control rates could be maintained even as dosages were lowered to benefit hearing preservation and facial nerve function. Generally, single-session Gamma Knife radiosurgery is limited in use to VSs less than 3 cm in diameter to avoid possible complications with facial nerves, brainstem and the cochlea apparatus. The risk of radiation-induced secondary tumors is very small, in the range of 0.01-0.02%. The risk for NF2 patients appears to be slightly higher.

=== Medical and gene therapies ===
To date, there is no fully efficacious medical therapy for VS. The complexity of the molecular biology research involved is truly challenging. Clinical trials are in progress for other drugs such as everolimus, lapatinib and mifepristone. Common aspirin has been studied as a low-risk therapeutic option, but emerging evidence suggests that aspirin and other NSAID use may not prevent VS tumor growth.

=== Observation of small VS ===
The 1991 NIH Consensus Statement observed: "There is evidence that some patients with unilateral vestibular schwannoma and a subgroup of patients with NF2 may have tumors that fail to progress rapidly, resulting in stable neurologic function for a long time. The use of MRI with contrast enhancement has resulted in the identification of patients with very small, relatively asymptomatic vestibular schwannomas for whom the natural history is unknown. Conservative management may be appropriate for these patients." At the time, conservative management (i.e., observation, 'wait-and-watch'/'wait-and-scan') was reserved mainly for elderly or infirm patients.

Data on tumor sizes at diagnosis and tumor growth behavior was sparse or contradictory and mainly short-term. The Central Brain Tumor Registry of the United States, established in 1992, only began to keep records for benign tumors like VS in 2004. In 2006, a landmark study from Denmark, entitled "The Natural History of Vestibular Schwannoma," initiated a significant trend toward observation for managing small VS. Researchers in Copenhagen had the advantage that data for all Danish patients diagnosed with VS since 1976 was entered into a national database. The 2006 study by Stangerup et al. looked at the data for 1,818 patients (1976–2004) comparing intrameatal VS (in the auditory canal) and extrameatal VS (into the cerebellopontine angle). Remarkably, for the 729 patients having observation management via interval MRI scans, tumor growth was observed in only 17% of intrameatal tumors and 29% of extrameatal tumors. The mean observation time was 3.6 years (range 1–15 years). The researchers concluded: "VS growth occurs within the first 5 years after diagnosis in a limited number of tumors, primarily in tumors with an extrameatal extension. These findings justify primary observation of small tumors." The medical community and VS patients responded positively to these findings.

'Patient Surveys' in the U.S. by the national Acoustic Neuroma Association showed an increase in "Wait-and-Watch" from 4% of respondents in 1998 to 20% in 2012. An important study in 2015 entitled "The Changing Landscape of Vestibular Schwannoma Management in the United States – A Shift Toward Conservatism," predicted that half of all cases of VS would be managed initially with observation by 2026. Stangerup et al. have urged caution (2019): "Most studies show that if tumor growth occurs, it is usually detected within the first few years of diagnosis. However, long-term observational studies are desperately needed to guide the development of evidence-based surveillance algorithms designed to detect late tumor progression." Also (see Medical and Gene Therapies, above): "Basic science and identification of genes, molecular pathways, and networks related to tumor growth are likely to change our approach to treatment including conservative management."

== Incidence of sporadic VS ==
In 2015, researchers at the Cleveland Clinic in Ohio used population-based data of the Central Brain Tumor Registry of the U.S. to calculate an incidence of 10.9 per million of population, or about 3,300 cases of VS per year. A higher incidence up to 29.3 per million of population was found for the 65-74 year-old age group. There was no significant difference in incidence by gender. Incidence was higher in Asian Pacific Islanders, and lower in African Americans and Hispanics. The annual number of diagnosed VS increased significantly worldwide by the early 1990s with the introduction of magnetic resonance imaging (MRI). Notably, epidemiologists in Denmark (population of 5.7 million in 2015) reported 193 cases of VS for 2015—an incidence of 34 per million of population per year. The first MRI scanner in Denmark was functional in 1989, and by 2015 the number increased to approximately 100.

== History ==
=== Early descriptions ===
In 1777, Eduard Sandifort of Leiden, the Netherlands, wrote a postmortem first description of a vestibular schwannoma. He observed "a certain hard body adherent to the auditory nerve," and concluded this cause of deafness was beyond the reach of medication or surgery and was therefore incurable. The Schwann cells that multiply to form a VS on the vestibulocochlear nerve were identified 60 years later in 1838 by the German physiologist Theodor Schwann. In 1895, Thomas Annandale, a general surgeon at the Royal Infirmary in Edinburgh, Scotland, was the first to successfully localize and surgically remove a VS. Finger dissection of VS to 'shell out' the tumor was typical. The main goal when dealing with large tumors was preservation of life.

=== Early operations ===
In the early 1900s the mortality rate for VS surgery was in the range of 75 to 85%. Surgeons typically delayed invasive intervention as long as possible as a last resort. Harvey Cushing (1869–1939) is known as 'the father of neurosurgery for VS.' His basic study published in 1917 was entitled Tumors of the Nervus Acusticus and the Syndrome of the Cerebellopontine Angle. Cushing perfected the retrosigmoid surgical approach, and by doing suboccipital craniotomy and subtotal removals he was able to reduce mortality to 4% by 1931. Cushing worked at Brigham Hospital in Boston. An equally famous specialist for VS at Johns Hopkins in Baltimore was Walter E. Dandy (1886–1946), a former pupil of Cushing who advocated total tumor removals. In 1931, he reported a complete removal with preservation of the facial nerve.

=== Imaging ===
A major problem for the pioneers in VS neurosurgery was the lack of adequate imaging for spotting small tumors. Treating tumors that grew overly large in the cerebellopontine angle resulted in poor outcomes for the goals of facial nerve and hearing preservation. For imaging, conventional X-rays began to be used in the 1920s and CT scanners were introduced in the 1960s, but all were superseded by 'gold standard' MRIs in the 1980s. Facial nerve monitoring was added in 1979. William F. House (1923–2012) pioneered the use of the operating microscope, and (with William Hitselberger) popularized the translabyrinthine and middle fossa surgery approaches for VS. The operating microscope would be used in virtually all operations by 1998. House's son, John W. House, proposed (1983) and, with Derald E. Brackmann, developed the House-Brackmann grading system for reporting facial nerve outcomes following VS surgery.

=== Treatment ===
==== Surgical treatment ====
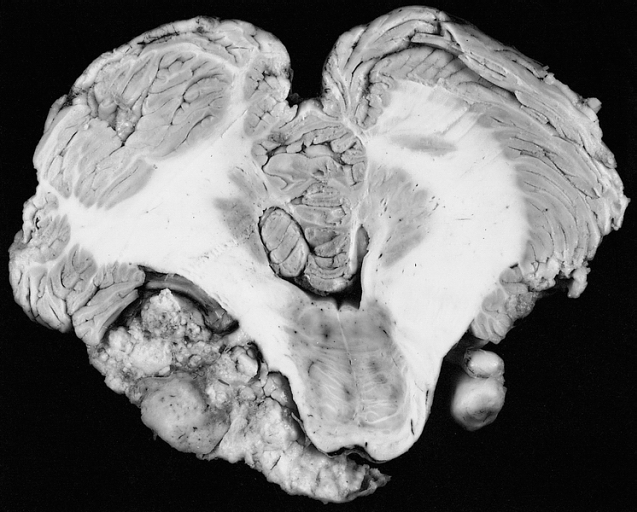
Bilateral schwannomas in a patient with neurofibromatosis type II

In 1986, at a meeting for neurosurgeons in San Francisco, the House group endorsed a guideline for the surgical treatment of VS: "The best opportunity for successful removal of an acoustic neuroma is when it is small: when first diagnosed." At the time of the NIH Consensus Development Conference for Acoustic Neuroma in 1991, microsurgery was definitely the predominant management strategy for VS. The consensus conference's panel of experts reported: "Currently, the ideal treatment for symptomatic patients with vestibular schwannoma is the total excision of the tumor in a single stage with minimal morbidity and mortality and with preservation of neurological function." Total surgical removal was not, however, the only treatment indicated at the time. Partial removal was used to debulk very large VSs threatening to compress vital structures. And long-term observation management was deemed appropriate as MRI scans began to reveal more and more small tumors with stable neurological symptoms.

==== Radiosurgery ====
By the 1980s, radiation therapy was also becoming an attractive option for VS patients. At the Karolinska Institute in Stockholm, Sweden, Lars Leksell (1907–1986) pioneered Gamma Knife radiosurgery. In 1951, he published his landmark scientific paper, "The Stereotaxic Method and Radiosurgery of the Brain," defining radiosurgery as "the destruction of intracranial targets without opening the skull using very high doses of ionizing radiation in stereotactically directed beams." The first Gamma Knife machine was operable in Sweden in 1969, and the first Gamma Knife in the U.S. was installed in 1987 at the Presbyterian University Hospital in Pittsburgh, PA. Departments of radiation oncology at major medical centers began to modify X-ray linear accelerators (linacs) to do single-session radiosurgery and multiple-session radiotherapy. In 1991, the U.S. National Institutes of Health convened a Consensus Development Conference (December 11–13, 1991) for Acoustic Neuroma (Vestibular Schwannoma) to evaluate management of the disorder and recommend areas for future activity and research."

==== Medical and gene therapies ====
The 1991 NIH Consensus Statement recommended attention to "the development of pharmaceutical and other alternative medical treatments, such as tumor suppressing agents." Ideally, a drug could be found to permanently shrink or eradicate VSs, with minimal side effects. A key step forward in 1993 was the identification of the NF2 gene and its protein product Merlin, which modulates the complex molecular signaling pathways that control cell proliferation. These pathways that drive VS formation (tumorigenesis) and growth are currently under investigation.

A second important field of study in molecular biology investigates ways to stop the formation (angiogenesis) of the new blood vessels that are needed to support tumor growth by supplying nutrients and oxygen. In 1998, the glycoprotein named VEGF (vascular endothelial growth factor) that initiates proliferation was discovered. An anti-VEGF drug named bevacizumab (Avastin) was developed and showed promise in stopping this vascular proliferation. Unfortunately, when tested for NF2 tumors, the therapy required prolonged treatment resulting in hypertension and impaired wound healing.

The development of a new generation of drugs may become a secondary therapy in view of advances in genome editing during the 1990s that led to the invention of CRISPR in 2009. CRISPR has become the preferred genome editing tool whereby diseases may be treated by correcting causative mutations directly in a patient's genome.

== Notable people ==
American actor, director, humanitarian, social activist and film producer Mark Ruffalo was diagnosed with vestibular schwannoma in 2001 which resulted in a period of partial facial paralysis. He recovered from the paralysis; however, he became deaf in his left ear as a result of the tumor.

Guitarist/composer/producer David Torn was diagnosed with an acoustic neuroma in 1992. It required intricate surgery that left him deaf in the right ear and burdened by many other health obstacles.

American actress and designer Tara Subkoff was diagnosed with schwannoma in 2009. She successfully underwent surgery, but was left with permanent nerve damage and deafness in her right ear.

Tionne Watkins, better known by her stage name T-Boz, R&B singer from the R&B/hip-hop group TLC, was diagnosed with a strawberry-sized acoustic neuroma on her vestibular nerve in 2006. Many physicians refused to remove the tumor due to her sickle-cell-related complications, leaving her alternatives grim. Ultimately, she underwent surgery at Cedars-Sinai Hospital in Los Angeles.

English comedian, artist, surrealist, musician, actor, and television presenter Vic Reeves revealed that he was diagnosed with a grape-sized vestibular schwannoma at age 62. He has lost all hearing in the left ear as a result.

== See also ==
- Cerebellopontine angle syndrome
