= William F. House =

American physician

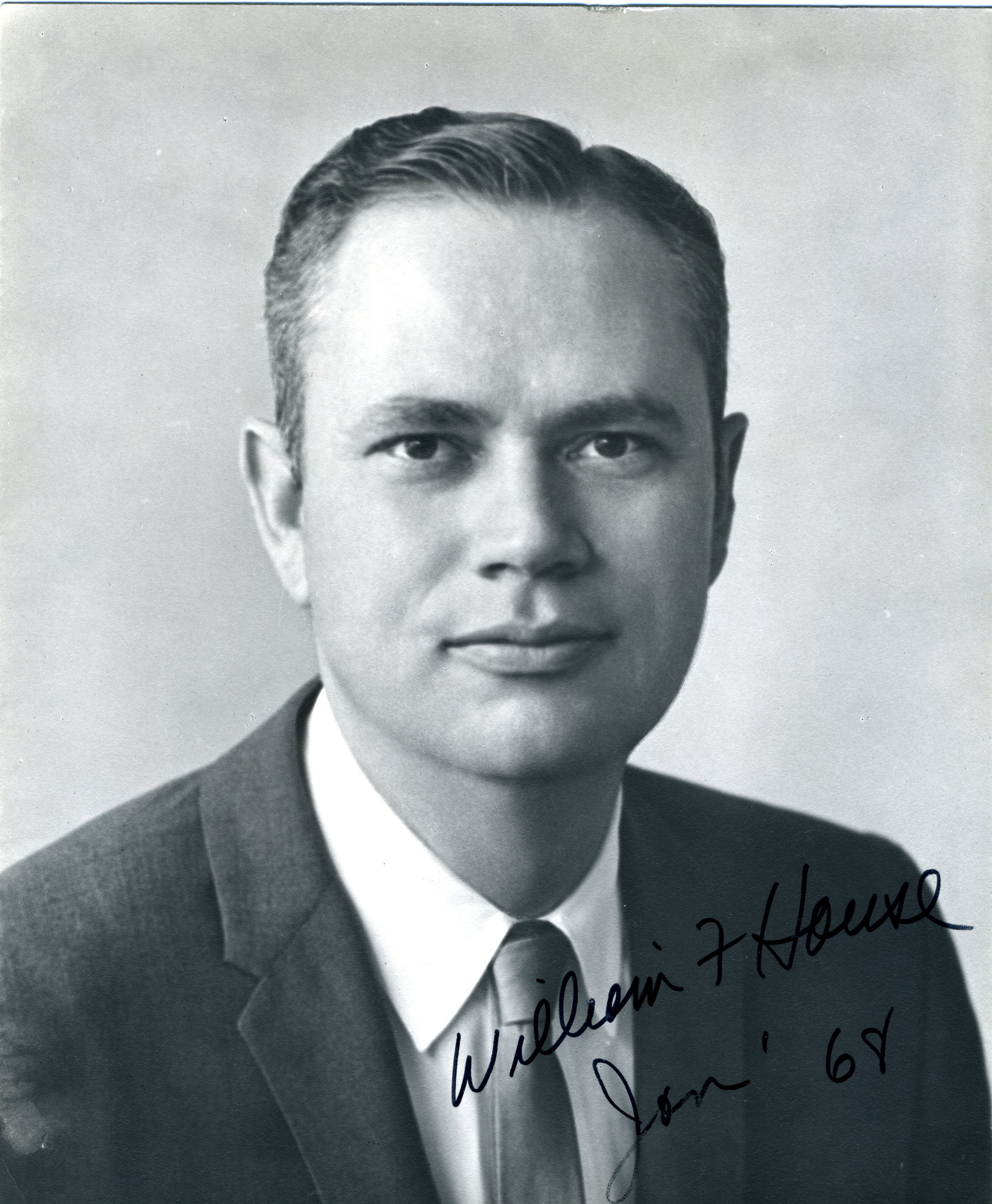
- House in 1968
- Born: William Fouts House; December 1, 1923; Kansas City, Missouri, U.S.
- Died: December 7, 2012 (aged 89); Aurora, Oregon, U.S.
- Education: University of California, Berkeley; University of Southern California
- Known for: inventing cochlear implant

William Fouts House (December 1, 1923 – December 7, 2012) was an American otologist, physician and medical researcher who invented and developed the cochlear implant. The cochlear implant is considered to be the first invention to restore not just the sense of hearing, but any of the five senses in humans, in general. House also pioneered approaches to the lateral skull base for removal of tumors, and is considered "the Father of Neurotology".

== Biography ==
House was born on December 1, 1923, in Kansas City, Missouri, and moved to Whittier, California, when he was three years old. House completed pre-dental degrees at Whittier College and the University of Southern California. He then enrolled at the University of California, Berkeley, where he received a doctorate in dentistry in 1945. He then served as a dental officer in the United States Navy Dental Corps from 1946 to 1948. After serving in the navy, House earned a medical degree from the University of Southern California in 1952. His older half brother, Howard P. House, was also a physician and was focused on otology, founding the House Ear Institute (later renamed the House Research Institute) in 1946. William House eventually adopted the same focus.

House was heavily criticized by physicians and surgeons during much of his career. Many believed his idea of a device to electrically stimulate the ear would never work. Today, however, he is generally regarded as a hero, in that his innovative research and development led to the creation of the modern cochlear implant.

House's first design for a cochlear implant was surgically implanted in 1961, but the implant was rejected by the patient's body. A longer-lasting model was developed and successfully implanted in 1969, and it was introduced commercially in 1972. He trained several surgeons in cochlear implant surgery; including Robert Sataloff.

One of the patients treated by House was astronaut Alan Shepard. Shepard was the first American and the second person to go to outer space in 1961. In 1971, he became the fifth person to walk on the Moon after undergoing an endolymphatic-subarachnoid shunt procedure performed by House to treat his Ménière's disease.

In 1987, House was awarded an honorary Doctor of Science (ScD) degree from Whittier College.

== Death ==
House died on December 7, 2012, at his home in Aurora, Oregon, at the age of 89.
