= Posturography =

Posturography is the technique used to quantify postural control in upright stance in either static or dynamic conditions. Among them, Computerized dynamic posturography (CDP), also called test of balance (TOB), is a non-invasive specialized clinical assessment technique used to quantify the central nervous system adaptive mechanisms (sensory, motor and central) involved in the control of posture and balance, both in normal (such as in physical education and sports training) and abnormal conditions (particularly in the diagnosis of balance disorders and in physical therapy and postural re-education). Due to the complex interactions among sensory, motor, and central processes involved in posture and balance, CDP requires different protocols in order to differentiate among the many defects and impairments which may affect the patient's posture control system. Thus, CDP challenges it by using several combinations of visual and support surface stimuli and parameters.

Clinical applications for CDP were first described by L.M. Nashner in 1982, and the first commercially available testing system was developed in 1986, when NeuroCom International, Inc., launched the EquiTest system.

== Working ==
Static posturography is carried out by placing the patient in a standing posture on a fixed instrumented platform (forceplate) connected to sensitive detectors (force and movement transducers), which are able to detect the tiny oscillations of the body. Dynamic posturography differentiates from static posturography generally by using a special apparatus with a movable horizontal platform. As the patient makes small movements, they transmit in real time to a computer. The computer is also used to command electric motors which can move the forceplate in the horizontal direction (translation) as well as to incline it (rotations). Thus, the posturography test protocols generate a sequence of standardized motions in the support platform in order to disequilibrate the patient's posture in an orderly and reproducible way. The platform is contained within an enclosure which can also be used to generate apparent visual surround motions. These stimuli are calibrated relative to the patient's height and weight. A special computer software integrates all this and produces detailed graphics and reports which can then be compared with normal ranges.

== Components of balance ==
Center of gravity (COG) is an important component of balance and should be assessed when evaluating someone's posture. COG is often measured with COP (Center of pressure) because COG is hard to quantify. According to Lafage et al. (2008) the COG should be located at the midpoint of the base of support if an individual has ideal posture. COP excursion and velocity are indicators of control over COG and are key factors for identifying proper posture and the ability to maintain balance. COP excursion is defined by Collins & De Luca (1992) as the Euclidean*LINK* displacement in the anterior/posterior and medial/lateral directions within the base of support (perimeter around the feet). With poor posture and / or exaggerated spinal curvatures it is possible that the COP excursion would increase which can cause instability as the COP shifts towards the perimeter of the base of support.

== Types of tests ==
Equitest conditions

The test protocols usually include a Sensory Organization Test (SOT), Limits of Stability Test (LOS), a Motor Control Test (MCT) and an Adaptation Test (ADT). The SOT test was developed by Nashner and is a computerized system that is made up of dual movable force plates and movable visual screen (EquiTest). During the test the patient is instructed to stand still and quietly with eyes open or closed depending on which of the six tests is being administered. The patient performs multiple trials per test; a description of these tests can be found in the table below. The SOT test is based on the fact that there are three sensory systems mainly involved in maintaining balance (vision, vestibular, and proprioceptive). Minute spontaneous body sways are measured as well as reactions provoked by unexpected abrupt movements of the platform and the visual surroundings. Differences in these sways and reactions to system perturbations help to determine the patients ability to effectively use visual, vestibular, and proprioceptive input to maintain posture. Wrisley et al. (2007) found that there are learning effects associated with the SOT test and therefore it could be used clinically to assess, improve and track changes in balance.

| Condition | Vision | Surface | Visual Surround |
|---|---|---|---|
| 1 | Eyes Open | Stable | Stable |
| 2 | Eyes Closed | Stable | Stable |
| 3 | Eyes Open | Stable | Sway-Referenced |
| 4 | Eyes Open | Sway-Referenced | Stable |
| 5 | Eyes Closed | Sway-Referenced | Stable |
| 6 | Eyes Open | Sway-Referenced | Sway-Referenced |

| Condition | Patterns of abnormality on SOT analysis | | | | | | |
| Condition | Vestibular abnormalities | | | Multisensory abnormalities^{a} | | | Extrasensory abnormalities^{b} |
|---|---|---|---|---|---|---|---|
| 1 | | | | | | | Scores in 4, 5 and 6 are equal or better than in 1, 2, 3. |
| 2 | | | | | | | Scores in 4, 5 and 6 are equal or better than in 1, 2, 3. |
| 3 | | | | | | | Scores in 4, 5 and 6 are equal or better than in 1, 2, 3. |
| 4 | | | | | | | Scores in 4, 5 and 6 are equal or better than in 1, 2, 3. |
| 5 | | | | | | | Scores in 4, 5 and 6 are equal or better than in 1, 2, 3. |
| 6 | | | | | | | Scores in 4, 5 and 6 are equal or better than in 1, 2, 3. |
| Conclusions | Inability to make effective use of vestibular information | Inability to suppress the influence of inaccurate visual information ("visual preference") | Inability to make effective use of vestibular information AND to suppress the influence of inaccurate visual information | No effective use of either visual or vestibular information (dependence on somatosensory input for balance) | No effective use of either visual or vestibular information AND vision dependence | Dependence on visual and somatosensory inputs | Scores in 4, 5 and 6 are equal or better than in 1, 2, 3. |
^{a} Vestibular and extravestibular pathology^{b} Anxiety, simulation, exaggeration, etc.

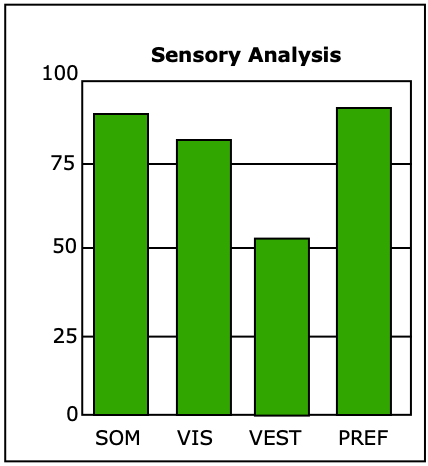
Sensory Analysis - EquiTest

SOT results are subdivided in an Equilibrium Score, a Sensory Analysis, a Strategy Analysis and COG Alignment. The sensory analysis calculates 4 different scores: somatosensory (SOM), visual (VIS), vestibular (VEST) and visual preference (PREF) (otherwise known as "visual dependence", an excessive reliance on visual information even when it is inappropriate). The scores are respectively calculated as ratios of the 6 different scores of the equilibrium score:

$\text{Somatosensory (SOM)} = \frac{\text{condition 2}}{\text{condition 1}}$

$\text{Visual (VIS)} = \frac{\text{condition 4}}{\text{condition 1}}$

$\text{Vestibular (VEST)} = \frac{\text{condition 5}}{\text{condition 1}}$

$\text{Visual Preference (PREF)} = \frac{\text{conditions 3 + 6}}{\text{conditions 2 + 5}}$

MCT results include instead the Weight Symmetry, both for forward and for backward translations, Latency Scores for forward and backward translations, and Amplitude Scaling, which refers to the capacity of the participant to generate a response force adequate to the entity of the perturbation.

The limits of stability (LOS) is defined as the distance outside the base of support that can be traveled before a loss of balance occurs. The LOS test is frequently used to quantify this distance and has been suggested as a hybrid between static and dynamic balance assessment. During this test the patient stands on the platform as directed above in the SOT test. The patient watches their movements on a screen so they can see each of the eight LOS targets. The patient begins with their COP directly in the center of the targets (displayed as a figure as a computerized person). At the onset of the test, the patient attempts to lean in the direction of the indicated perimeter target, without lifting their feet, and hold there until the test is complete.

According to necessity of the diagnostic workup, CDP can be combined with other techniques, such as electronystagmography (ENG) and electromyography.

The main indications for CDP are dizziness and vertigo, and postural imbalances (balance disorders).

== See also ==
- Balance disorders
- Vestibular system

== Sources ==
- Nashner LM et al. Adaptation to altered support and visual conditions during stance: patients with vestibular deficits. J Neurosci. 1982 May;2(5):536-44. Medline abstract
- Monsell EM, et al. Technology assessment: computerized dynamic platform posturography". Otolarynogol Head Neck Surg 1997, 117:394-398. Medline abstract
- Goebel, JA (Editor). Practical Management of the Dizzy Patient. Lippincott Williams & Wilkins Publ. 2000.
