= List of medical tests =

A medical test is a medical procedure performed to detect, diagnose, or monitor diseases, disease processes, susceptibility, or to determine a course of treatment. The tests are classified by speciality field, conveying in which ward of a hospital or by which specialist doctor these tests are usually performed.

The ICD-10-CM is generally the most widely used standard by insurance companies and hospitals who have to communicate with one another, for giving an overview of medical tests and procedures. It has over 70,000 codes. This list is not exhaustive but might be useful as a guide, even though it is not yet categorized consistently and only partly sortable.

== The list ==
Where available ICD-11, where not ICD-10 codes are listed.

| ICD-10 | Name | Sample Analysed | Tool used to collect sample | Analysed by(lab type) | Used by what clinical branch? |
|---|---|---|---|---|---|
| MD73 | Temperature measurement | (non-invasive) Skin-contact | a thermometer | A microchip in the tool | Consulting Room Tests(meaning most of them??) |
| MD75 | Patient's Respiratory rate measurement | (non-invasive) observation | (timer) | A microchip in the tool | Consulting Room Tests |
| MD76 | Blood oxygen concentration measurement | (non-invasive) | Pulseoxymeter | A microchip in the tool | Consulting Room Tests |
| MD72 | taking the patient's pulse | (non-invasive) palpation | medical professional fingers | the medical professional | Consulting Room Tests |
| MD70 | weighing, and measuring height and girth | (non-invasive) | Weight | A microchip in the tool | Consulting Room Tests |
| MD74 | measuring blood pressure | (non-invasive) | A manometer | A Manometric display | Consulting Room Tests |
| ME31 | abdominal palpation | (non-invasive) | | | Consulting Room Tests |
| ME32 | cardiac ausculation | (non-invasive) | A stethoscope | the medical professional or A microchip in the tool | Consulting Room Tests |
| ME35 | HEENT examination | | | | Consulting Room Tests |
| ME34 | digital rectal examination | | | | Consulting Room Tests |
| ME36 | neurological examination | | | | Consulting Room Tests |
| NC72 | psychiatric assessment | | | | Consulting Room Tests |
| ME33 | pulmonary auscultation | | | | Consulting Room Tests |
| ME30 | vaginal examination | | | | Consulting Room Tests |
| KA61 | coronary catheterization | | | | Cardiovascular |
| KA62 | echocardiography | | | A microchip in the tool | Cardiovascular |
| KA63 | electrocardiogram | | | A microchip in the tool | Cardiovascular |
| | ballistocardiogram | | | | Cardiovascular |

== Dermatology ==
- skin allergy test
- skin biopsy

== Ear, Nose and Throat ==
- hearing test
- laryngoscopy
- vestibular tests
  - electronystagmography (ENG)
  - videonystagmography (VNG)

Alternative list for Ear, Nose and Throat

| ICD-11 Procedure Code | Name | Sample/Material analysed or examined | Tool used | Performed by / Unit | Used by what clinical branch? |
|---|---|---|---|---|---|
| AB20 (ICD-11) | Hearing test | Auditory function | Audiometer | Audiology / ENT Department | Otorhinolaryngology / Audiology |
| AB30 (ICD-11) | Laryngoscopy | Larynx (voice box) | Laryngoscope (rigid or flexible) | ENT Department | Otorhinolaryngology |
| AB40 (ICD-11) | Vestibular tests | Vestibular (balance) system function | Various vestibular testing devices | ENT Department / Neurotology Unit | Otorhinolaryngology / Neurology |
| AB41 (ICD-11) | Electronystagmography (ENG) | Vestibular system and eye movement | Electrodes to record eye movements | ENT Department / Neurotology Unit | Otorhinolaryngology / Neurology |
| AB42 (ICD-11) | Videonystagmography (VNG) | Vestibular system and eye movement | Infrared video goggles | ENT Department / Neurotology Unit | Otorhinolaryngology / Neurology |

== Gastrointestinal ==
- capsule endoscopy
- coloscopy
- endoscopic retrograde cholangiopancreatography
- esophagogastroduodenoscopy
- esophageal motility study
- esophageal pH monitoring
- liver biopsy

Alternative list Gastrointestinal

| ICD code | Name | Sample/Material analysed or examined | Tool used | Performed by / Laboratory | Used by what clinical branch? |
|---|---|---|---|---|---|
| DB41 (ICD-11) | Capsule endoscopy | Gastrointestinal tract (small bowel images) | Capsule endoscope (swallowed) | Gastroenterology / Endoscopy Unit | Gastroenterology |
| DB40 (ICD-11) | Colonoscopy | Large intestine (colon) | Flexible colonoscope | Gastroenterology / Endoscopy Unit | Gastroenterology |
| DB43 (ICD-11) | Endoscopic retrograde cholangiopancreatography (ERCP) | Biliary and pancreatic ducts | Side-viewing duodenoscope with fluoroscopy | Gastroenterology / Interventional Endoscopy | Gastroenterology / Hepatology |
| DB39 (ICD-11) | Esophagogastroduodenoscopy (EGD) | Esophagus, stomach, duodenum | Flexible upper endoscope | Gastroenterology / Endoscopy Unit | Gastroenterology |
| DB64 (ICD-11) | Esophageal motility study | Esophageal muscle function (manometry data) | Esophageal manometry catheter | Gastroenterology / Motility Lab | Gastroenterology / Motility Disorders |
| DB65 (ICD-11) | Esophageal pH monitoring | Esophageal acid exposure (pH data) | pH probe catheter or wireless capsule | Gastroenterology / Motility Lab | Gastroenterology / Motility Disorders / GERD |
| 4A82 (ICD-11) | Liver biopsy | Liver tissue | Percutaneous biopsy needle or transjugular approach | Pathology Laboratory / Interventional Radiology | Hepatology / Pathology |

== Hematology ==
- bone marrow examination

== Laboratory ==
- biochemistry
  - Arterial blood gas (ABG)
  - Complete blood count (CBC)
  - Comprehensive metabolic panel (CMP) (including CHEM-7)
  - coagulation tests
  - C-reactive protein
  - Erythrocyte sedimentation rate (ESR)
  - FibroTest
  - urea breath test
  - urinalysis
    - Agostini's reaction
- cytogenetics and Molecular Genetics
  - Genetic testing
- immunology
  - autoantibodies
- microbiology
  - blood culture
  - mantoux test
  - sputum culture
  - stool culture
  - urine culture

Where available ICD-11, where not ICD-10 codes are listed.

See also: https://en.m.wikipedia.org/wiki/Category:Blood_tests and Blood test,

| ICD code | Name | Sample Analysed | Tool used to collect sample | Analysed by (lab type) | Used by what clinical branch? |
|---|---|---|---|---|---|
| 3E23 (ICD-11) | Biochemistry | Blood (serum/plasma) | Venipuncture needle and syringe or vacutainer | Clinical Chemistry Laboratory | Internal Medicine / Laboratory Medicine |
| ME24 (ICD-11) | Arterial blood gas (ABG) | Arterial blood | Arterial puncture with heparinized syringe | Clinical Chemistry / Blood Gas Lab | Critical Care / Pulmonology |
| 4A00 (ICD-11) | Complete blood count (CBC) | Venous blood | Venipuncture needle and tube with EDTA | Hematology Laboratory | Hematology / General Medicine |
| 3E20 (ICD-11) | Comprehensive metabolic panel (CMP) (including CHEM-7) | Blood (serum/plasma) | Venipuncture | Clinical Chemistry Laboratory | Internal Medicine / Laboratory Medicine |
| QE31 (ICD-11) | Coagulation tests | Venous blood | Venipuncture, citrate tubes | Coagulation Laboratory | Hematology / Laboratory Medicine |
| ME24.20 (ICD-11) | C-reactive protein (CRP) | Blood (serum) | Venipuncture | Immunology / Clinical Chemistry Lab | Rheumatology / Infectious Disease |
| ME24.30 (ICD-11) | Erythrocyte sedimentation rate (ESR) | Venous blood | Venipuncture, EDTA or citrate tube | Hematology Laboratory | Rheumatology / General Medicine |
| 4B61 (ICD-11) | FibroTest | Blood (serum) | Venipuncture | Clinical Chemistry / Specialized Lab | Hepatology |
| QE21 (ICD-11) | Urea breath test | Exhaled breath | Breath collection bags or device | Microbiology / Specialized Lab | Gastroenterology / Infectious Disease |
| X80.3 (ICD-10) | Urinalysis | Urine | Midstream urine collection container | Clinical Chemistry / Microbiology Lab | Nephrology / Laboratory Medicine |
| Z51.89 (ICD-10)* | Agostini's reaction | Blood serum | Venipuncture | Immunology Laboratory | Immunology / Infectious Disease |
| NC11 (ICD-11) | Cytogenetics and Molecular Genetics | Blood, bone marrow, tissue samples | Venipuncture / biopsy instruments | Genetics Laboratory | Genetics / Oncology / Hematology |
| NC11 (ICD-11) | Genetic testing | Blood, saliva, tissue | Venipuncture / saliva kit | Genetics Laboratory | Genetics / Prenatal Diagnosis / Oncology |
| ME23 (ICD-11) | Immunology | Blood serum/plasma | Venipuncture | Immunology Laboratory | Allergy / Autoimmune Diseases |
| ME24.40 (ICD-11) | Autoantibodies | Blood serum | Venipuncture | Immunology Laboratory | Rheumatology / Autoimmune Diseases |
| QA21 (ICD-11) | Microbiology | Varies: blood, sputum, stool, urine | Swabs, syringes, containers depending on sample | Microbiology Laboratory | Infectious Disease / Clinical Microbiology |
| QA21 (ICD-11) | Blood culture | Blood (venous) | Venipuncture, blood culture bottles | Microbiology Laboratory | Infectious Disease |
| QA21 (ICD-11) | Mantoux test | Intradermal injection site (skin) | Tuberculin syringe | Immunology / Infectious Disease Clinic | Infectious Disease / Pulmonology |
| QA21 (ICD-11) | Sputum culture | Sputum | Sterile sputum container | Microbiology Laboratory | Pulmonology / Infectious Disease |
| QA21 (ICD-11) | Stool culture | Stool | Sterile stool container | Microbiology Laboratory | Gastroenterology / Infectious Disease |
| QA21 (ICD-11) | Urine culture | Urine | Midstream urine collection container | Microbiology Laboratory | Nephrology / Infectious Disease |

- Agostini's reaction is historical; exact ICD codes may vary.

== Neurological ==
- electroencephalogram
- electromyography (EMG)
- lumbar puncture
- neuropsychological tests

== Obstetric / Gynaecological ==
- amniocentesis
- colposcopy
- mammography
- hysteroscopy
- laparoscopy
- Smear tests such as Pap smears

== Ocular ==
- dilated fundus examination
- multifocal electroretinography (mfERG)
- optical coherence tomography (OCT)
- visual field test

== Pulmonary ==
- polysomnography
- pulmonary pletysmography
- thoracentesis

== Radiology ==
- CT scan (B*2****)
- magnetic resonance imaging (MRI) (B*3****)
- nuclear medicine (C******)
- positron-emission tomography (PET)
- projectional radiography (B*0****)
- ultrasonography (B*4****)

Alternative list formatting:

== Radiology ==
| ICD-11 Procedure Code | Name | Sample/Material analysed or examined | Tool used | Performed by / Unit | Used by what clinical branch? |
|---|---|---|---|---|---|
| B20**** | CT scan | Body tissues/organs | Computed Tomography scanner | Radiology Department | Radiology / Diagnostic Imaging |
| B30**** | Magnetic resonance imaging (MRI) | Body tissues/organs | MRI scanner | Radiology Department | Radiology / Diagnostic Imaging |
| C***** | Nuclear medicine | Functional and anatomical imaging using radiotracers | Gamma camera, PET scanner | Nuclear Medicine Department | Nuclear Medicine / Radiology |
| C7Z0 (PET specific ICD-11) | Positron-emission tomography (PET) | Functional imaging with positron-emitting radiotracers | PET scanner | Nuclear Medicine Department | Nuclear Medicine / Radiology |
| B00**** | Projectional radiography | Body parts (bones, chest, etc.) | X-ray machine | Radiology Department | Radiology / Diagnostic Imaging |
| B40**** | Ultrasonography | Soft tissues, organs, blood flow | Ultrasound machine (transducer/probe) | Radiology Department / Sonography Unit | Radiology / Diagnostic Imaging |

== Rheumatologic ==
- arthroscopy

== Urologic ==
- cystoscopy
- urodynamic testing

== Feces ==
format - ( Normal Order Name; Designation in the laboratory; Laboratory)
Pancreatic elastase;Feces-Pancreatic elastase;Clinical Biochemistry Laboratory;
Adenovirus DNA PCR;Adenovirus DNA PCR - Feces; Clinical Microbiology Laboratory;
"Hemoglobin;F";Feces-Blood; Clinical biochemistry laboratory;
"Calprotectin;F";"Fecal Calprotectin;massfr."; Clinical biochemistry laboratory;
Worms, eggs and cysts (microscopy of formalin-ether concentrate);Worms, eggs and cysts (microscopy of formalin-ether concentrate); Clinical Microbiology Laboratory;
Larviculture (Strongyloides, hookworms);Larviculture (Strongyloides, hookworms); Clinical Microbiology Laboratory;
Clostridioides difficile;Clostridioides difficile DNA/RNA (PCR quicktest); Clinical Microbiology Laboratory;
Tarmpato e parasites;PCR (Tarmprotozoer); Clinical Microbiology Laboratory;
Diarrhea investigation;Diarrhea investigation; Clinical Microbiology Laboratory;

Alternative list Gastrointestinal stool and parasite tests The following analyses (Normal Order Name; Designation in the laboratory; Laboratory) can be performed on fecal samples.

| ICD code | Normal Order Name | Designation in the laboratory | Sample analysed | Laboratory | Used by what clinical branch? |
|---|---|---|---|---|---|
| 3E23 (ICD-11) | Pancreatic elastase | Feces-Pancreatic elastase | Feces | Clinical Biochemistry Laboratory | Gastroenterology / Laboratory Medicine |
| 1B20 (ICD-11) | Adenovirus DNA PCR | Adenovirus DNA PCR - Feces | Feces | Clinical Microbiology Laboratory | Infectious Disease / Microbiology |
| 3E22 (ICD-11) | Hemoglobin | Feces-Blood | Feces | Clinical Biochemistry Laboratory | Gastroenterology / Laboratory Medicine |
| 3E23 (ICD-11) | Calprotectin | Fecal Calprotectin; massfr. | Feces | Clinical Biochemistry Laboratory | Gastroenterology / Inflammatory Bowel Disease |
| 1B60 (ICD-11) | Worms, eggs and cysts (microscopy of formalin-ether concentrate) | Worms, eggs and cysts (microscopy of formalin-ether concentrate) | Feces | Clinical Microbiology Laboratory | Parasitology / Infectious Disease |
| 1B60 (ICD-11) | Larviculture (Strongyloides, hookworms) | Larviculture (Strongyloides, hookworms) | Feces | Clinical Microbiology Laboratory | Parasitology / Infectious Disease |
| 1B23 (ICD-11) | Clostridioides difficile | Clostridioides difficile DNA/RNA (PCR quicktest) | Feces | Clinical Microbiology Laboratory | Infectious Disease / Gastroenterology |
| 1B62 (ICD-11) | Tarmpato e parasites (intestinal protozoa) | PCR (Tarmprotozoer) | Feces | Clinical Microbiology Laboratory | Parasitology / Infectious Disease |
| 1B60 (ICD-11) | Diarrhea investigation | Diarrhea investigation | Feces | Clinical Microbiology Laboratory | Infectious Disease / Gastroenterology |

== Ascites fluid ==
the following analysis of the format - ( Normal Order Name; Designation in the laboratory; Laboratory), can be performed on the sample material in the title of the heading above
"Hem. Marker study, ADULTS over 16 years;Asc";Hem. Marker examination, ADULTS over 16 years, Ascites fluid;Hematology marker laboratory
"Erythrocytes;Asc";"Asc-Erythrocytes; count";Clinical Biochemistry Laboratory
"Erythrocytes;Asc";"Asc-Erythrocytes; numberk";, Clinical Biochemistry Laboratory
"Leukocytes(mononuclear);Asc";"Asc-Leukocytes(mononuclear); count";Clinical Biochemistry Laboratory
"Leukocytes(polynucleus);Asc";"Asc-Leukocytes(polynucleus); count";Clinical Biochemistry Laboratory
"Nucleated cells;Asc";"Asc-Nucleated cells; count";Clinical Biochemistry Laboratory
"Nucleated cells;Asc";"Asc-Nucleated cells; numberk";Clinical Biochemistry Laboratory
"Carbamide;Asc";"Asc-Carbamide; substancek";Clinical Biochemistry Laboratory
"Calcium;Asc";"Asc-Calcium(II); substance c.";Clinical Biochemistry Laboratory
"Phosphate;Asc";"Asc-Phosphate(P; inorganic); substance";Clinical Biochemistry Laboratory
"Triglyceride;Asc";"Asc-Triglyceride; substance";Clinical Biochemistry Laboratory
"Bilirubins;Asc";Asc-Bilirubins, substance;Clinical Biochemistry Laboratory
"Albumin;Asc";"Asc-Albumin; bulk";Clinical Biochemistry Laboratory
"Protein;Asc";"Asc-Protein; mass spec.";Clinical Biochemistry Laboratory
"Amylase, pancreatic type;Asc";"Asc-Amylase, pancreatic type;cat.k.";Clinical Biochemistry Laboratory
"Lactate dehydro ase;Asc";"Asc-Lactate dehydro ase;.";Clinical Biochemistry Laboratory
"Cholesterol;Asc";"Asc-Cholesterol+ester; substance c.";Clinical Biochemistry Laboratory
"Ascites group;Asc";"A

Alternative list for Ascites fluid analyses:

The following analyses (Normal Order Name; Designation in the laboratory; Laboratory) can be performed on the sample material Ascites fluid.

| ICD-11 Code | Normal Order Name | Designation in the Laboratory | Sample analysed | Laboratory | Used by what clinical branch? |
|---|---|---|---|---|---|
| 3E70 | Hem. Marker study, ADULTS over 16 years | Hem. Marker examination, ADULTS over 16 years, Ascites fluid | Ascites fluid | Hematology Marker Laboratory | Hematology / Clinical Pathology |
| Erythrocytes | Asc-Erythrocytes; count | Ascites fluid | Clinical Biochemistry Laboratory | Clinical Chemistry / Pathology | |
| Erythrocytes | Asc-Erythrocytes; numberk | Ascites fluid | Clinical Biochemistry Laboratory | Clinical Chemistry / Pathology | |
| Leukocytes (mononuclear) | Asc-Leukocytes (mononuclear); count | Ascites fluid | Clinical Biochemistry Laboratory | Clinical Chemistry / Pathology | |
| Leukocytes (polynuclear) | Asc-Leukocytes (polynuclear); count | Ascites fluid | Clinical Biochemistry Laboratory | Clinical Chemistry / Pathology | |
| Nucleated cells | Asc-Nucleated cells; count | Ascites fluid | Clinical Biochemistry Laboratory | Clinical Chemistry / Pathology | |
| Nucleated cells | Asc-Nucleated cells; numberk | Ascites fluid | Clinical Biochemistry Laboratory | Clinical Chemistry / Pathology | |
| [Carbamide] | Asc-Carbamide; substancek | Ascites fluid | Clinical Biochemistry Laboratory | Clinical Chemistry / Nephrology | |
| [Calcium] | Asc-Calcium (II); substance c. | Ascites fluid | Clinical Biochemistry Laboratory | Clinical Chemistry / Metabolism | |
| [Phosphate] | Asc-Phosphate (P; inorganic); substance | Ascites fluid | Clinical Biochemistry Laboratory | Clinical Chemistry / Metabolism | |
| Triglyceride | Asc-Triglyceride; substance | Ascites fluid | Clinical Biochemistry Laboratory | Clinical Chemistry / Metabolism | |
| Bilirubins | Asc-Bilirubins; substance | Ascites fluid | Clinical Biochemistry Laboratory | Clinical Chemistry / Hepatology | |
| [Albumin] | Asc-Albumin; bulk | Ascites fluid | Clinical Biochemistry Laboratory | Clinical Chemistry / Hepatology | |
| Protein | Asc-Protein; mass spec. | Ascites fluid | Clinical Biochemistry Laboratory | Clinical Chemistry / Pathology | |
| [Amylase], pancreatic type | Asc-Amylase, pancreatic type; cat.k. | Ascites fluid | Clinical Biochemistry Laboratory | Clinical Chemistry / Gastroenterology | |
| Lactate dehydrogenase | Asc-Lactate dehydro ase | Ascites fluid | Clinical Biochemistry Laboratory | Clinical Chemistry / Pathology | |
| Cholesterol | Asc-Cholesterol + ester; substance c. | Ascites fluid | Clinical Biochemistry Laboratory | Clinical Chemistry / Metabolism | |

== Biopsy ==
the following analysis of the format - ( Normal Order Name; Designation in the laboratory; Laboratory), can be performed on the sample material in the title of the heading above
Leukemia: diagnosis/recurrence, Biopsy;; Clinical Immunology Laboratory, Tissue lab
"Aberrant cell population(phenotype); taxon;Biopsy(spec.)"; Clinical Immunology Laboratory, Tissue lab
rearrangement of TCR/IgH- is. Biopsy;"Biopsy-(TCR+Igh- )-Immune rearrangement; clonality(0 1) = ?"; Clinical Immunology Laboratory, Tissue lab
"Hem. Marker study, ADULTS over 16 years;Biopsy";Hem. Marker study, ADULTS over 16 years, Tissue biopsies;Hematology Marker Laboratory
"Hem. Marker study, ADULTS over 16 years;Biopsy";Hem. Marker Examination, ADULTS over 16 years, Biopsy from Corpus Vitreum;Hematology Marker Laboratory
Histologic examination of testis biopsy; Laboratory for Growth and Reproduction
Miscellaneous analysis;DNA(spec.)-MLPA ocular melanoma; depends
Miscellaneous analysis;FISH malignant melanoma choroidea; depends
Helicobacter pylori (culture);Helicobacter pylori (culture); Clinical Microbiology Laboratory
Tropheryma whipplei DNA/RNA;;Unknown
Culture and resistance;Biopsy/tissue/bone tissue culture and resistance; Clinical Microbiology Laboratory

== Cerebrospinal fluid; ==
the following analysis of the format - ( Normal Order Name; Designation in the laboratory; Laboratory), can be performed on the sample material in the title of the heading above
"Chorionic gonadotropin+beta [HCG];Csv";"Csv-Chorionic gonadotropin+beta chain; arb.stofk.(IS 75/589)";Clinical Biochemistry Laboratory
"alpha-1-Fotoprotein;Csv";"Csv-alpha-1-Fotoprotein; arb.stofk.";Clinical Biochemistry Laboratory
"Tick-borne encephalitis virus antibody; arb.k.(list; proc.);Csv";Tick-borne encephalitis virus antibody; Clinical Microbiology Laboratory
"Cerebrospinal fluid group;Csv";"Csv-Nucleated cell type; count(list)";Clinical Biochemistry Laboratory
"Erythrocytes;Csv";"Csv-Erythrocytes; count";Clinical Biochemistry Laboratory
"Nucleated cells;Csv";"Csv-Nucleated cells; count";Clinical Biochemistry Laboratory
"Nucleated cells;Csv";"Csv-Nucleated cells; count";Clinical Biochemistry Laboratory
"Leukocytes(mononuclear);Lkc(Csv)";"Csv-Mononuclear cells; count";Clinical Biochemistry Laboratory
"Leukocytes(mononuclear);Lkc(Csv)";"Csv-Leukocytes(mononuclear); count";Clinical Biochemistry Laboratory
"Leukocytes (polynucleus);Lkc(Csv)";"Csv-Leukocytes(polynucleus); count";Clinical Biochemistry Laboratory
"Leukocytes (polynuclear);Lkc(Csv)";"Csv-Polynuclear cells; count";Clinical Biochemistry Laboratory
"Neurofilament light polypeptide;Csv";Csv(cell-free);Neuroimmunology Laboratory
"Glucose;Csv";"Csv-Glucose; substance c.";Clinical Biochemistry Laboratory

Alternatively formatted list:

The following analyses (Normal Order Name; Designation in the laboratory; Laboratory) can be performed on cerebrospinal fluid (CSF) samples.

| ICD code | Normal Order Name | Designation in the laboratory | Sample analysed | Laboratory | Used by what clinical branch? |
|---|---|---|---|---|---|
| 3E23 (ICD-11) | Chorionic gonadotropin + beta [ HCG ] | Csv-Chorionic gonadotropin + beta chain; arb.stofk. (IS 75/589) | Cerebrospinal fluid (Csv) | Clinical Biochemistry Laboratory | Neurology / Oncology |
| 3E23 (ICD-11) | alpha-1-Fotoprotein | Csv-alpha-1-Fotoprotein; arb.stofk. | Cerebrospinal fluid (Csv) | Clinical Biochemistry Laboratory | Neurology / Oncology |
| 1B70 (ICD-11) | Tick-borne encephalitis virus antibody | Tick-borne encephalitis virus antibody; arb.k. (list; proc.) | Cerebrospinal fluid (Csv) | Clinical Microbiology Laboratory | Infectious Disease / Neurology |
| 3E24 (ICD-11) | Cerebrospinal fluid group | Csv-Nucleated cell type; count (list) | Cerebrospinal fluid (Csv) | Clinical Biochemistry Laboratory | Neurology / Laboratory Medicine |
| 3E24 (ICD-11) | Erythrocytes | Csv-Erythrocytes; count | Cerebrospinal fluid (Csv) | Clinical Biochemistry Laboratory | Neurology / Laboratory Medicine |
| 3E24 (ICD-11) | Nucleated cells | Csv-Nucleated cells; count | Cerebrospinal fluid (Csv) | Clinical Biochemistry Laboratory | Neurology / Laboratory Medicine |
| 3E24 (ICD-11) | Leukocytes (mononuclear) | Csv-Mononuclear cells; count | Cerebrospinal fluid (Csv) | Clinical Biochemistry Laboratory | Neurology / Immunology |
| 3E24 (ICD-11) | Leukocytes (polynuclear) | Csv-Leukocytes (polynucleus); count | Cerebrospinal fluid (Csv) | Clinical Biochemistry Laboratory | Neurology / Immunology |
| 4A21 (ICD-11) | Neurofilament light polypeptide | Csv (cell-free) | Cerebrospinal fluid (Csv) | Neuroimmunology Laboratory | Neurology / Neuroimmunology |
| ME24 (ICD-11) | Glucose | Csv-Glucose; substance c. | Cerebrospinal fluid (Csv) | Clinical Biochemistry Laboratory | Neurology / Laboratory Medicine |

== See also ==
1. List of distinct cell types in the adult human body
2. List of human microbiota(Human microbiome)
3. Composition of the human body
4. Lists of human genes
5. as well as all the list of the specific organ systems:like e. g: List of skeletal muscles of the human body, List of bones of the human skeleton, Tendon, List of nerves of the human body, List of arteries of the human body, List of veins of the human body
