= Balance disorder =

Physiological disturbance of perception

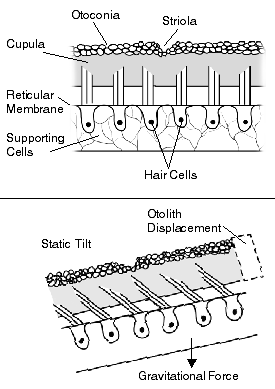
- The image shows the function of the otolith organs of the inner ear in sensing balance.
- Specialty: Neurology, Otolaryngology
- Symptoms: Unsteadiness, wooziness, dizziness, giddiness, sense of floating, vertigo, nausea
- Diagnostic method: Hearing and vision tests, ENG, VNG, rotary chair test, computerized dynamic posturography
- Treatment: Vestibular rehabilitation, medication, surgery, Tai chi

A balance disorder is a disturbance that causes an individual to feel unsteady, for example when standing or walking. It may be accompanied by feelings of giddiness, wooziness, or a sensation of movement, spinning, or floating. Balance is the result of several body systems working together: the visual system (eyes), vestibular system (ears) and proprioception (the body's sense of where it is in space). Degeneration or loss of function in any of these systems can lead to balance deficits.

== Signs and symptoms ==
Cognitive dysfunction (disorientation) may occur with vestibular disorders. Cognitive effects are not only spatial: attention, memory and executive function can also be affected. Vestibular dysfunction has been shown to adversely affect processes of attention and increased demands of attention can worsen the postural sway associated with vestibular disorders. Recent MRI studies also show that humans with bilateral vestibular damage (damage to both inner ears) undergo atrophy of the hippocampus which correlates with their degree of impairment on spatial memory tasks.

== Causes ==
Balance problems can occur when any of the vestibular, visual, or proprioceptive systems are disrupted. Abnormalities in balance function may indicate a wide range of pathologies from causes like inner ear disorders, low blood pressure, tumors such as acoustic neuroma, and brain injury including stroke.

=== Related to the ear ===
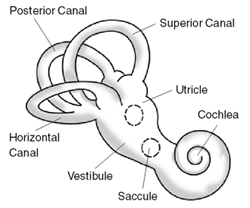
Different sections of semicircular canals. utricle and saccule are indicated by circles.

Causes of dizziness related to the ear are often characterized by vertigo (spinning) and nausea. Nystagmus (flickering of the eye, related to the Vestibulo-ocular reflex [VOR]) is often seen in patients with an acute peripheral cause of dizziness.

- Benign paroxysmal positional vertigo (BPPV) – The most common cause of vertigo. It is typically described as a brief, intense sensation of spinning that occurs when there are changes in the position of the head with respect to gravity. An individual may experience BPPV when rolling over to the left or right, upon getting out of bed in the morning, or when looking up for an object on a high shelf. The cause of BPPV is the presence of normal but misplaced calcium crystals called otoconia, which are normally found in the utricle and saccule (the otolith organs) and are used to sense movement. If they fall from the utricle and become loose in the semicircular canals, they can distort the sense of movement and cause a mismatch between actual head movement and the information sent to the brain by the inner ear, causing a spinning sensation.

=== Migraine ===
Migraine headaches are a common neurological disease. Although typical migraines are characterized by moderate to severe throbbing headaches, vestibular migraines may be accompanied by symptoms of vestibular disorders such as dizziness, disequilibrium, nausea, and vomiting.

=== Presyncope ===
Presyncope is a feeling of lightheadedness or simply feeling faint. Syncope, by contrast, is actually fainting. A circulatory system deficiency, such as low blood pressure, can contribute to a feeling of dizziness when one suddenly stands up.

== Diagnosis ==
The difficulty of making the right vestibular diagnosis is reflected in the fact that in some populations, more than one-third of the patients with a vestibular disease consult more than one physician – in some cases up to more than fifteen.

== Treatment ==
There are various options for treating balance disorders. One treatment option involves addressing an underlying disease or disorder contributing to the balance problem, such as ear infection, stroke, multiple sclerosis, spinal cord injury, Parkinson's, neuromuscular conditions, acquired brain injury, cerebellar dysfunctions and/or ataxia, or some tumors, such as acoustic neuroma.

Individual treatment varies based on assessment results including symptoms, medical history, general health, and the results of medical tests. Additionally, tai chi may be a cost-effective method to prevent falls in the elderly.

=== Vestibular rehabilitation ===
Many types of balance disorders will require balance training, prescribed by an occupational therapist or physiotherapist. Physiotherapists often administer standardized outcome measures as part of their assessment in order to gain useful information and data about a patient's current status. Some standardized balance assessments or outcome measures include but are not limited to the Functional Reach Test, Clinical Test for Sensory Integration in Balance (CTSIB), Berg Balance Scale and/or Timed Up and Go The data and information collected can further help the physiotherapist develop an intervention program that is specific to the individual assessed. Intervention programs may include training activities that can be used to improve static and dynamic postural control, body alignment, weight distribution, ambulation, fall prevention and sensory function.

=== Bilateral vestibular loss ===
Dysequilibrium arising from bilateral loss of vestibular function – such as can occur from ototoxic drugs such as gentamicin – can also be treated with balance retraining exercises (vestibular rehabilitation) although the improvement is not likely to be full recovery.

== Research ==
Scientists at the National Institute on Deafness and Other Communication Disorders (NIDCD) are working to understand the various balance disorders and the complex interactions between the labyrinth, other balance-sensing organs, and the brain. NIDCD scientists are studying eye movement to understand the changes that occur in aging, disease, and injury, as well as collecting data about eye movement and posture to improve diagnosis and treatment of balance disorders. They are also studying the effectiveness of certain exercises as a treatment option. Recently, a study published in JAMA Otolaryngology-Head & Neck Surgery found that balance problems are an indicator of mortality potentially due to altered metabolism of vestibular system.

== See also ==
- Hypokinesia
- Tremor
- Huntington's disease
