= Force platform =

Measuring instrument

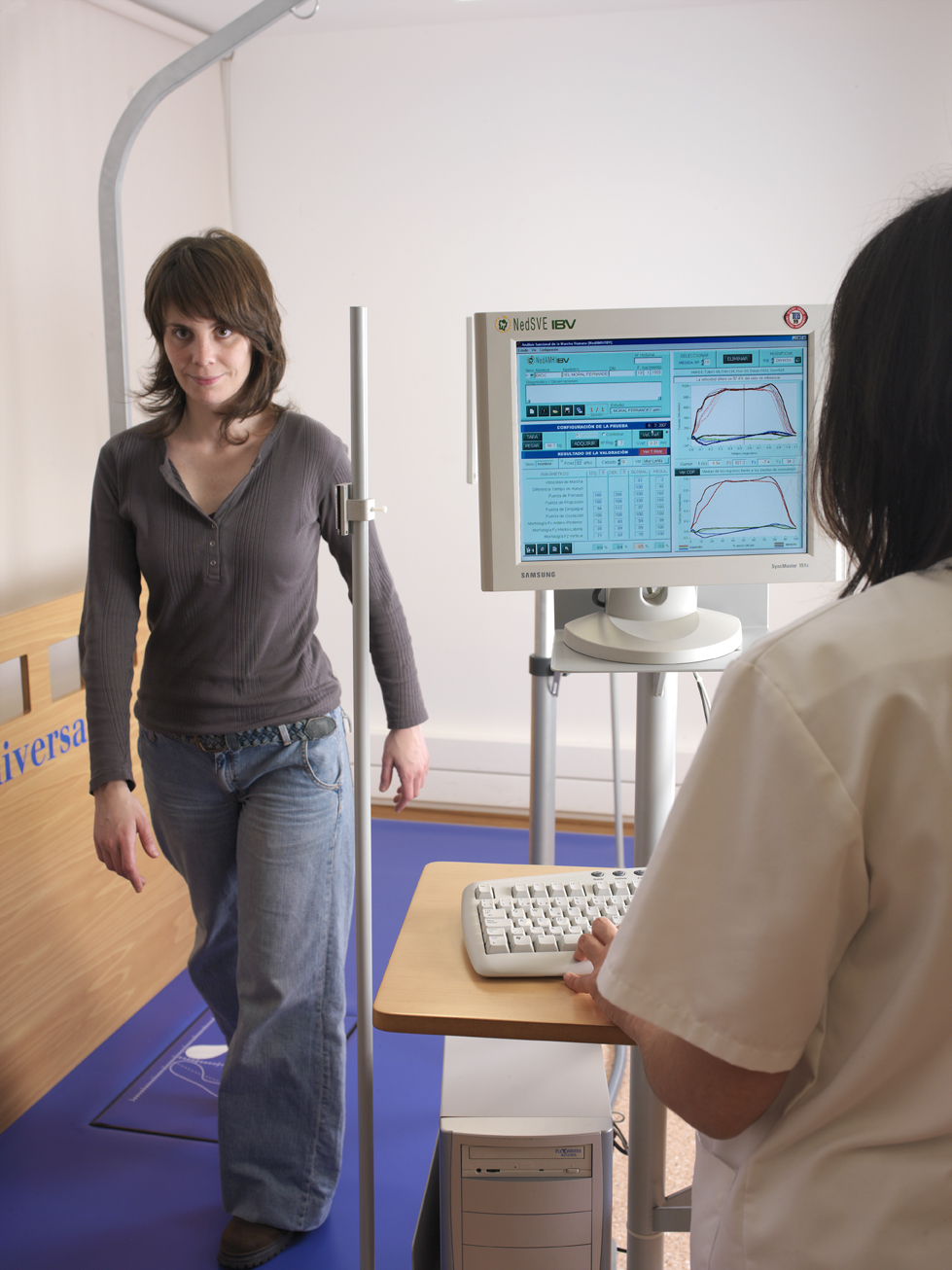
Woman walking on a force platform.

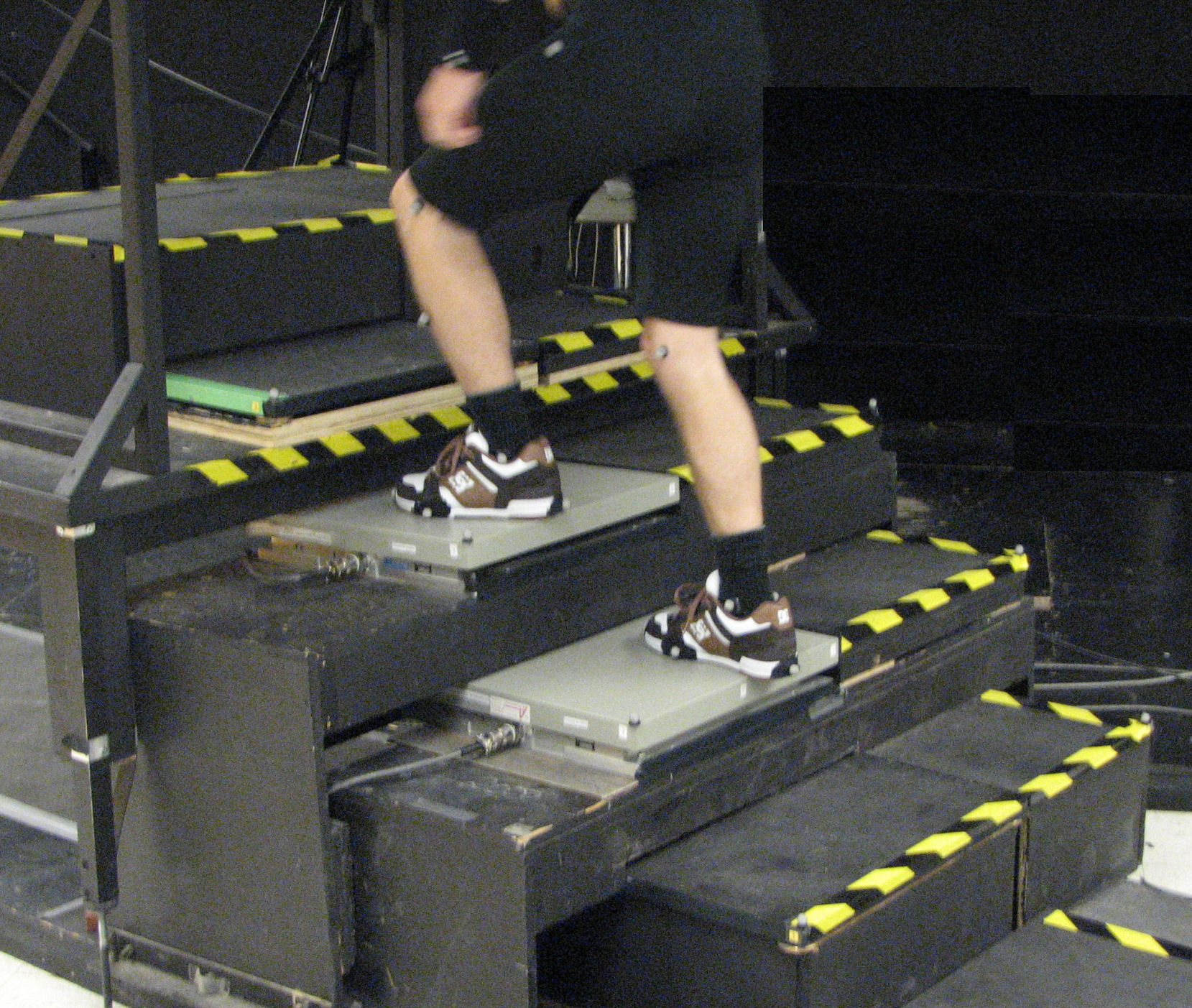
Stairway instrumented with two AMTI strain-gauged force platforms.

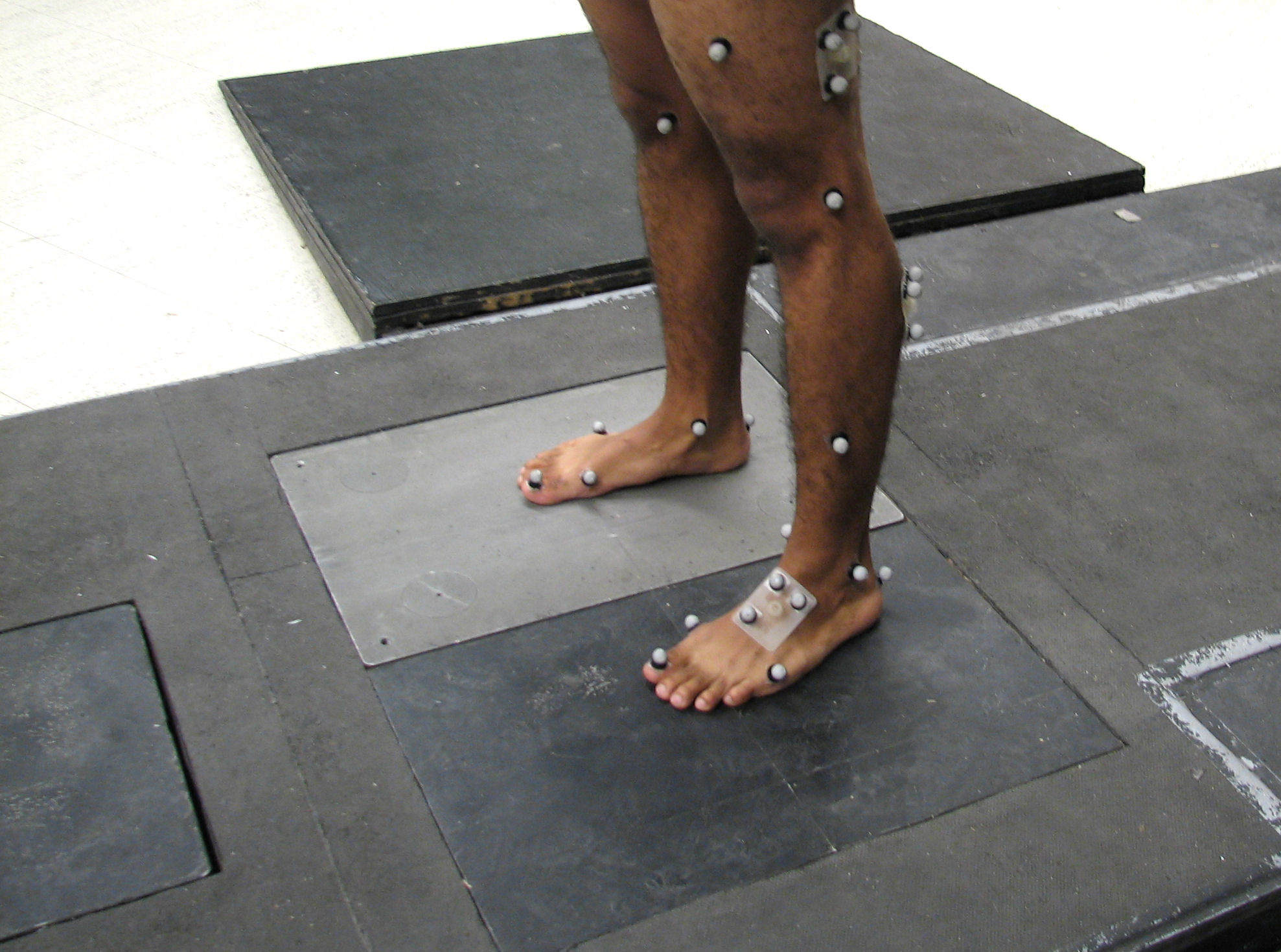
Laboratory walkway instrumented with three Kistler piezoelectric force platforms for posture and gait analysis.

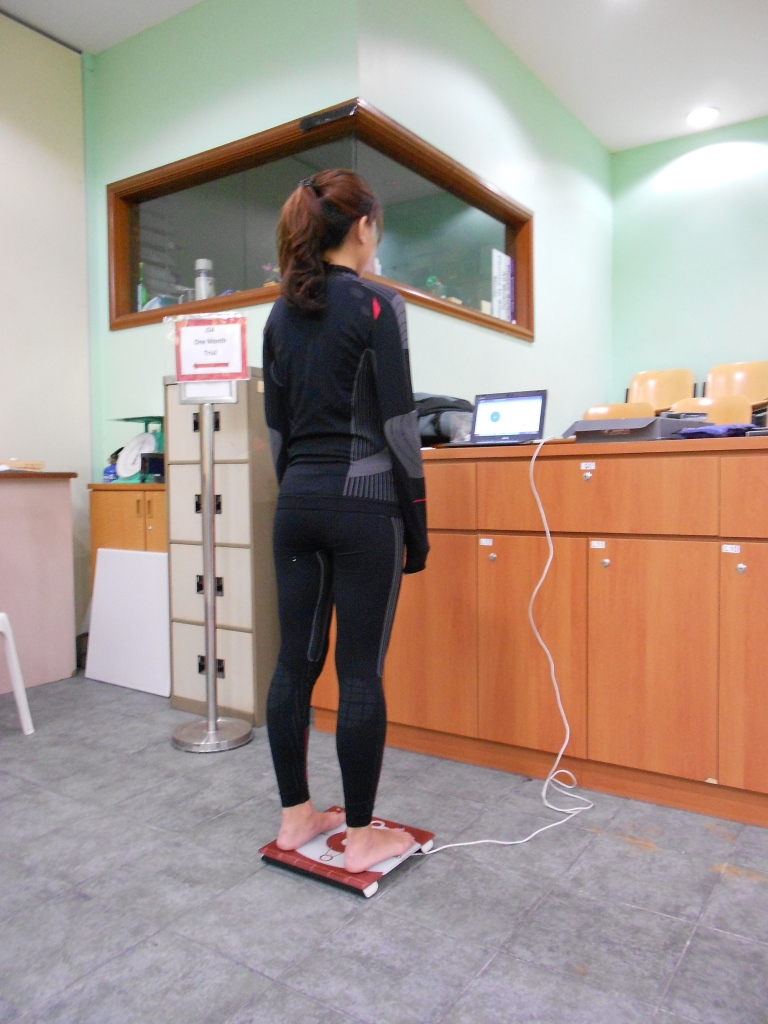
Stabilometric force platform in sport

Force platforms or force plates are measuring instruments that measure the ground reaction forces generated by a body standing on or moving across them, to quantify balance, gait and other parameters of biomechanics. Most common areas of application are medicine and sports.

== Operation ==
The simplest force platform is a plate with a single pedestal, instrumented as a load cell. Better designs have a pair of rectangular plates, although triangular can also work, one over another with load cells or triaxial force transducers between them at the corners.

Like single-force platforms, dual-force platforms can be used to assess performance in double leg tests and strength and power asymmetries in unilateral jump and isometric tests. However, they also provide an additional level of intelligence on neuromuscular status by evaluating the force distribution between limbs during double-limb tests, revealing critical information on strength asymmetries and compensatory strategies.

The simplest force plates measure only the vertical component of the force in the geometric center of the platform. More advanced models measure the three-dimensional components of the single equivalent force applied to the surface and its point of application, usually called the centre of pressure (CoP), as well as the vertical moment of force. Cylindrical force plates have also been constructed for studying arboreal locomotion, including brachiation.

Force platforms may be classified as single-pedestal or multi-pedestal and by the transducer (force and moment transducer) type: strain gauge, piezoelectric sensors, capacitance gauge, piezoresistive, etc., each with its advantages and drawbacks. Single pedestal models, sometimes called load cells, are suitable for forces that are applied over a small area. For studies of movements, such as gait analysis, force platforms with at least three pedestals and usually four are used to permit forces that migrate across the plate. For example, during walking ground reaction forces start at the heel and finish near the big toe.

Force platforms should be distinguished from pressure measuring systems that, although they too quantify centre of pressure, do not directly measure the applied force vector. Pressure measuring plates are useful for quantifying the pressure patterns under a foot over time but cannot quantify horizontal or shear components of the applied forces.

The measurements from a force platform can be either studied in isolation, or combined with other data, such as limb kinematics to understand the principles of locomotion. If an organism makes a standing jump from a force plate, the data from the plate alone is sufficient to calculate acceleration, work, power output, jump angle, and jump distance using basic physics. Simultaneous video measurements of leg joint angles and force plate output can allow the determination of torque, work and power at each joint using a method called inverse dynamics.

== Recent developments in technology ==
Advancements in technology have allowed force platforms to take on a new role within the kinetics field. Traditional laboratory-grade force plates cost (usually in the thousands) have made them very impractical for the everyday clinician. However, Nintendo introduced the Wii Balance Board (WBB) (Nintendo, Kyoto, Japan) in 2007 and changed the structure of what a force plate can be. By 2010, it was found that the WBB is a valid and reliable instrument to measure the weight distribution, when directly compared to the "gold-standard" laboratory-grade force plate, while costing less than $100. More so, this has been verified in both healthy and clinical populations. This is possible due to the four force transducers found in the corners of the WBB. These studies are conducted using customized software, such as LabVIEW (National Instruments, Austin, TX, USA) that can be integrated with the board to be able to measure the amount of body sway or the CoP path length during trials for time. The other benefit to having a posturography system, such as the WBB, is that it is portable so clinicians around the world are able to measure body sway quantitatively, instead of relying on the subjective, clinical balance assessments currently in use.

According to Digital Trends, Nintendo's Wii and the WiiU successor product have both been discontinued as of March 2016. This exemplifies one of the issues arising from the adoption of inexpensive off-the-shelf consumer products re-purposed for medical measurements. Further issues with such adoption arise from the regulatory and standards bodies around the world. Force platforms used for measuring a patient's balance and mobility performance are classified by the U.S. FDA (United States Food and Drug Administration) as Class I Medical Devices. As such they must be manufactured to certain quality standards as established by ISO (International Standards Organization)ISO 9001 Quality Management Principles or ISO 13485 Medical Device Quality Management Systems. The European Union's MDD (Medical Device Directive) also classifies force platforms used for medical measurements as Class I medical devices and require medical CE certification for importation and use in the European Union for such medical applications. A notable recent standard, ASTM F3109-16 Standard Test Method for Verification of Multi-Axis Force Measuring Platforms presents a framework for manufactures and users to verify the performance of Force platforms across the extents of their working surface. Standards such as these are used by manufactures of medical grade force platforms to ensure that measurements made on a patient population are accurate, repeatable and reliable. In short, inexpensive consumer grade entertainment components may be a poor choice for medical measurements given the lack of continuity of such products and their legal, regulatory and perhaps quality unsuitability for such applications.

== Use in sport ==
Force plates are commonly used in sport to access an athlete's force producing capabilities, strength and imbalance . A practitioner can use a force plate to assess training needs, readiness to train, and also during the return to play process.

Typical force plate assessments in sport include the countermovement jump (CMJ), squat jump (SJ), drop jump (DJ), countermovement rebound jump, and isometric mid thigh pull (IMTP).

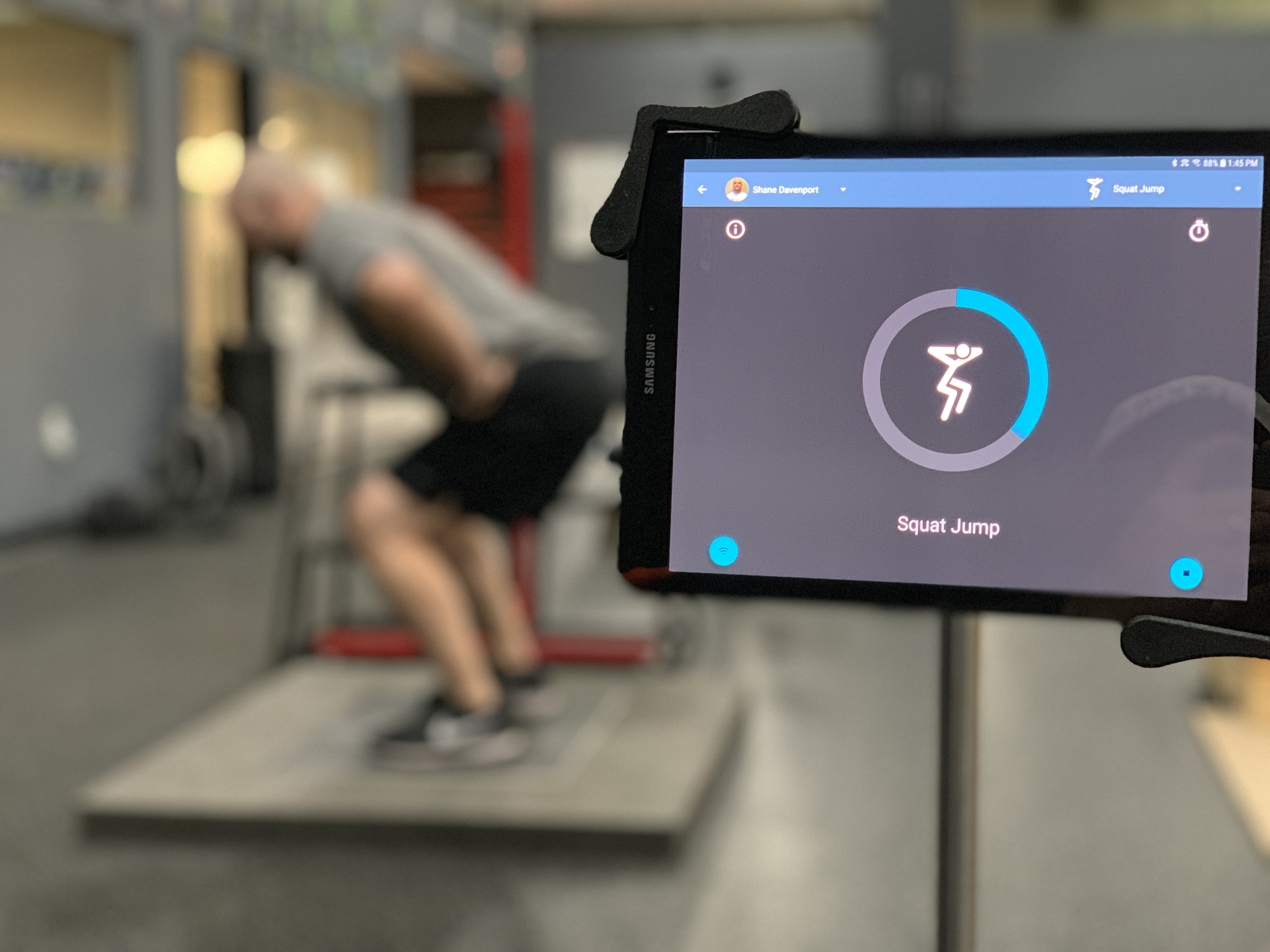
Hawkin Dynamics force plates in sport

Practitioners often have trouble understanding which metrics to track when using force plates. A leading biomechanist out of the University of Chichester has created a system for easily selecting force plate metrics. This system is called the 'ODSF System' by Dr. Jason Lake.

== History ==
Chronology

•1976• Advanced Mechanical Technology, Inc. (AMTI) constructed the first commercially available strain gauge force plate for gait analysis at the biomechanics laboratory of the Boston Children's Hospital.

•2017• Hawkin Dynamics created the first wireless force platform and mobile app.

== See also ==
- Gait analysis
- Posturography
