= Konstantina Stankovic =

American otolaryngologist

Konstantina Marka Stankovic
- Education: Massachusetts Institute of Technology; Harvard University
- Scientific career
- Fields: Head and neck surgery
- Workplaces: Harvard University; Stanford University
- Academic advisors: Felix Villars

Konstantina Marka Stankovic is an otolaryngologist and physician-scientist working as the Bertarelli Foundation Professor and Chair of Nanotechnology–Head and Neck Surgery at Stanford University School of Medicine since 2022.

== Life ==
Konstantina Marka Stanković was born to Marko and Danica Trboić. She has two brothers. She first moved to the United States as a high school exchange student. She earned a B.S. in biology and physics from Massachusetts Institute of Technology (MIT) in 1992. Earle L. Lomon and Felix Villars were her undergraduate physics advisors.

She completed a Ph.D. (1998) in speech and hearing bioscience and technology and M.D. (1999) from the Harvard–MIT Program in Health Sciences and Technology. Her dissertation was titled, Efferent Effects on Auditory-nerve Responses to Tones: Substantial Inhibition Even at High Sound Levels and Tail Frequencies. She completed a otorhinolaryngological residency at Harvard Medical School. She conducted a research fellowship in molecular neuroscience at the Howard Hughes Medical Institute and Boston Children's Hospital. She was a neurotological clinical fellow at the Harvard Medical School. She was an associate professor of otolaryngology at Harvard Medical School and director of the division otology and neurotology at Massachusetts Eye and Ear. She was president of the American Auditory Society in 2014.

In 2015, she was elected a member of the American Otological Society. In 2018, she was elected a member of the Collegium Oto-Rhino-Laryngologicum Amicitiae Sacrum. She became an honorary corresponding member of the Germany Society of Otorhinolaryngology Head and Neck Surgery in 2021. She is a Fellow of the American Neurotology Society and the American College of Surgeons. In 2022, she joined Stanford Health Care as the chair of the department of otolaryngology-head and neck surgery, succeeding Robert K. Jackler. Stankovic is the Bertarelli Foundation Professor and Chair of Otolaryngology–Head and Neck Surgery. She was elected a Member of the National Academy of Medicine in 2024.
