= Elaszym =

Elaszym may refer to one of two enzymes:

- Chymotrypsin-like elastases
- Neutrophil elastase
