= American Neurotology Society =

Medical society for ears, hearing, and balance

The American Neurotology Society is a medical society for neurotology, a subspecialty of otolaryngology which focuses on disorders of the ear, hearing and balance.

== History ==
Originally named the Neurotology Group in 1965, the group held their first meeting at the 70th Annual Meeting of the American Academy of Ophthalmology and Otolaryngology (which is now the American Academy of Otolaryngology-Head and Neck Surgery) at the Palmer House Hotel in Chicago. The increasing complexity of clinical hearing and vestibular tests and the otologist's role in interpreting and using these tests in patient care led to the inaugural panel on nystagmography. Fred Harbert, MD serving as the first president from 1965-1969.

Initial scientific programs in the late 1960s consisted of presentations on diagnostic approaches to hearing loss and vertigo with audiometry and nystagmography. In the 1970s, the genetics of hearing loss and clinical applications of evoked auditory response were introduced. In 1974, the organization was renamed the American Neurotology Society (ANS).

In April 1989, the ANS became full member of the Combined Otolaryngology Spring Meetings (COSM). Today, the ANS educational program has been a consistent anchor for the Combined Otolaryngologic Society Meeting in the spring and the American Academy of Otolaryngology–Head and Neck Surgery meeting in the fall.

Together with the American Otological Society (AOS), the executive committee of the ANS developed the training requirements and standards for training in neurotology. The first ACGME accreditation of neurotology subspecialty training was in 1997.

== Membership and Mission ==
The ANS is composed of physicians and audiologists devoted to neurotology and otology, focusing on sensorineural hearing and balance systems. The mission statement of the ANS emphasizes improving public health care related to disorders of the ear, hearing and balance, primarily via continuing medical education (CME).

== Official Journal ==
The official journal, Otology & Neurotology, is also affiliated with the American Otological Society, the European Academy of Otology & Neurotology, the Politzer Society, the Japan Otological Society, and ADANO.
