= Vestibular rehabilitation =

Form of physical therapy for vestibular disorders

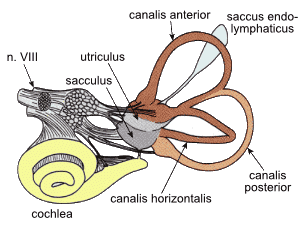
Diagram of the vestibular system, the structures whose dysfunction can benefit from vestibular rehabilitation

Vestibular rehabilitation (VR), also known as vestibular rehabilitation therapy (VRT), is a specialized form of physical therapy used to treat vestibular disorders or symptoms, characterized by dizziness, vertigo, imbalance, posture, and vision. These primary symptoms can result in secondary symptoms such as nausea, fatigue, and difficulty concentrating. Symptoms of vestibular dysfunction can significantly decrease quality of life, introducing mental-emotional issues such as anxiety and depression, and greatly impair an individual, causing them to become more sedentary. Decreased mobility can result in weaker muscles, less flexible joints, and worsened stamina, as well as decreased social and occupational activity. Vestibular rehabilitation therapy can be used in conjunction with cognitive behavioral therapy in order to reduce anxiety and depression resulting from a change in lifestyle.

== Vestibular disorders ==
The term "vestibular" refers to the inner ear system with its fluid-filled canals that allow for balance and spatial orientation. Some common vestibular disorders include vestibular neuritis, Ménière's disease, and nerve compression. Vestibular dysfunction can exist unilaterally, affecting only one side of the body, or bilaterally, affecting both sides.

The most commonly known vestibular disorder is called Benign Paroxysmal Positional Vertigo (BPPV). The BPPV is characterized by a temporary dizzy feeling associated with blurred vision in relation to certain head positions. BPPV may affect anterior, posterior or horizontal vestibular canals. The posterior canal was reported in the literature as the most commonly affected canal, occurring in 80% of patients diagnosed with BPPV. Several positional tests such as Dix-Hallpike, supine roll test, and head shaking nystagmus test may indicate which canal is affected by BPPV.

Vestibular damage is often irreparable and symptoms are persistent. Although the body naturally compensates for vestibular dysfunction (as it does for the dysfunction or deficiency of any sense), vestibular rehabilitation furthers the compensation process to decrease both primary and secondary symptoms. In cases of chronic vestibular dysfunction, medication in the form of vestibular suppressants does not allow the nervous system to undergo compensation. Thus, long-term medication is not a viable option for individuals with chronic vestibular dysfunction. Because of this, vestibular rehabilitation therapy is a better alternative for long-term vestibular dysfunction. However, some medications, such as anticholinergics, antihistamines, and benzodiazepines, are useful in acute cases (of 5 days or less) for reducing nausea and other secondary symptoms.

== Diagnostic tests ==
Because the methods of vestibular rehabilitation therapy differ for different disorders, the form of vestibular dysfunction, ability level, and history of symptoms, each patient must be carefully assessed in order to diagnose vestibular dysfunction and to choose the correct exercises for treatment.Vestibular physiotherapy entails precise maneuvers and sports designed to deal with inner ear dysfunctions and retrain the brain for better functionality, aiming to enhance stability and alleviate dizziness. These repositioning maneuvers are particularly effective for treating benign paroxysmal positional vertigo (BPPV), a normal vestibular condition. In some cases, vestibular rehabilitation may not be the appropriate treatment at all. Vestibular disorders can be diagnosed using several different kinds of assessments, some of which include examination of an individual's ability to maintain posture, balance, and head position. Some diagnostic tests are more easily performed in a clinical setting than others but relay less specific information to the tester, and vice versa. A proper history of symptoms should include what those symptoms are, how often they occur, and under what circumstances, including whether the symptoms are triggered or spontaneous. Other conditions that can be treated with vestibular rehabilitation therapy are symptoms of concussions and dizziness in patients with multiple sclerosis. Magnetic resonance imaging techniques can be used as diagnostic tools to determine the presence of issues that can be treated with vestibular rehabilitation, regardless of whether they are vestibular in nature.

=== Caloric reflex test ===
The caloric reflex test is designed to test the function of the vestibular system and can determine the cause of vestibular symptoms. The reflex test consists of pouring water into the external auditory canal of a patient and observing nystagmus, or involuntary eye movement. With normal vestibular function, the temperature of the water has an effect on the direction of eye movement. In individuals with peripheral unilateral vestibular hypofunction, nystagmus is absent.

=== Rotational chair testing ===
This test is used to test bilateral vestibular hypofunction and the degree of central nervous system (CNS) compensating those results. Movement of fluid within the inner ear, known as endolymph, is responsible for the relationship between eye movement and head velocity. The test consists of seating a patient in a rotating chair, rotating the chair to specific velocity, and observing eye movement. In individuals with normal vestibular function, the velocity of eye movement should be equal and opposite that of head movement. Lower rotational velocities are used to assess extent of CNS compensation.

=== Visual perception testing ===
Visual perception testing can assess a patient's ability to determine vertically- and horizontally-oriented objects, but with a limited degree of specificity. When asked to align a bar to horizontal or vertical, an individual with normal vestibular function can align the bar within 2.5 degrees of horizontal or vertical. An inability to do so indicates vestibular dysfunction. In some cases, the direction of tilt away from the desired orientation is on the same side as the dysfunction, while in some cases the opposite is true.

=== Posturography ===
Using various technologies to assess a person's ability to maintain posture and balance, different patterns of posturography can be determined. Once a pattern is determined, the modalities and inputs that the person relies on to maintain balance can be inferred. Knowing which systems and structures influence a person's stance can suggest different areas of dysfunction and preference.

=== Non-vestibular dizziness ===
In some cases, the results of vestibular tests are normal, yet the patient experiences vestibular symptoms, especially balance issues and dangerous falls. Some diagnoses that result in non-vestibular dizziness are concussions, Parkinson's disease, cerebellar ataxia, normal-pressure hydrocephalus, leukoaraiosis, progressive supranuclear palsy, and large-fiber peripheral neuropathy. There are also several disorders known as chronic situation-related dizziness disorders. For example, phobic postural vertigo (PPV) occurs when an individual with obsessive-compulsive characteristics experiences a sense of imbalance, despite the absence of balance issues. Chronic subjective dizziness (CSD) is a similar condition characterized by persistent vertigo, hypersensitivity to motion stimuli, and difficulty with precise visual tasks. Both phobic postural vertigo and chronic subjective dizziness may be treated with vestibular rehabilitation therapy or other therapeutic methods such as cognitive behavioral therapy and conditioning.

Persistent postural-perceptual dizziness (PPPD) is a chronic functional vestibular disorder characterized by constant dizziness, postural instability, and visual hypersensitivity. Even though standard vestibular tests often appear normal in these patients, evidence has shown the symptoms patients feel are abated by specific and specialized intervention. A 2025 systematic review and meta-analysis of six clinical trials involving 323 participants found that VPT significantly improves patient outcomes.

The research shows that specific rehabilitation strategies such as gaze stabilization, habituation exercises, and static or dynamic balance training, resulted in a "moderate to large" reduction in Dizziness Handicap Inventory (DHI) scores. These exercises work by retraining the brain to process sensory information more effectively, reducing the over-reliance on vision that often causes symptoms in PPPD patients. The study highlights that while VPT is a cornerstone to manage PPPD, it is most effective when the intervention is personalized to the patient's specific triggers and combined with multidisciplinary care like cognitive behavioral therapy, showing how DVT should be a primary recommendation for restoring functional independence in the PPPD population. Since physical therapists can be specialized in movement analysis and sensory retraining to help with people who have PPPD, they can play a vital role in diagnosing certain functional patterns and guiding patients through interventions necessary for long-term recovery and improved quality of life. However, more research is needed due to the limited availability of high-quality randomized control trials and the variability in treatment for each individual.

== Rehabilitation exercises ==
Vestibular rehabilitation is specific to the dysfunction that a patient experiences. Some treatment methods seek to eliminate the cause of vestibular dysfunction, while others allow the brain to compensate for dysfunction without targeting the source. The former goal is for treating benign paroxysmal positional vertigo, while the latter treats vestibular hypofunction, which cannot be cured. The treatment process should begin as early as possible, to decrease fall risk. The patient should start slowly, gradually increasing the intensity and duration of exercises, and be accompanied by an accessible and reassuring therapist, as discomfort and negative emotional states can negatively affect treatment.

=== Treatment of benign paroxysmal positional vertigo ===
Treatment of benign paroxysmal positional vertigo (BPPV) depends on the canals involved (horizontal or vertical) and which form of BPPV the patient is experiencing (canalithiasis versus cupulolithiasis). Canalithiasis is characterized by a dislodged otolith particle, called otoconia, that floats in the fluid in one of the three vestibular canals and cause the feeling of dizziness with vision disturbances. On the other hand, cupulolithiasis is another form of BPPV caused by an attachment of otolith particle in the cupula (the base of semicircular canal) of the involved canal.

Vestibular dysfunction and damage is usually irreparable and persistent. When an individual with chronic vestibular dysfunction uses medication such as vestibular suppressants, the suppressant blocks the nervous system from undergoing compensation. This is why in this case, vestibular rehabilitation is a better option.

==== Canalith repositioning treatments ====
Canalith repositioning treatments (CRT) aim to move debris in the inner ear out of the semicircular canal in order to treat benign paroxysmal positional vertigo. CRT has 5 key elements:

1. Premedication of the patient
2. Specific positions
3. Timing of shifts between positions
4. Use of vibration
5. Post-maneuver instructions

Early attempts to treat BPPV involved similar processes that were believed to be habituation exercises, but more likely dislodged and dissolved debris.

=== Treatment of vestibular hypofunction ===
Vestibular hypofunction can be a unilateral or bilateral vestibular loss. There are three types of vestibular rehabilitation exercises to reduce symptoms in cases where physical dysfunction cannot be reduced. The category of exercises chosen by a vestibular therapist depends on the problems reported by the patient. The following exercises can be used to treat dizziness with fast movements or exposure to intense visual stimuli, difficulty seeing (appearance of bouncing or jumping visual field) with head movement, and trouble with balance.

==== Habituation ====
Habituation exercise aims to repeatedly expose patients to stimuli that provoke dizziness, such as certain motions and harsh visual stimuli. The provoking stimulus will induce dizziness at first, but with continued habituation exercises, the brain can adapt to discount the stimulus and dizziness will reduce. As this occurs, the exercises can increase in intensity. The patient should take breaks between exercises when symptoms are experienced, until they stop.

==== Gaze stabilization ====
Gaze stabilization exercises aim to increase visual ability during head movement. The goal of the patient during these exercises is to maintain the gaze during head movement. One kind of gaze stabilization exercise involves looking at a target and moving the head back and forth, without looking away from the target. Another exercise requires looking from one target to another, first without moving the head, and then moving the head to be aligned with the target without shifting the eyes. The last exercise for gaze stabilization is known as the remembered-target exercise and is performed partially with the eyes closed. First, the patient looks at a target object directly in front of them. Next, the patient closes their eyes and turns their head and turns it back. When the patient opens their eyes, they should still be looking at the target object.

==== Balance training ====
Balance-training exercises (also known as postural-stabilization exercises) are designed to improve a patient's ability to stay upright, and reduce the likelihood of dangerous falls. Balance-training exercises can be done walking or standing and can incorporate head movements and habituation exercises to limit exacerbation of symptoms. Increased postural stability can be achieved using visual and somatosensory cues. Thus, exercises in this category challenge the body's use of these cues by limiting or changing them. For example, having the patient close their eyes limits their ability to rely on visual cues to maintain postural stability, while having the patient stand on foam alters their reliance on somatosensory signals.

== Effectiveness ==
The limitations of vestibular rehabilitation therapy are the overall health and function of the nervous system, especially the brainstem, cerebellum, and visual and somatosensory centers. The ultimate goal of vestibular rehabilitation therapy is the reduction of vertigo, dizziness, gaze instability, poor balance, and dangerous falls; in some cases this goal is achieved without reducing dysfunction.

Many factors can affect the outcome of vestibular therapy including but not limited to age, gender, environmental factors, medical history as well as other facets of the patient's daily life. A major factor that can impede progress during vestibular therapy is altered mental status, such as depression, anxiety or even fear. A patient's fear of falling or even moving can negatively impact the effectiveness of the treatment. Another major factor is other medical conditions the patient may have in addition to the vestibular disorder, if they also have a musculoskeletal disorder they may not be able to perform all the movements required during the treatment session, negatively affecting the outcome. Other factors that determine the effectiveness of vestibular rehabilitation are behavioral ones, such as patient compliance to home exercises and limitations in daily life; the severity of the disorder (including unilateral versus bilateral dysfunction); and other medical conditions and medications. Those comorbidities may also require the patient to take medications that may have adverse side effects that may also impact the vestibular rehab so it is very important for the patient to check with their doctor as well as their vestibular therapist before starting or stopping any medication. A factor that can positively affect the outcome is starting the therapy as soon as possible, one study found that early intervention in patients with unilateral peripheral disorders correlated to a significantly lower Dizziness Handicap Inventory (DHI) score. Research has shown that, overall, 80 to 85 percent of patients with chronic vestibular disability reported a reduction in symptoms after VR.

More recently, higher-level evidence has further clarified the effectiveness and recommended application of vestibular rehabilitation therapy. A 2022 updated clinical practice guideline from the American Physical Therapy Association's Academy of Neurologic Physical Therapy provides strong evidence supporting vestibular rehabilitation therapy for adults with acute, subacute, and chronic unilateral and bilateral peripheral vestibular hypofunction. The guideline reports consistent improvements in dizziness, gaze stability, balance, postural control, and functional outcomes.

The guideline also provides evidence-based dosing recommendations, suggesting supervised vestibular rehabilitation with gaze stabilization exercises performed three to five times daily for a total of 12–40 minutes per day depending on whether dysfunction is acute, chronic, unilateral, or bilateral. These recommendations apply specifically to peripheral vestibular hypofunction confirmed by objective vestibular testing and do not extend to central vestibular disorders.

There is evidence that vestibular rehabilitation therapy increases the "balance, quality of life, and functional capacity" of patients with multiple sclerosis.

In a study of 109 children, an association between completion of vestibular rehabilitation and improvement of concussion symptoms and visuovestibular performance was found. A different study found that vestibular and physical therapy were linked to a shorter recovery period, resulting in a more rapid return to sports. A 2018 meta-analysis utilized the DHI to evaluate the effects of vestibular therapy on the alleviation of concussion symptoms. The DHI is a 25-item questionnaire that is a cost-effective and simple tool that has the ability to analyze the effects of vestibular therapy on concussion symptoms. The lower the DHI, the less symptomatic a patient is and a decrease of 18 points or more from pre to post vestibular therapy intervention is considered clinically significant. All of the studies evaluated in the meta-analysis had clinically significant changes in DHI pre to post vestibular therapy, illustrating the positive effects of vestibular therapy on the treatment and alleviation of concussion symptoms.

== Training and certification ==
Vestibular rehabilitation can be facilitated by a medical professional who specializes in neurology or vestibular disorders. An official specialist certification is not required, and in many places, is not offered. The leading association of physical therapists in each country determines what disciplines have specialization status and the requirements of an individual to obtain certification in a speciality.

=== In the US ===
Members of the American Physical Therapy Association (APTA) who undergo specialist certification in neurology via the American Board of Physical Therapy Specialties (ABPTS) can administer vestibular rehabilitation exercises. While APTA does not offer official certification in vestibular rehabilitation, it does offer courses regarding vestibular rehabilitation at introductory and advanced levels. The Academy of Neurologic Physical Therapy and the Vestibular Rehabilitation Special Interest Group are working to have the APTA establish VR as an official specialty offered by the ABPTS.

The American Musculoskeletal Institute (AMSI) offers a 3-day course that results in a therapist being designated a Certified Vestibular Rehabilitation Specialist (Cert. VRS).

Members of the American Occupational Therapy Association (AOTA) who obtain specialty certification in low-vision rehabilitation are equipped to treat vision issues that arise from vestibular dysfunction or disorders.

=== In Canada ===
The Canadian Physiotherapy Association offers vestibular rehabilitation therapy courses, but does not recognize vestibular rehabilitation as a specialist certification. Similar to the ABPTS, the CPA's Clinical Specialty Program allows Canadian physiotherapists to specialize in neurosciences. Physical therapists with this specialization may be more equipped to administer vestibular treatment than those without it.

== See also ==
- Physical therapy
- Vestibular system
