= Pauli–Villars regularization =

Regularization technique in quantum field theory

In theoretical physics, Pauli–Villars regularization (P–V) is a procedure that isolates divergent terms from finite parts in loop calculations in field theory in order to renormalize the theory. Wolfgang Pauli and Felix Villars published the method in 1949, based on earlier work by Richard Feynman, Ernst Stueckelberg and Dominique Rivier.

In this treatment, a divergence arising from a loop integral (such as vacuum polarization or electron self-energy) is modulated by a spectrum of auxiliary particles added to the Lagrangian or propagator. When the masses of the fictitious particles are taken as an infinite limit (i.e., once the regulator is removed) one expects to recover the original theory.

This regulator is gauge invariant in an abelian theory due to the auxiliary particles being minimally coupled to the photon field through the gauge covariant derivative. It is not gauge covariant in a non-abelian theory, though, so Pauli–Villars regularization is more difficult to use in QCD calculations. P–V serves as a helpful alternative to the more commonly used dimensional regularization in specific circumstances, such as in chiral phenomena, where a change of dimension alters the properties of the Dirac gamma matrices.

Gerard 't Hooft and Martinus J. G. Veltman invented, in addition to dimensional regularization, the method of unitary regulators, which is a Lagrangian-based Pauli–Villars method with a discrete spectrum of auxiliary masses, using the path-integral formalism.

== Examples ==
Pauli–Villars regularization consists of introducing a fictitious mass term. For example, we would replace a photon propagator $\frac{1}{k^2 + i \epsilon}$, by $\frac{1}{k^2 + i \epsilon} - \frac{1}{k^2 - \Lambda^2+ i \epsilon}$, where $\Lambda$ can be thought of as the mass of a fictitious heavy photon, whose contribution is subtracted from that of an ordinary photon.

== See also ==
- Dimensional regularization
- BRST quantization
- Ghosts (physics)
- Regularization (physics)
