= Agostini's reaction =

- Purpose: test for the presence of glucose in urine

Agostini's reaction is a simple medical test for the presence of glucose in urine.

The method consists of adding the urine to a prepared solution of auric chloride and potassium oxide. If there is glucose present, the solution becomes red.

== Chemical mechanism ==
The diagnostic color change relies on the chemical reduction of gold ions by reducing sugars under alkaline conditions. When urine containing glucose is introduced to the alkaline solution, the glucose acts as a reducing agent. It undergoes oxidation to form gluconic acid. Concurrently, the gold(III) complex ions, specifically from the auric chloride precursor, are reduced to a metallic gold form. This process triggers the nucleation and subsequent growth of colloidal gold nanoparticles, which scatter light and impart the characteristic deep red or violet coloration to the solution.

== Clinical significance and limitations ==
Historically, Agostini's reaction served as a qualitative screening tool for glycosuria (the presence of reducing sugars in urine), which is a common clinical indicator of untreated or poorly managed diabetes mellitus. In a healthy individual, the renal tubules fully reabsorb glucose back into the bloodstream, leaving the urine virtually sugar-free. However, when blood sugar levels surpass the kidneys' threshold, excess glucose spills into the urine.

While simple, the Agostini reaction has been entirely superseded in modern medicine by more advanced urinalysis methods. Contemporary diagnostic protocols favor specialized dipstick strips that employ a highly specific, coupled enzymatic method featuring glucose oxidase and peroxidase. Unlike historical gold reuction assays, modern enzymatic strips avoid false-positive interactions caused by other urine-borne reducing agents or common drug interferences.

== See also ==
- List of medical tests
