= Felix Villars =

American physicist (1921–2002)

- Born: 6 January 1921; Biel, Switzerland
- Died: 27 April 2002 (aged 81); Belmont, Massachusetts
- Education: ETH Zurich
- Known for: Pauli–Villars regularization
- Spouse: Jacqueline Dubois
- Scientific career
- Workplaces: ETH Zurich, Institute for Advanced Study, MIT
- Doctoral advisor: Gregor Wentzel
- Doctoral students: David Finkelstein; Frederick L. Scarf
- Other notable students: Konstantina M. Stankovic

Felix Villars (French: [vilaʁ]; 6 January 1921 – 27 April 2002) was a Swiss-born American emeritus professor of physics at MIT. He is best known for the Pauli–Villars regularization, an important principle in quantum field theory.

== Early life ==
Villars was born in Biel, Switzerland and served in the Swiss Army during the Second World War, working as a meteorologist. In 1945, he graduated from the Swiss Federal Institute of Technology with degrees in physics and mathematics. His undergraduate thesis earned him the institute's Kern Medal for Excellence. The following year, Villars earned his doctorate in physics from the same institution.

From 1946 to 1949, Villars worked as a research assistant at the Swiss Federal Institute. While there, he collaborated with Wolfgang Pauli on work in quantum electrodynamics. They developed a method of dealing with mathematical singularities in quantum field theory, in order to extract finite physical results. This method, Pauli–Villars regularization, is used by physicists when working with field theory.

In 1949, Villars married the former Jacqueline Dubois and moved to the United States. He worked for a year at the Institute for Advanced Study in Princeton, New Jersey.

== MIT career ==
In 1950, Villars was hired as a research associate at MIT and eventually became a full professor in 1959. Along with Victor Weisskopf, he studied the scattering of radio waves owing to atmospheric turbulence. With Herman Feshbach, he studied the effect of the Earth's magnetic field on the ionosphere.

It was biology, however, that captured his imagination. Villars applied mathematical methods to studying the functioning of biological systems, yielding insights that had been missed by biologists and medical researchers who had been studying them for years.

Villars was a key figure in creating the Harvard-MIT Division of Health Sciences and Technology, a collaboration between Harvard University and MIT. Villars was also a visiting lecturer at Harvard Medical School. With MIT physics professor George B. Benedek, he wrote a three-volume undergraduate textbook, Physics with Illustrative Examples from Medicine and Biology.

Villars died of cancer at his home in Belmont, Massachusetts on 27 April 2002. He was 81.

== Books ==
- Villars, Felix; George B. Benedek (2000). Physics with Illustrative Examples from Medicine and Biology: Mechanics (second ed.). Springer Verlag. ISBN 0-387-98769-X.; 1st edition, 1973
- Villars, Felix; George B. Benedek (2006). Physics with Illustrative Examples from Medicine and Biology: Electricity and Magnetism (second ed.). Springer Verlag. ISBN 0-387-98770-3.
- Villars, Felix; George B. Benedek (2006). Physics with Illustrative Examples from Medicine and Biology: Statistical Physics (second ed.). Springer Verlag. ISBN 0-387-98952-8.
