= Center of pressure (terrestrial locomotion) =

In biomechanics, center of pressure (CoP) is the term given to the point of application of the ground reaction force vector. The ground reaction force vector represents the sum of all forces acting between a physical object and its supporting surface. Analysis of the center of pressure is common in studies on human postural control and gait. It is thought that changes in motor control may be reflected in changes in the center of pressure. In biomechanical studies, the effect of some experimental condition on movement execution will regularly be quantified by alterations in the center of pressure.

The center of pressure is not a static outcome measure. For instance, during human walking, the center of pressure is near the heel at the time of heelstrike and moves anteriorly throughout the step, being located near the toes at toe-off. For this reason, analysis of the center of pressure will need to take into account the dynamic nature of the signal. In the scientific literature various methods for the analysis of center of pressure time series have been proposed.

== Measuring CoP ==
CoP measurements are commonly gathered through the use of a force plate. A force plate gathers data in the anterior-posterior direction (forward and backward), the medial-lateral direction (side-to-side) and the vertical direction, as well as moments about all 3 axes. Together, these can be used to calculate the position of the center of pressure relative to the origin of the force plate.

== Relationship to balance ==
CoP and center of gravity (CoG) are both related to balance in that they are dependent on the position of the body with respect to the supporting surface. Center of gravity is subject to change based on posture. Center of pressure is the location on the supporting surface where the resultant vertical force vector would act if it could be considered to have a single point of application.

A shift of CoP is an indirect measure of postural sway and thus a measure of a person’s ability to maintain balance. People sway in the anterior-posterior direction (forward and backward) and the medial-lateral direction (side-to-side) when they are simply standing still. This comes as a result of small contractions of muscles in the body to maintain an upright position. An increase in sway is not necessarily an indicator of poorer balance so much as it is an indicator of decreased neuromuscular control, although it has been noted that postural sway is a precursor to a fall.
