= Limits of stability =

Limits of Stability (LoS) are a concept in balance and stability, defined as the points at which the center of gravity (CoG) approaches the limits of the base of support (BoS) and requires a corrective strategy to bring the center of mass (CoM) back within the BoS. LoS represents the maximum distance an individual can intentionally cover in any direction without losing balance or taking a step. The typical range of stable swaying is approximately 12.5° in the front-back (antero-posterior) direction and 16° in the side-to-side (medio-lateral) direction. This stable swaying area is often referred to as the 'Cone of Stability,' and the limits of the cone of stability vary depending on the specific task being performed.

When the CoG moves beyond the BoS, the individual must take a step or grasp an external support to maintain balance and prevent a fall.

These stability limits are perceived rather than physiological; they represent the subject's readiness to adjust their CoG position.

== Clinical significance ==
Limits of Stability (LoS) is a reliable variable in assessing stability and voluntary motor control in dynamic states. LoS helps assess balance in the dynamic state by instantaneously tracking the change in COM velocity and COM position.. It measures postural instability while screening for individuals who are at a higher risk of falling

A restricted LoS significantly influences an individual's ability to react to perturbations in balance control testing. This reduction in LoS may be because of weakness of the ankle and foot muscles, musculoskeletal problems of the lower limb, and/or an internal perception of the subject to resist larger displacements. These impairments can be correlated with medical examination findings and can be used as an outcome measure for rehabilitation of specific underlying body impairments.

From a clinical perspective, individuals who perform complex mobility tasks can function without support and are better able to tolerate environmental challenges.

== Possible causes of LoS impairment ==
1. Impaired cognitive processing: This is often associated with aging and can result in attention deficits.
2. Neuromuscular impairments: Conditions such as bradykinesia (slowness of movement), ataxia (lack of muscle coordination), and poor motor control
3. Musculoskeletal impairments: Weakness, limited range of motion (ROM), and pain in the musculoskeletal system
4. Emotional Overlay: Emotions like fear or anxiety
5. Aphysiology (exaggeration or poor effort)

== Limits of Stability testing ==
Various tools such as the Functional Reach Test (FRT) and Limits Of Stability (LOS) test have been used to assess LoS.

1. Functional Reach Test (FRT): This test is conventionally used to assess balance and LoS in the forward direction. It is cost-effective and easy to administer. However, it only measures LoS in the forward direction and is performed in a standing posture with the feet in a static position.
2. Limits Of Stability (LOS) Test: This is a more advanced tool compared to FRT and is used to measure balance under multi-directional conditions. In this test, the subject stands on force plates and intentionally shifts their body weight in the cued direction.

=== Parameters measured in LOS test ===
1. Reaction Time (RT): The time taken by an individual to start shifting their center of gravity (COG) from the static position after receiving a cue, measured in seconds.
2. Movement Velocity (MVL): The average speed at which the COG shifts.
3. EndPoint Excursions (EPE): The distance willingly covered by the subject in their very first attempt towards the target, expressed as a percentage.
4. Maximum Excursions (MXE): The amount of distance the subject actually covered or moved their COG.
5. Directional Control (DCL): A comparison between the amount of movement demonstrated in the desired direction (towards the target) to the amount of external movement in the opposite direction of the target, expressed as a percentage.

=== Interpretation of LOS Results ===
The ability to move around without falling is necessary for performing activities of daily living (ADLs). Patients who exhibit delays in reaction time, decreased movement velocity, restricted Limits of Stability (LoS) boundary or cone of stability, or uncontrolled center of gravity (CoG) movement are at a higher risk of falling. A delayed reaction time may indicate cognitive processing issues, while reduced movement velocities may indicate higher-level central nervous system deficits. Reduced endpoint excursions, excessively larger maximum excursions, and poor directional control are all indicative of motor control abnormalities.

A LoS score close to 100 represents no sway and hence a reduced risk of falling, while scores close to 0 imply a higher risk of falling.

=== Validity and reliability of LOS ===
The LOS test has been validated for use in community-dwelling elderly individuals, those with neurological disorders, and those with back and knee injuries. A study conducted by Wernick-Robinson and collaborators in 1999 on the test-retest reliability suggests that using the amount of distance covered in the functional reach test alone may not be an adequate measure of dynamic balance. The study also highlights that for a better evaluation of postural control, additional assessment of movement strategies is indispensable.

Another study conducted by Brouwer et al. claims that Limits of Stability are a reliable measure for balance testing in healthy populations.

== Functional Impact and Implications of LOS ==
The capability of moving around without falling is necessary for activities of daily living (ADLs).Instability during weight-shifting activities or the inability to perform certain weight transfer tasks, such as bending forward to take objects from a shelf or leaning backward to rinse hair in the shower, can result from a restricted LoS boundary

The LoS can be indicative of fall risks in various populations, including the elderly, individuals with movement disorders, and those with neurological impairments. The ability to voluntarily move the COG to positions within the Limits of Stability (LOS) with control is fundamental to independence and safety in mobility tasks, such as reaching for objects, transitioning from seated to standing positions (or standing to seated), and walking.
