= Balance (ability) =

Ability to maintain the line of gravity of a body

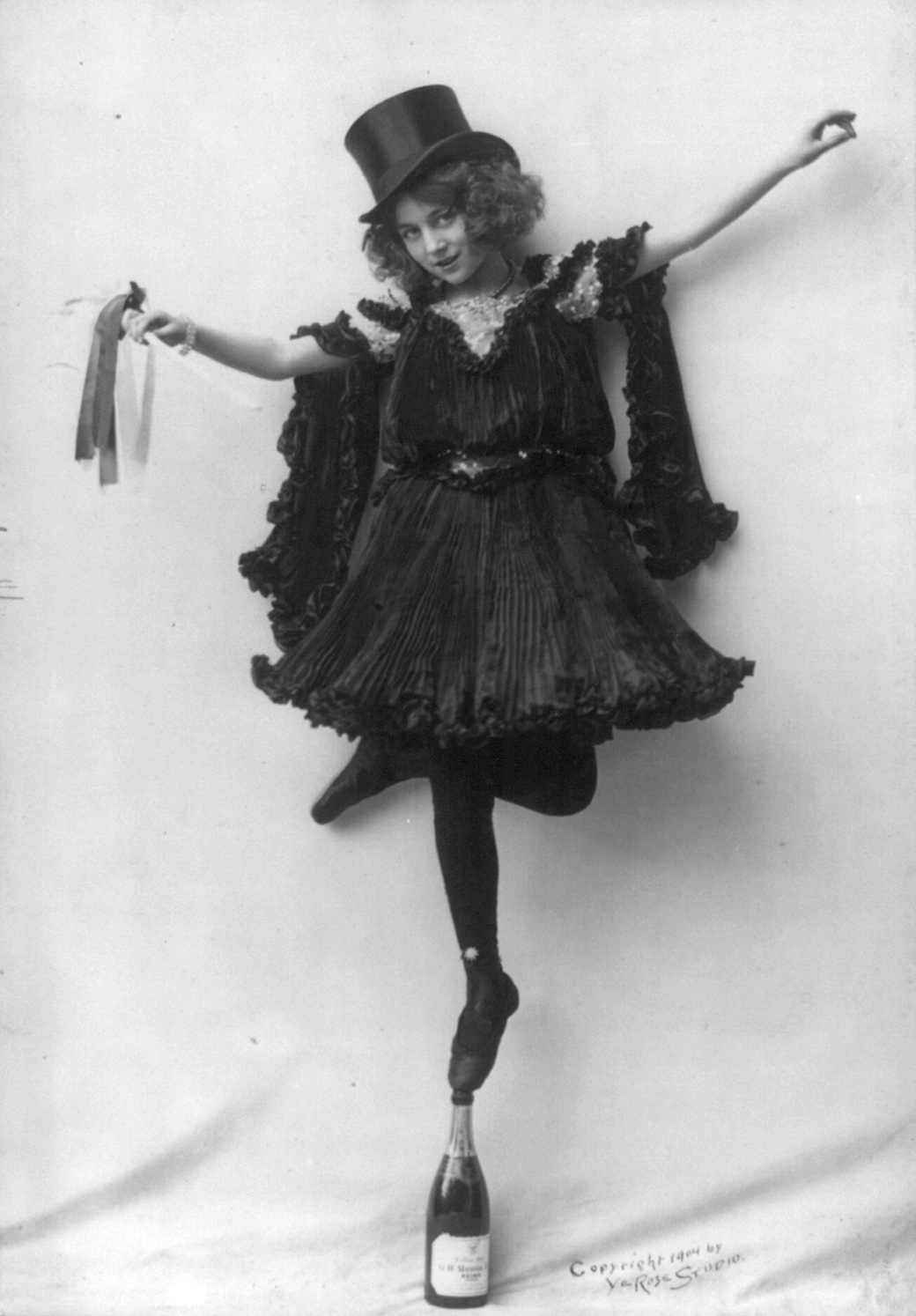
A woman demonstrating the ability to balance

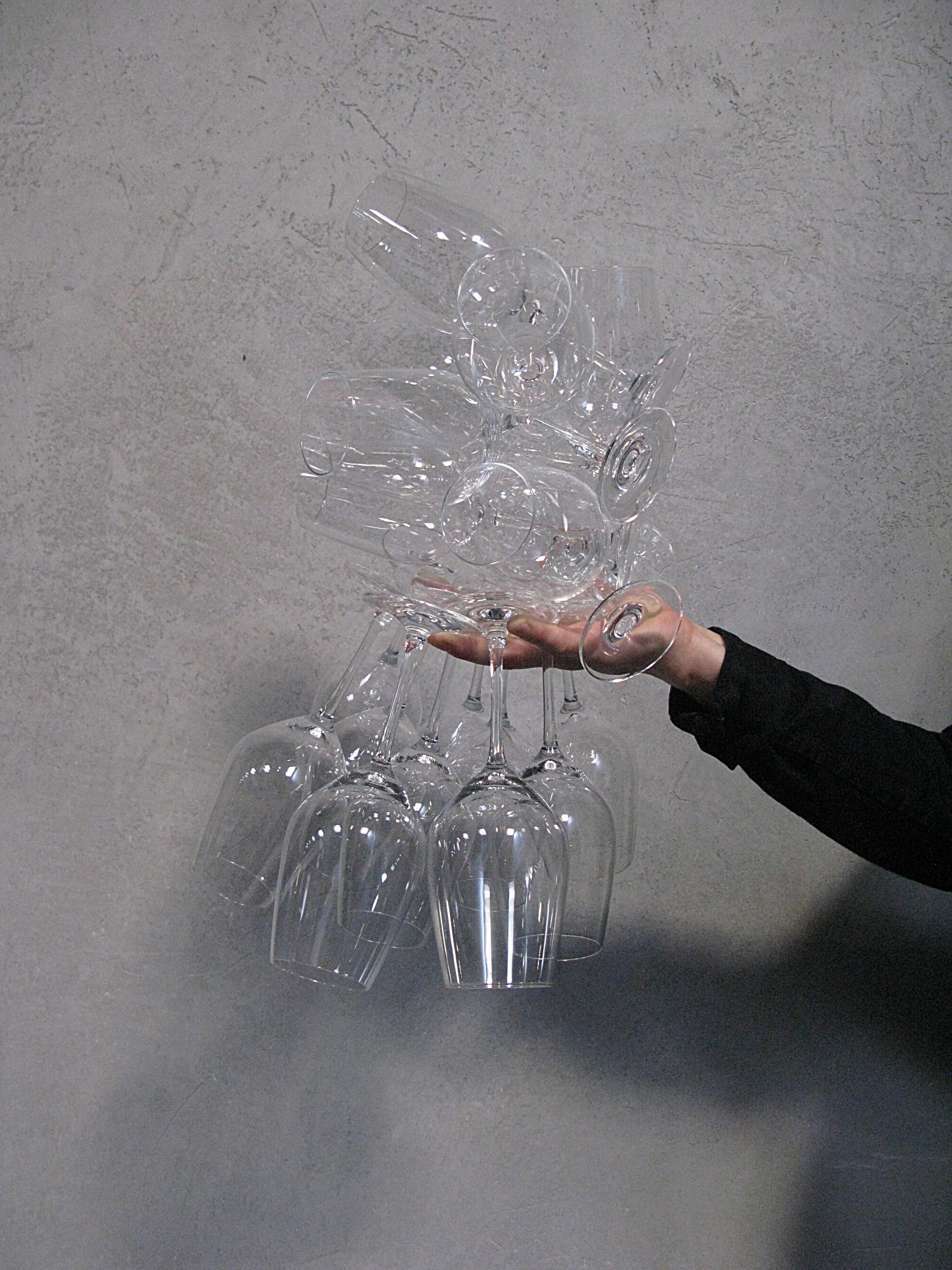
A waiter balancing wine glasses

Balance in biomechanics, is an ability to maintain the line of gravity (vertical line from centre of mass) of a body within the base of support with minimal postural sway. Sway is the horizontal movement of the centre of gravity even when a person is standing still. A certain amount of sway is essential and inevitable due to small perturbations within the body (e.g., breathing, shifting body weight from one foot to the other or from forefoot to rearfoot) or from external triggers (e.g., visual distortions, floor translations). An increase in sway is not necessarily an indicator of dysfunctional balance so much as it is an indicator of decreased sensorimotor control.

== Maintaining balance ==
Maintaining balance requires coordination of input from multiple sensory systems including the vestibular, somatosensory, and visual systems.

- Vestibular system: sense organs that regulate equilibrium (equilibrioception); directional information as it relates to head position (internal gravitational, linear, and angular acceleration)
- Somatosensory system: senses of proprioception and kinesthesia of joints; information from skin and joints (pressure and vibratory senses); spatial position and movement relative to the support surface; movement and position of different body parts relative to each other
- Visual system: Reference to verticality of body and head motion; spatial location relative to objects

The senses must detect changes of spatial orientation with respect to the base of support, regardless of whether the body moves or the base is altered. There are environmental factors that can affect balance such as light conditions, floor surface changes, alcohol, drugs, and ear infection.

== Balance impairments ==
There are balance impairments associated with aging. Age-related decline in the ability of the above systems to receive and integrate sensory information contributes to poor balance in older adults. As a result, the elderly are at an increased risk of falls. In fact, one in three adults aged 65 and over will fall each year.

In the case of an individual standing quietly upright, the limit of stability is defined as the amount of postural sway at which balance is lost and corrective action is required.

Body sway can occur in all planes of motion, which make it an increasingly difficult ability to rehabilitate. There is strong evidence in research showing that deficits in postural balance is related to the control of medial-lateral stability and an increased risk of falling. To remain balanced, a person standing must be able to keep the vertical projection of their center of mass within their base of support, resulting in little medial-lateral or anterior-posterior sway. Ankle sprains are one of the most frequently occurring injuries among athletes and physically active people. The most common residual disability post ankle sprain is instability along with body sway. Mechanical instability includes insufficient stabilizing structures and mobility that exceed physiological limits. Functional instability involves recurrent sprains or a feeling of giving way of the ankle. Nearly 40% of patients with ankle sprains suffer from instability and an increase in body sway. Injury to the ankle causes a proprioceptive deficit and impaired postural control. Individuals with muscular weakness, occult instability, and decreased postural control are more susceptible to ankle injury than those with better postural control.

Balance can be severely affected in individuals with neurological conditions. People who suffer a stroke or spinal cord injury for example, can struggle with this ability. Impaired balance is strongly associated with future function and recovery after a stroke, and is the strongest predictor of falls.

Another population where balance is severely affected is Parkinson's disease patients. A study done by Nardone and Schieppati (2006) showed that individuals with Parkinson's disease problems in balance have been related to a reduced limit of stability and an impaired production of anticipatory motor strategies and abnormal calibration.

Balance can also be negatively affected in a normal population through fatigue in the musculature surrounding the ankles, knees, and hips. Studies have found, however, that muscle fatigue around the hips (gluteals and lumbar extensors) and knees have a greater effect on postural stability (sway). It is thought that muscle fatigue leads to a decreased ability to contract with the correct amount of force or accuracy. As a result, proprioception and kinesthetic feedback from joints are altered so that conscious joint awareness may be negatively affected.

== Balance training ==
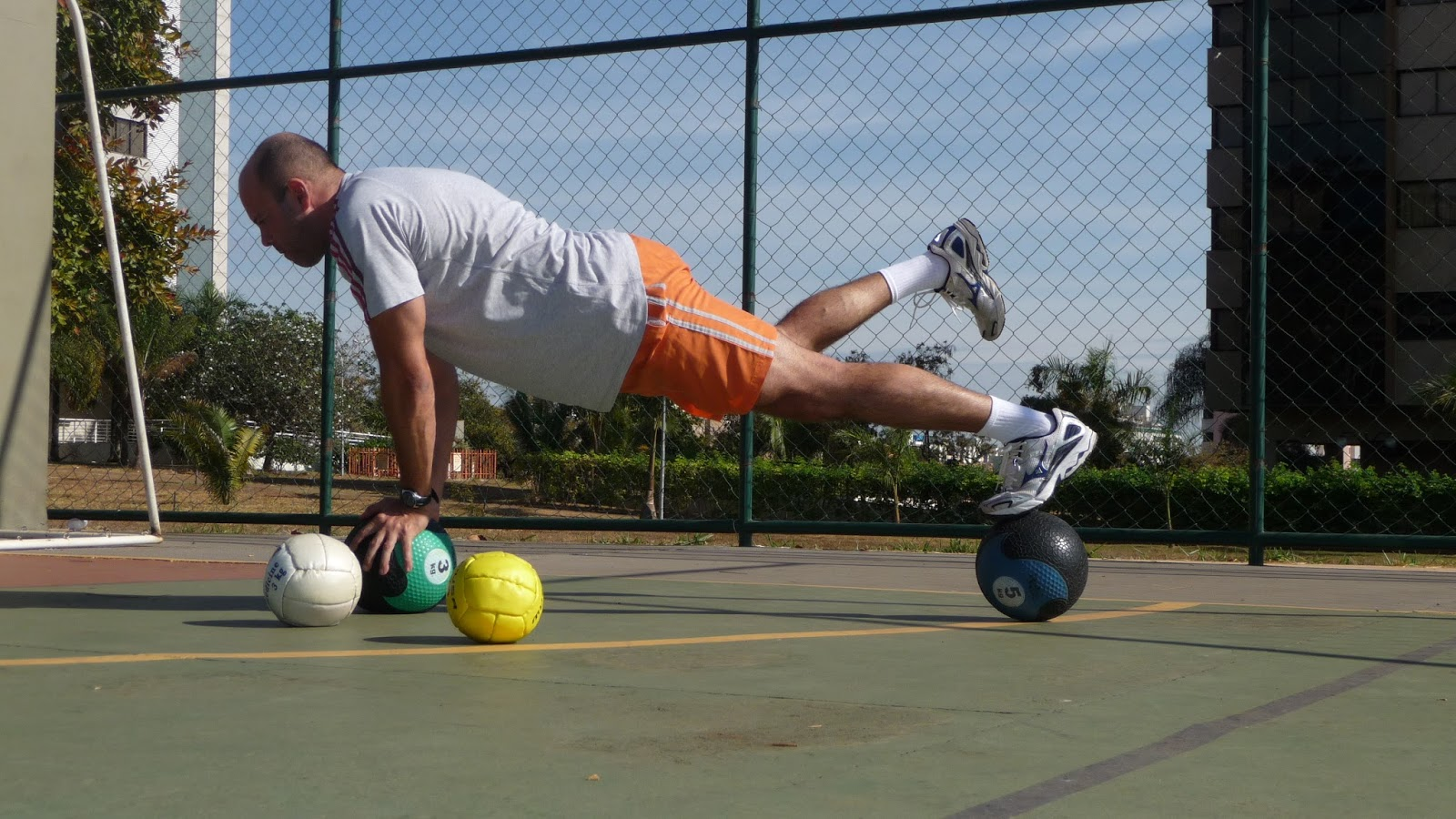
Balance Training

Since balance is a key predictor of recovery and is required in many activities of daily living, it is often introduced into treatment plans by physiotherapists and occupational therapists when dealing with geriatrics, patients with neurological conditions, or others for whom balance training has been determined to be beneficial.

Balance training in stroke patients has been supported in the literature. Methods commonly used and proven to be effective for this population include sitting or standing balance practice with various progressions including reaching, variations in base of support, use of tilt boards, gait training varying speed, and stair climbing exercises. Another method to improve balance is perturbation training, which is an external force applied to a person's center of mass in an attempt to move it from the base of support. The type of training should be determined by a physiotherapist and will depend on the nature and severity of the stroke, stage of recovery, and the patient's abilities and impairments after the stroke.

Populations such as the elderly, children with neuromuscular diseases, and those with motor deficits such as chronic ankle instability have all been studied and balance training has been shown to result in improvements in postural sway and improved "one-legged stance balance" in these groups. The effects of balance training can be measured by more varied means, but typical quantitative outcomes are centre of pressure (CoP), postural sway, and static/dynamic balance, which are measured by the subject's ability to maintain a set body position while undergoing some type of instability.

Studies have suggested, higher level of physical activity have shown to reduce the morbidity and mortality along with risk of fall up to 30% to 50%. Some types of exercise (gait, balance, co-ordination and functional tasks; strengthening exercise; 3D exercise and multiple exercise types) improve clinical balance outcomes in older people, and are seemingly safe. A study has shown to be effective in improving ability to balance after undergoing aerobic exercises along with resistance exercises. There is still insufficient evidence supporting general physical activity, computerized balance programs or vibration plates.

== Functional balance assessments ==
Functional tests of balance focus on maintenance of both static and dynamic balance, whether it involves a type of perturbation/change of center of mass or during quiet stance. Standardized tests of balance are available to allow allied health care professionals to assess an individual's postural control. Some functional balance tests that are available are:

- Romberg Test: used to determine proprioceptive contributions to upright balance. Subject remains in quiet standing while eyes are open. If this test is not difficult enough, there is a Sharpened Romberg's test. Subjects would have to have their arms crossed, feet together and eyes closed. This decreases the base of support, raises the subject's center of mass, and prevents them from using their arms to help balance.
- Functional Reach Test: measures the maximal distance one can reach forward beyond arm's length while maintaining feet planted in a standing position.
- Berg Balance Scale: measures static and dynamic balance abilities using functional tasks commonly performed in everyday life. One study reports that the Berg Balance Scale is the most commonly used assessment tool throughout stroke rehabilitation, and found it to be a sound measure of balance impairment in patients following a stroke. Berg balance scale is known to be the golden test. BBS was first published in 1989 and to this day (2022), it's still effective.
- Performance-Oriented Mobility Assessment (POMA): measures both static and dynamic balance using tasks testing balance and gait.
- Timed Up and Go Test: measures dynamic balance and mobility.
- Balance Efficacy Scale: self-report measure that examines an individual's confidence while performing daily tasks with or without assistance.
- Star Excursion Test: A dynamic balance test that measures single stance maximal reach in multiple directions.
- Balance Evaluation Systems Test (BESTest): Tests for 6 unique balance control methods to create a specialized rehabilitation protocol by identifying specific balance deficits.
- The Mini-Balance Evaluation Systems Test (Mini-BESTest): Is a short form of the Balance Evaluation System Test that is used widely in both clinical practice and research. The test is used to assess balance impairments and includes 14 items of dynamic balance task, divided in to four subcomponents: anticipatory postural adjustments, reactive postural control, sensory orientation and dynamic gait. Mini-BESTest has been tested for mainly neurological diseases, but also other diseases. A review of psychometric properties of the test support the reliability, validity and responsiveness, and according to the review, it can be considered a standard balance measure.
- BESS: The BESS (Balance Error Scoring System) is a commonly used way to assess balance. It is known as a simple and affordable way to get an accurate assessment of balance, although the validity of the BESS protocol has been questioned. The BESS is often used in sports settings to assess the effects of mild to moderate head injury on one's postural stability. The BESS tests three separate stances (double leg, single leg, tandem) on two different surfaces (firm surface and medium density foam) for a total of six tests. Each test is 20 seconds long, with the entire time of the assessment approximately 5–7 minutes. The first stance is the double leg stance. The participant is instructed to stand on a firm surface with feet side by side with hands on hips and eyes closed. The second stance is the single leg stance. In this stance the participant is instructed to stand on their non-dominant foot on a firm surface with hands on hips and eyes closed. The third stance is the tandem stance. The participant stands heel to toe on a firm surface with hands on hips and eyes closed. The fourth, fifth, and sixth stances repeat in order stances one, two, and three except the participant performs these stances on a medium density foam surface. The BESS is scored by an examiner who looks for deviations from the proper stances. A deviation is noted when any of the following occurs in the participant during testing: opening the eyes, removing hands from the hips, stumbling forward or falling, lifting the forefoot or heel off the testing surface, abduction or flexion of the hip beyond 30 degrees, or remaining out of the proper testing position for more than 5 seconds.

Concussion (or mild traumatic brain injury) have been associated with imbalance among sports participants and military personnel. Some of the standard balance tests may be too easy or time-consuming for application to these high-functioning groups, s. Expert recommendations have been gathered concerning balance assessments appropriate to military service-members.

== Quantitative (computerized) assessments ==
Due to recent technological advances, a growing trend in balance assessments has become the monitoring of center of pressure (terrestrial locomotion) (CoP), the reaction vector of center of mass on the ground, path length for a specified duration. With quantitative assessments, minimal CoP path length is suggestive of good balance. Laboratory-grade force plates are considered the "gold-standard" of measuring CoP. The NeuroCom Balance Manager (NeuroCom, Clackamas, OR, United States) is a commercially available dynamic posturography system that uses computerized software to track CoP during different tasks. These different assessments range from the sensory organization test looking at the different systems that contribute through sensory receptor input to the limits of stability test observing a participant's ankle range of motion, velocity, and reaction time. While the NeuroCom is considered the industry standard for balance assessments, it does come at a steep price (about $250,000).

Research has investigated low-cost portable devices for measuring center of pressure (CoP). The Nintendo Wii Balance Board (Nintendo, Kyoto, Japan) has been compared with laboratory force plates and reported to provide comparable CoP measurements. Due to its lower cost, it has been proposed as an alternative for clinical balance assessment. Low-cost custom-built force plates have also been developed for this purpose.

== Fatigue's effect on balance ==
The complexity of balance allows for many confounding variables to affect a person's ability to stay upright. Fatigue, causing central nervous system (CNS) dysfunction, can indirectly result in the inability to remain upright. This is seen repeatedly in clinical populations (e.g. Parkinson's disease, multiple sclerosis). Another major concern regarding fatigue's effect on balance is in the athletic population. Balance testing has become a standard measure to help diagnose concussions in athletes, but due to the fact that athletes can be extremely fatigued has made it hard for clinicians to accurately determine how long the athletes need to rest before fatigue is gone, and they can measure balance to determine if the athlete is concussed. So far, researchers have only been able to estimate that athletes need anywhere from 8–20 minutes of rest before testing balance That can be a huge difference depending on the circumstances.

== Other factors influencing balance ==
Age, gender, and height have all been shown to impact an individual's ability to balance and the assessment of that balance. Typically, older adults have more body sway with all testing conditions. Tests have shown that older adults demonstrate shorter functional reach and larger body sway path lengths. Height also influences body sway in that as height increases, functional reach typically decreases. However, this test is only a measure of anterior and posterior sway. This is done to create a repeatable and reliable clinical balance assessment tool. A 2011 Cochrane Review found that specific types of exercise (such as gait, balance, co-ordination and functional tasks; strengthening exercises; 3D exercises [e.g. Tai Chi] and combinations of these) can help improve balance in older adults. However, there was no or limited evidence on the effectiveness of general physical activities, such as walking and cycling, computer-based balance games and vibration plates.

== Voluntary control of balance ==
While balance is mostly an automatic process, voluntary control is common. Active control usually takes place when a person is in a situation where balance is compromised. This can have the counter-intuitive effect of increasing postural sway during basic activities such as standing. One explanation for this effect is that conscious control results in over-correcting an instability and "may inadvertently disrupt relatively automatic control processes." While concentration on an external task "promotes the utilization of more automatic control processes."

== Balance and dual-tasking ==
Supra-postural tasks are those activities that rely on postural control while completing another behavioral goal, such as walking or creating a text message while standing upright. Research has demonstrated that postural stability operates to permit the achievement of other activities. In other words, standing in a stable upright position is not at all beneficial if one falls as soon as any task is attempted. In a healthy individual, it is believed that postural control acts to minimize the amount of effort required (not necessarily to minimize sway), while successfully accomplishing the supra-postural task. Research has shown that spontaneous reductions in postural sway occur in response to the addition of a secondary goal.

McNevin and Wulf (2002) found an increase in postural performance when directing an individual's attention externally compared to directing attention internally That is, focusing attention on the effects of one's movements rather than on the movement itself will boost performance. This results from the use of more automatic and reflexive control processes. When one is focused on their movements (internal focus), they may inadvertently interfere with these automatic processes, decreasing their performance. Externally focusing attention improves postural stability, despite increasing postural sway at times. It is believed that utilizing automatic control processes by focusing attention externally enhances both performance and learning. Adopting an external focus of attention subsequently improves the performance of supra-postural tasks, while increasing postural stability.
