= Chymotrypsin-like elastases =

Family of enzymes

Pancreatic elastase I

Identifiers
- EC no.: 3.4.21.36
- CAS no.: 848900-32-3

Databases
- BRENDA: enzyme data
- ExPASy: NiceZyme view
- KEGG: enzyme entry
- MetaCyc: metabolic pathway
- Rhea: reactions
- PDB structures: RCSB PDB PDBe PDBsum
- Gene Ontology: AmiGO / QuickGO
Search
- PMC: articles
- PubMed: articles
- NCBI: proteins

Pancreatic elastase II

Identifiers
- EC no.: 3.4.21.71
- CAS no.: 75603-19-9

Databases
- BRENDA: enzyme data
- ExPASy: NiceZyme view
- KEGG: enzyme entry
- MetaCyc: metabolic pathway
- Rhea: reactions
- PDB structures: RCSB PDB PDBe PDBsum
- Gene Ontology: AmiGO / QuickGO
Search
- PMC: articles
- PubMed: articles
- NCBI: proteins

Pancreatic endopeptidase E

Identifiers
- EC no.: 3.4.21.70
- CAS no.: 68073-27-8

Databases
- BRENDA: enzyme data
- ExPASy: NiceZyme view
- KEGG: enzyme entry
- MetaCyc: metabolic pathway
- Rhea: reactions
- PDB structures: RCSB PDB PDBe PDBsum
Search
- PMC: articles
- PubMed: articles
- NCBI: proteins

The chymotrypsin-like elastases (CELAs), sometimes misleadingly called pancreatic elastases, are a family of enzymes found in humans and other mammals. In humans, there are five members, encoded by the genes CELA1, CELA2A, CELA2B, CELA3A, and CELA3B. CELA1, CELA2A, and CELA2B can function as elastases, and break down elastin. Except for CELA1, CELAs are produced and secreted by the acinar cells of the pancreas. The four pancreatic enzymes are initially produced as an inactive zymogen and later activated in the duodenum by trypsin.

Elastases form a subfamily of serine proteases, characterized by a distinctive structure consisting of two beta barrel domains converging at the active site that hydrolyze amides and esters amongst many proteins in addition to elastin, a type of connective tissue that holds organs together.

The first family member, CELA1 (called pancreatic elastase 1 at the time), was initially thought to be expressed in the pancreas. However it was later discovered that it was the only chymotrypsin-like elastase that was not expressed in the pancreas. In fact, pancreatic elastase is expressed in basal layers of epidermis (at protein level). Hence pancreatic elastase 1 has been renamed elastase 1 (ELA1) or chymotrypsin-like elastase family, member 1 (CELA1). For a period of time, it was thought that ELA1 / CELA1 was not transcribed into a protein. However it was later discovered that it was expressed in skin keratinocytes.

Clinical literature that describes human elastase 1 activity in the pancreas or fecal material is actually referring to chymotrypsin-like elastase family, member 3B (CELA3B).

== Structure ==
Pancreatic elastase is a compact globular protein with a hydrophobic core. This enzyme is formed by three subunits. Each subunit binds one calcium ion (cofactor). There are three important metal-binding sites in amino acids 77, 82, 87. The catalytic triad, located in the active site is formed by three hydrogen-bonded amino acid residues (H71, D119, S214), and plays an essential role in the cleaving ability of all proteases. It is composed of a single peptide chain of 240 amino acids and contains 4 disulfide bridges. It has a high degree of sequence identity with pancreatic elastases that correspond to other species, such as the rat's, with whom it shares 86% of its sequence. Its enzymatic activity is a result of the specific three-dimensional conformation which its single polypeptide chain adopts, and therefore, activity is lost by denaturation and/or conformational changes.

== Inhibitors ==
Elafin, the skin-derived elastase inhibitor, has been shown to be a potent and specific inhibitor of both the porcine homolog of ELA1 and human leukocyte elastase in vitro. Elafin is expressed by epidermal keratinocytes under hyperproliferative conditions such as psoriasis and wound healing. It has also been reported to be present in many other adult epithelia that are exposed to environmental stimuli: tongue, plate, lingual tonsils, gingiva, pharynx, epiglottis, vocal fold, esophagus, uterine cervix, vagina, and hair follicles. In all these tissues, the presence of inflammatory cells is physiologic and elafin expression is believed to protect against leukocyte proteases, thereby helping to maintain epithelial integrity.

Elafin on the contrary has never been found in the basal layer in any type of epithelial tissue. Indeed, elafin is virtually absent in normal human epidermis. The other known elastase inhibitor, SLPI, however, has been reported to be expressed in the basal keratinocytes suggesting that this may be the major elastase inhibitor in normal epidermis.

Alpha 1-antitrypsin and alpha-2-macroglobulin are human serum protease inhibitors that completely inhibit the general proteolytic activity of pancreatic elastase 1 and 2. It has been observed that a protease must be active in order to bind to these two inhibitors. Studies proved that the activity of elastase 2 was enhanced in 25-250 mM NaCl. The activity of elastase 2 in NaCl approached approximately twice the activity without NaCl. Elastase 1 is slightly inhibited above 150 mM NaCl

== Clinical significance ==
Mutations of the CELA1 gene were suspected to be associated with diffuse nonepidermolytic palmoplantar keratoderma (diffuse NEPPK). However the suspected sequence variant was fully functional and did not strongly associate with the disease. More recently, a specific mutation in the KRT6C gene has been linked to some cases of diffuse NEPPK.

A possible polymorphism of the CELA1 gene coding this protein was found. On a secondary structure level, this polymorphism manifests itself in an excision of a short sequence of CELA1. The disappeared sequence carries the key amino acid residues Val-227 and Thr-239, which contribute to the substrate specificity of elastase I (highlighted in Figure 3), as well as five of the eight amino acids involved in the primary contact of the elafin(inhibitor)/elastase complex formation. These observations imply that the sequence variant might modify the substrate specificity of the enzyme and abolish the inhibitor binding capability. Though there were no obvious pathogenic epidermal abnormalities associated with the truncated ELA1 variant, it is possible that carriers of the polymorphism may be at greater risk of developing the common skin diseases such as psoriasis and eczema (genetic and histologic studies will be required to investigate the role of ELA1 in these common epidermal disorders.).

== Biosynthesis ==
Pancreatic elastase is formed by activation of proelastase from mammalian pancreas by trypsin. After processing to proelastase, it is stored in the zymogen granules and then activated to elastase in the duodenum by the tryptic cleavage of a peptide bond in the inactive form of the precursor molecule. This process results in the removal of an activation peptide from the N-terminal, that enables the enzyme to adopt its native conformation.

== Chymotrypsin-like elastase family ==
Humans have five chymotrypsin-like elastase genes which encode the structurally similar proteins:

Family	Gene symbol		Protein name		EC number	Notes
Family	Approved	Previous	Approved	Previous	EC number	Notes
chymotrypsin- like	CELA1	ELA1	chymotrypsin-like elastase family, member 1	elastase 1, pancreatic	EC 3.4.21.36	Not found in pancreas
chymotrypsin- like	CELA2A	ELA2A	chymotrypsin-like elastase family, member 2A	elastase 2A, pancreatic	EC 3.4.21.71	
chymotrypsin- like	CELA2B	ELA2B	chymotrypsin-like elastase family, member 2B	elastase 2B, pancreatic	EC 3.4.21.71	
chymotrypsin- like	CELA3A	ELA3A	chymotrypsin-like elastase family, member 3A	elastase 3A, pancreatic	EC 3.4.21.70	Mostly doesn't act on elastin
chymotrypsin- like	CELA3B	ELA3B	chymotrypsin-like elastase family, member 3B	elastase 3B, pancreatic	EC 3.4.21.70	Mostly doesn't act on elastin

== Post-translational modifications ==
Glycosylation at Asn79 and Asn233.

== Gene ==
The gene that codes for pancreatic elastase 1 is CELA1 (synonym: ELA1) Pancreatic elastase 1 is encoded by a single genetic locus on chromosome 12. Studies of human pancreatic elastase 1 have shown that this serine protease maps to the chromosomal region 12q13 and it is close to a locus for an autosomal dominant skin disease, Diffuse nonepidermolytic palmoplantar keratoderma.

== Reactions ==
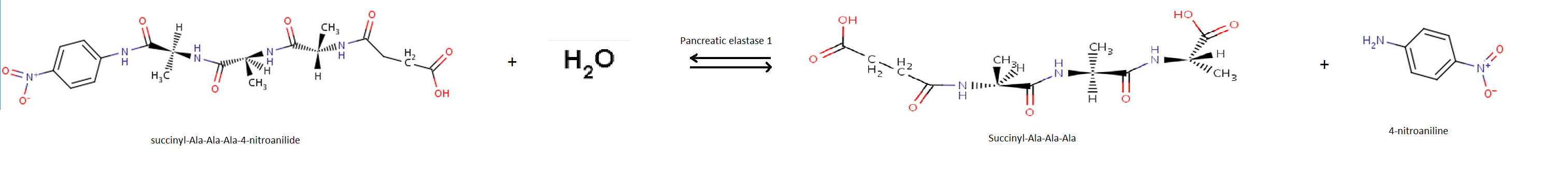
Reaction catalysed by pancreatic elastase 1. This image represents the hydrolysis of the succinyl-Ala-Ala-Ala-p-nitroanalide. The addition of one water molecule provokes the hydrolysis of the molecule and the release of p-nitroaniline.

The hydrolysis that elastases bring about occur in several steps, starting with the formation of a complex between elastase and its substrate, with the carbonyl carbon positioned near the nucleophilic serine, followed by a nucleophillic attack that forms an acyl-enzyme intermediate (a pair of electrons from the double bond of the carbonyl oxygen moves to the oxygen) while the first product is released. The intermediate is then hydrolyzed in a deacylation step, regenerating the active enzyme and resulting in the release of the second product ( the electron-deficient carbonyl carbon re-forms the double bond with the oxygen and the C-terminus of the peptide is released. It preferentially cleaves peptide bonds at the carbonyl end of amino acid residues with small hydrophobic side chains such as glycine, valine, leucine, isoleucine and alanine. The wide specificity of elastases for non-aromatic uncharged side chains can explain its ability to break down native elastin.

== Use in diagnostic tests ==
Fecal elastase is an enzyme originally thought to be pancreatic elastase 1 (CELA1), but this was discovered to be an error, and it is actually likely be CELA3B. Fecal elastase is not degraded in intestinal transit, so that its concentration in feces reflects exocrine pancreatic function. In inflammation of the pancreas, fecal elastase is released into the bloodstream. Thus the quantification of fecal elastase in serum allows diagnosis or exclusion of acute pancreatitis.

Main indications:

- Diagnosis and exclusion of exocrine pancreatic insufficiency caused by, e.g., chronic pancreatitis, cystic fibrosis, diabetes mellitus, cholelithiasis (gallstones), failure to thrive, pancreatic cancer, papillary stenosis
- Follow-up monitoring of patients with mild or moderate pancreatic insufficiency
- Diagnosis and exclusion of pancreatic involvement in, e.g., gastrointestinal symptoms, abdominal pain, osteoporosis.

Method of detection:

- Sandwich ELISA with two monoclonal antibodies highly specific for fecal elastase
- The ELISA kit is based on a microtiter plate (96 well format) with 12 breakable single strips x 8 wells suitable for up to 42 samples in duplicate

Reference concentration to interpret Pancreatic Elastase results: For adults and children after the first month of life

- Values > 200 μg elastase/g stool indicate normal exocrine pancreatic function
- Values of 100-200 μg elastase/g stool suggest mild to moderate pancreatic insufficiency
- Values < 100 μg elastase/g stool indicate exocrine pancreatic insufficiency.
