= Caloric reflex test =

Test of the vestibulo-ocular reflex

Caloric reflex test, vestibulo-ocular reflex
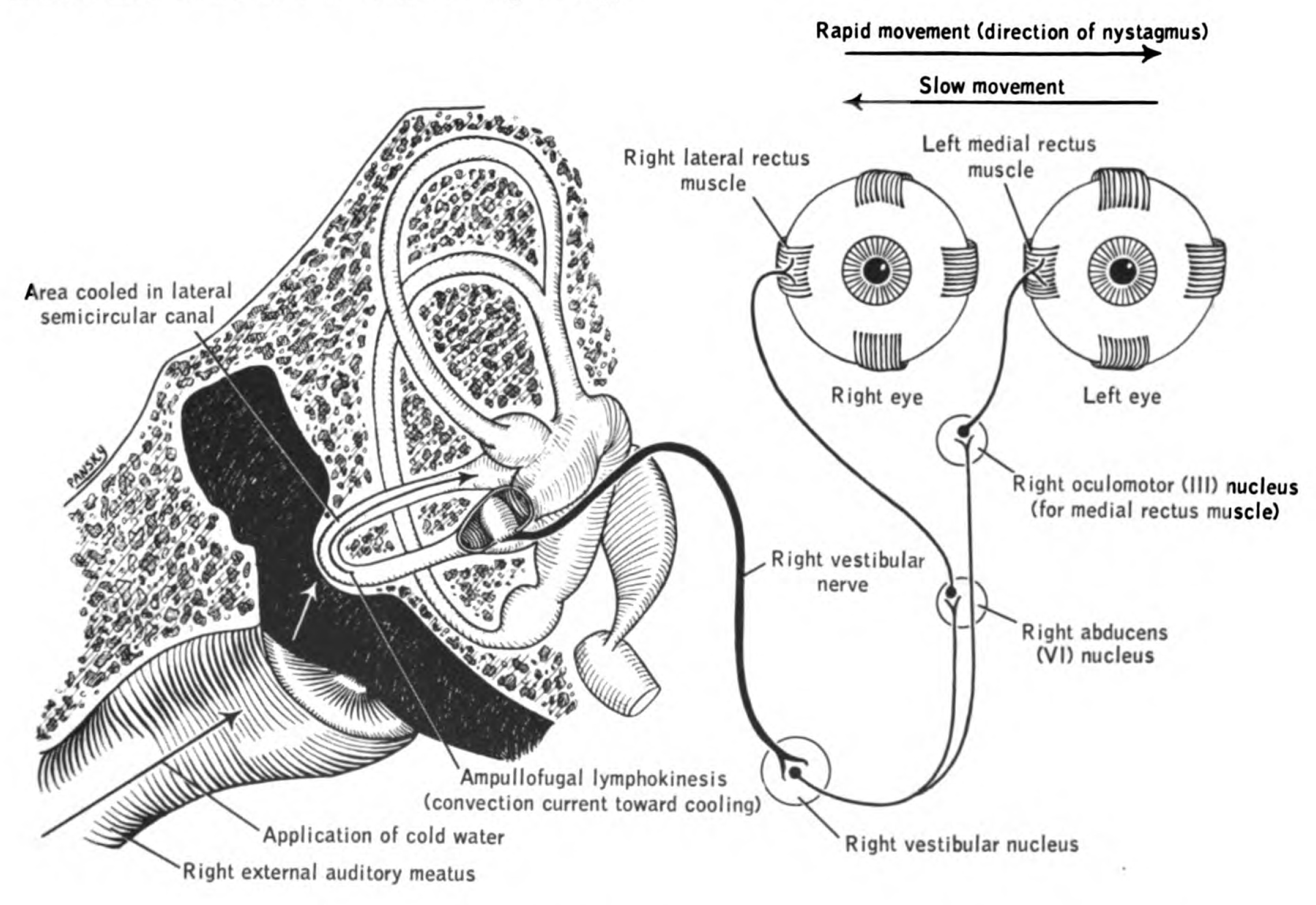
- Caloric test. Cold water introduced into right external meatus showing effects opposite to that produced by introduction of hot water. (Lawrence et al. 1960)
- ICD-9-CM: 95.44
- MedlinePlus: 003429

In medicine, the caloric reflex test (sometimes termed "vestibular caloric stimulation") is a test of the vestibulo-ocular reflex that involves irrigating cold or warm water or air into the external auditory canal. This method was developed by Robert Bárány, who won a Nobel Prize in 1914 for this discovery.

== Utility ==
The test is commonly used by physicians, audiologists and other trained professionals to validate a diagnosis of asymmetric function in the peripheral vestibular system. Calorics are usually a subtest of the electronystagmography (ENG) battery of tests. It is one of several tests which can be used to test for brain stem death.

One novel use of this test has been to provide temporary pain relief from phantom limb pains in amputees and paraplegics. It can also induce a temporary remission of anosognosia, the visual and personal aspects of hemispatial neglect, hemianesthesia, and other consequences of right hemispheric damage.

== Technique and results ==
Ice cold or warm water or air is introduced into the external auditory canal, usually using a syringe. The temperature difference between the body and the injected water creates a convective current in the endolymph of the nearby lateral semicircular canal. Hot and cold water produce currents in opposite directions and therefore a horizontal nystagmus in opposite directions. In patients with an intact brainstem:

- If the water is warm (44 °C or above) endolymph in the ipsilateral horizontal canal rises, causing an increased rate of firing in the vestibular afferent nerve. This situation mimics a head turn to the ipsilateral side. Both eyes will turn toward the contralateral ear, with horizontal nystagmus (quick horizontal eye movements) to the ipsilateral ear.
- If the water is cold, relative to body temperature (30 °C or below), the endolymph falls within the semicircular canal, decreasing the rate of vestibular afferent firing. This situation mimics a head turn to the contralateral side. The eyes then turn toward the ipsilateral ear, with horizontal nystagmus to the contralateral ear.

Absent reactive eye movement suggests vestibular weakness of the horizontal semicircular canal of the side being stimulated.

In comatose patients with cerebral damage, the fast phase of nystagmus will be absent as this is controlled by the cerebrum. As a result, using cold water irrigation will result in deviation of the eyes toward the ear being irrigated. If both phases are absent, this suggests the patient's brainstem reflexes are also damaged and carries a very poor prognosis.

While large interindividual differences exist, females exhibit a slightly higher average caloric excitability than males.

== See also ==
- Balance disorder
- Inner ear
