= Electronystagmography =

- ICD-9-CM: 95.24
- MeSH: D004584
- MedlinePlus: 003448

Electronystagmography (ENG) is a diagnostic test to record involuntary movements of the eye caused by a condition known as nystagmus. It can also be used to diagnose the cause of vertigo, dizziness or balance dysfunction by testing the vestibular system. Electronystagmography is used to assess voluntary and involuntary eye movements. It evaluates the cochlear nerve and the oculomotor nerve (CN III). The ENG can be used to determine the origin of various eye and ear disorders.

== Technique and results ==
Electrodes applied around the eyes record eye movements using the corneo-retinal potential. Some portions of the ENG measure a patient's ability to track a moving stimuli while others observe the presence of nystagmus. The vestibular system monitors the position and movements of the head to stabilize retinal images. This information is integrated with the visual system and spinal afferents in the brain stem to produce the vestibulo-ocular reflex (VOR). ENG provides an objective assessment of the oculomotor and vestibular systems. A newer standard for the recording is the use of infrared video systems which allow for a more detailed observation and analysis of these eye movements, called video nystagmography (VNG). A similar test is performed for testing vertigo by using the caloric reflex test, which can be induced by air or water of specific temperatures, typically ± 7 degrees Celsius from body temperature.

The standard ENG test battery consists of three parts:

- oculomotor evaluation
- positioning and positional testing
- caloric stimulation of the vestibular system

The comparison of results obtained from various subtests of ENG assists in determining whether a disorder is central or peripheral. In peripheral vestibular disorders, the side of lesion can be inferred from the results of caloric stimulation and, to some degree, from positional findings.

ENG or VNG can be used to record nystagmus during oculomotor tests such as saccades, pursuit and gaze testing, optokinetics and also calorics (dithermal or monothermal). Abnormal oculomotor test results may indicate either systemic or central pathology as opposed to peripheral (vestibular) pathology.

Optokinetics generally are used as a cross-check on abnormal responses to oculomotor tests. Both of these tests use a "light bar" involving a moving light (usually red) which the patient will track with the eyes.

The caloric irrigation is the only vestibular test which allows the clinician to test the vestibular organs individually; however, it only tests one of the three semicircular canals: the horizontal canal.

While ENG is the most widely used clinical laboratory test to assess vestibular function, normal ENG test results do not necessarily mean that a patient has typical vestibular function. ENG abnormalities can be useful in the diagnosis and localization of the site of lesion; however, many abnormalities are nonlocalizing; therefore, the clinical history and otologic examination of the patient are vital in formulating a diagnosis and treatment plan for a patient presenting with dizziness or vertigo.
