= Videonystagmography =

- Purpose: inner ear function

Videonystagmography (VNG) is a type of testing used to assess vestibular and central nervous system function through the use of eye movement tracking, specifically evaluating nystagmus. The older version of technology used to perform these tests, known as electronystagmography (ENG), leverages electrophysiological signals. There is a battery of tests which can be performed using this technology and testing, typically performed by an audiologist. These tests can be diagnostic in nature or used to monitor rehabilitation. The testing typically takes place in a dark or dimmed room with the patient laying or sitting, depending on the test, on a table or chair that can lean back to a flat position. The patient wears goggles containing a camera that tracks the pupils using infrared imaging; the video eye-tracking system records and sends pupil movement tracings to a computer typically with VNG analysis software. The goggles may also have a cover in order to deny vision for some tests while still recording eye movement. There may be some kind of screen or light bar used to present visual stimuli, though providers may use other kinds of visual stimuli for portions of the testing. VNG can determine whether dizziness is caused by inner ear disease, particularly benign paroxysmal positional vertigo (BPPV), as opposed to some other cause such as low blood pressure or anxiety.

VNG testing is made up of several components.

Another portion of the test requires the patient to sit in several different positions, such as lying flat staring up, head to the right, head to the left, body rolled to the right, and body rolled to the left.

The final part of the VNG requires caloric response testing.

== Oculomotor testing ==
=== Gaze ===
Gaze testing is performed to assess for spontaneous nystagmus, meaning a nystagmus present in the absence of visual or vestibular stimulation. The initial position is typically looking ahead, then up, down, left, and right and held for a short period of time. Gaze is typically assessed with vision and vision denied (the goggles are covered to take away any visual input).

=== Smooth pursuit/tracking ===
Smooth pursuit testing has the patient follow a visual target from left to right or up to down. Aspects analyzed are velocity gain, asymmetry, and phase angle.

=== Saccades ===
Saccades evaluate voluntary saccadic movement, which are quick eye movements to a target. A dot or visual target appears at random points along the screen, though only along the horizontal axis is common. The patient is instructed to not try to guess where the target will be. This test measures latency, velocity, and accuracy.

=== Optokinetic test ===
Optokinetic testing assesses a response that occurs when trying to stabilize focus on a target while the visual field itself is moving (due to the person's head moving); an example of this response is when focusing on passing objects out the window while seated on a moving train, bus, or car. This test assesses velocity gain and asymmetry.
