= Righting reflex =

Reflex on body orientation

The righting reflex, also known as the labyrinthine righting reflex, or the Cervico-collic reflex; is a reflex that corrects the orientation of the body when it is taken out of its normal upright position. It is initiated by the vestibular system, which detects that the body is not erect and causes the head to move back into position as the rest of the body follows. The perception of head movement involves the body sensing linear acceleration or the force of gravity through the otoliths, and angular acceleration through the semicircular canals. The reflex uses a combination of visual system inputs, vestibular inputs, and somatosensory inputs to make postural adjustments when the body becomes displaced from its normal vertical position. These inputs are used to create what is called an efference copy. This means that the brain makes comparisons in the cerebellum between expected posture and perceived posture, and corrects for the difference. The reflex takes 6 or 7 weeks to perfect, but can be affected by various types of balance disorders.

The righting reflex has also been studied in cats and other non-human mammals.

== Overview ==
=== Vestibular system ===
The vestibular system is composed of inner ear organs forming the "labyrinth": the semicircular canals, the otoliths, and the cochlea. The section below is an overview of the vestibular system, as it is crucial to the understanding of the righting reflex. Sensory information from the vestibular system allows the head to move back into position when disturbed as the rest of the body follows. The semicircular canals (brown, see figure) are arranged at angles to the horizontal plane of the head when it is in its normal vertical posture. Each canal has a widened base, called an ampulla, that houses specialized sensory hair cells. Fluid in these canals surrounds the hair cells, and moves across them as the head moves to gather information about the movement and position of the body. The hair cells are covered in tiny sensory hairs called stereocilia, which are sensitive to displacement forces as the body is moved in different positions. When the head is moved, the force moves the hair cells forward, which sends signals to afferent fibers and on to the brain. The brain can then decide which muscles in the body need to become active in order to right itself.

The semicircular canals have a superior, posterior, and horizontal component. Studies have shown that the horizontal canal is most correlated with agility, as shown with several mammals. Curvature and size of these canals seems to affect agility, and may be due to the environments in which animals navigate, such as a mostly two-dimensional landscape as compared to three-dimensional spaces (i.e. in the air, the trees, or the water).

The otoliths have two components: the utricle and the saccule. Both are made of the same sensory tissue containing hair cells, which is covered by a gelatinous layer and the otolithic membrane on top. Embedded in this membrane are calcium carbonate crystals, called otoconia, or "ear rocks." As the head is tilted forward or backward, the otoconia move the hair cells in a similar fashion to the semicircular canal fluid movement and cause depolarization of the hair cells. Signals from these cells are also transmitted along afferent fibers and on to the brain.

=== Signal transduction ===
Vestibular afferent signals are carried by type I or type II hair cells, which are distinguished by a larger amount of stereocilia per cell in type I cells than in type II cells. Nerve fibers attached to these hair cells carry signals to the vestibular nuclei in the brain, which are then used to gain information about the body's position. Larger diameter afferent fibers carry information from both type I and type II hair cells, and regular afferent fibers carry signals from type II hair cells. The semicircular canals encode head velocity signals, or angular acceleration, while the otoconia encode linear acceleration signals and gravitational signals. Regular afferent signals and irregular afferent signals travel to the vestibular nuclei in the brain, although irregular signals are at least two times more sensitive. Because of this, it has been questioned why humans have regular afferent signals. Studies have shown that regular afferent signals give information about how long the motion of the head or body lasts, and irregular afferent signals occur when the head is moved more violently, such as in falling.

== Function ==
The righting reflex involves complex muscular movements in response to a stimulus. When startled, the brain can evoke anticipatory postural adjustments, or a series of muscle movements, which involves the function of the midbrain. However, the mechanisms of such an origin are yet to be elucidated. Data support the generation of these movements from circuits in the spine connected to the supplementary motor area, the basal ganglia, and the reticular formation.

=== Reference frames ===
Visual input for proper righting reflex function is perceived in the form of reference frames, which create a representation of space for comparison to expected orientation. Three types of reference frames are used to perceive vertical orientation; they are consistently updated and quickly adapting to process changes in vestibular input.

==== Allocentric reference frame ====
The allocentric reference frame describes a visual reference frame based on the arrangement of objects in an organism's environment. To test for the use of an allocentric reference frame, a "rod-and-frame" test, in which a subject's perception of virtual objects in an environment are altered, can be used to cause a body tilt as the subject believes to be correcting for the shift.

==== Egocentric reference frame ====
The egocentric reference frame refers to a proprioceptive reference frame using the position of an organism's body in a space. This reference frame relies heavily on somatosensory information, or feedback from the body's sensory system. Muscle vibrations can be used to alter a subject's perception of the location of their bodies by creating an abnormal somatosensory signal.

==== Geocentric reference frame ====
The geocentric reference frame involves visual inputs to help detect the verticality of an environment through gravitational pull. The sole of the foot contains receptors in the skin to detect the force of gravity, and plays a large role in standing or walking balance. The abdominal organs also contain receptors that provide geocentric information. "Roll-tilt" tests in which a subject's body is mechanically moved can be used to test for geocentric reference frame function.

=== Pathways ===
The righting reflex can be described as a three-neuron arc system composed of primary vestibular neurons, vestibular nuclei neurons, and target motorneurons. Input from the vestibular system is received by sensory receptors in the hair cells of the semicircular canals and the otoliths, which are processed in the vestibular nuclei. The cerebellum is also active at this time for processing of what is called an efference copy, which compares expectations of the body's posture with how it is oriented at the time. The difference between expected posture and actual posture is corrected for via motorneurons in the spinal cord, which control muscle movements for righting the body.

These automatic postural adjustments can be explained in terms of two reflexes similar to the righting reflex: the vestibulo-ocular reflex (VOR) and the vestibulocollic reflex (VCR). The VOR involves movement of the eyes while the head turns to remain fixated on a stationary image, and the VCR involves control of neck muscles for correction of the head's orientation. During the VOR, the semicircular canals send information to the brain and correct eye movements in the direction opposite head movement by sending excitatory signals to motor neurons on the side opposite to the head rotation. Neurons in the otoliths control not only these signals for control of eye movements, but also signals for head movement correction through the neck muscles. The righting reflex utilizes the VOR and VCR as it brings the body back into position. Visual information under the control of these reflexes creates greater stability for more accurate postural correction.

=== Tests for righting reflex function ===
Vestibular function can be tested through a series of visual acuity tests. The static visual acuity test investigates a patient's ability to see an object from a distance by placing a subject at a certain distance from a letter fixed on a screen. The dynamic visual acuity test involves a patient's ability to control eye movements by following letters that appear on a screen. The difference between these two test results is the patient's fixation ability and vestibuloocular reflex (VOR) efficiency.

Vestibular reflexes can also be examined using body tilt experiments. Patients with vestibular disorders may go through the Dix-Hallpike maneuver, in which the patient is seated with legs extended and rotates the head 45 degrees. The patient is then asked to lie down on the table and checked for nystagmus, or uncontrollable eye movements. Nystagmus in patients indicates dysfunction of the vestibular system, which can lead to dizziness and inability to complete a righting reflex.

Proprioceptive ability tests are important in testing for righting reflex function. A therapist may ask a patient whether they know where a certain limb or joint is located without looking at it. These tests are often conducted on uneven surfaces, including sand and grass.

Recently, vestibular reflexes have been investigated using leg rotation experiments. A leg and foot rotation test can be used to investigate changes in neuron activity within the labyrinth, or the inner ear. When the head is rotated while the leg and foot are rotated 90 degrees, the vestibular signals cause the brain to inhibit movement in the direction of the rotation. At the same time, it activates the muscles on the opposite side in an attempt to correct for the displacement.

==== Plasticity ====
Because visual input is so critical in proper righting reflex function, impairment of vision can be detrimental. Blind patients can rely on vestibular input where visual input is not available, and the visual cortex can become rewired to accommodate other senses taking control. Developmentally blind patients have a larger portion of the brain dedicated to vestibular and somatosensory input than patients with normal visual function. Recently blind patients must form new connections where visual inputs once were, and vestibular therapy may enhance this ability. This principle, called neuroplasticity, is of growing interest to researchers today.

== Disorders ==
Many inner ear disorders can cause dizziness, which leads to dysfunctional righting reflex action. Common inner ear disorders can cause vertigo in patients, which can be acute or chronic symptoms. Labyrinthitis, or inflammation of the inner ear, can cause imbalances that must be overcome through therapeutic exercises. Labyrinthectomy, or removal of inner ear organs, is an operation conducted for patients with severe inner ear disorders whose vertigo is debilitating. Imbalances result from the procedure, but therapy can help overcome the symptoms.

=== Benign paroxysmal positional vertigo ===
Benign paroxysmal positional vertigo, or BPPV, is a disorder caused by the breaking off of a piece of otoconia from the otoliths. The otoconia floats freely in the inner ear fluid, causing disorientation and vertigo. The disorder can be tested for using a nystagmus test, such as the Dix-Hallpike maneuver. This disorder can disrupt the function of the righting reflex as the symptoms of vertigo and disorientation prevent proper postural control. Treatment for the disorder includes antihistamines and anticholinergics, and the disorder often goes away without surgical removal of the free otoconia.

=== Ménière's disease ===
Ménière's disease is thought to be a balance disorder involving fluid buildup in the inner ear. This can result from a number of factors, including head injury, ear infection, genetic predisposition, chemical toxicity, allergies, or syphilis. Syphilis can cause some patients to develop the disease later in life. The disease is characterized by pressure in the ears, ringing in the ears, and vertigo. It also causes nystagmus, or uncontrollable eye movements. There is no known treatment for the disorder, although symptoms can be treated. These include water pills to thin out ear fluid, eating a low-salt diet, and taking anti-nausea medication.

=== Other causes of righting reflex disorders ===
Vestibular and balance disorders can have a number of contributing factors. Dietary factors such as a high-salt diet, high caffeine intake, high sugar intake, monosodium glutamate (MSG) intake, dehydration, or food allergies can contribute to symptoms of vertigo and should be avoided in balance disorder patients. Other disorders can have symptoms of vertigo associated with them, such as epilepsy, migraine, stroke, or multiple sclerosis. Infectious diseases such as Lyme disease and meningitis can also cause vertigo.

== Righting reflex in animals ==
As a cat falls, it turns its head, rotates its spine, and aligns its hindquarters to land on its feet. This motion, coupled with free fall, creates a net zero angular momentum.

The righting reflex is not exclusive to humans. A well-known righting reflex in cats allows them to land on their feet after a fall. As a cat falls, it turns its head, rotates its spine, aligns its hindquarters, and arches its back to minimize injury. The cat reaches free fall to accomplish this, which is much lower than that of humans, and they are able to hit the ground in a relaxed body form to prevent serious injury.

Bats, however, have a unique vestibular system anatomy. Their balance system, at an orientation 180 degrees opposite to that of humans, allows them to perform powerful feats of flight while hunting in the dark. This ability couples vestibular function with sensory echolocation to hunt prey. However, they lack a righting reflex similar to most mammals. When exposed to zero-G, bats do not undergo the series of righting reflexes that most mammals do to correct orientation because they are accustomed to resting upside-down.
