= Neurotology =

Head and neck surgery (otorhinolaryngology) subspecialty

Neurotologist
Occupation
- Names: Doctor, Medical practitioner
- Occupation type: Profession
- Activity sectors: Medicine

Description
- Education required: Degree in Medicine
- Fields of employment: Hospitals, clinics
- Related jobs: Otology

Neurotology or neuro-otology is a subspecialty of otolaryngology—head and neck surgery, also known as ENT (ear, nose, and throat) medicine. Neuro-otology is closely related to otology, clinical neurology and neurosurgery.

Otology may refer to ENT physicians who "... [study] normal and pathological anatomy and physiology of the ear (hearing and vestibular sensory systems and related structures and functions) ...", and who treat diseases of the ear with medicine or surgery. In some instances, otology and neurotology are considered together—as so closely related that a clear demarcation between the subspecialties might not exist. For example, the University of Maryland Medical Center uses the term, "otologist/neurotologist".

Otologists and neurotologists have specialized in otolaryngology and then further specialized in pathological conditions of the ear and related structures. Many general otolaryngologists are trained in otology or middle ear surgery, performing surgery such as a tympanoplasty, or a reconstruction of the eardrum, when a hole remains from a prior ear tube or infection. Otologic surgery includes treatment of conductive hearing loss by reconstructing the hearing bones, or ossicles, as a result of infection, or by replacing the stapes bone with a stapedectomy for otosclerosis. Otology and neurotology encompass more complex surgery of the inner ear not typically performed by general otolaryngologists, such as removal of vestibular schwannoma, cholesteatoma, labyrinthectomy, surgery of the endolymphatic sac for Ménière's disease and cochlear implant surgery.

== Education and training ==
It is more and more common in the United States as well as around the world for otolaryngologists to obtain additional advanced training in neurotology, which requires an additional one or two years of fellowship training after the usual five years of residency.

== Conditions ==
Conditions treated by neurotologists include:

- Vestibular (balance) diseases, such as Ménière's disease and vestibular neuronitis
- Skull base tumors, such as vestibular schwannoma (acoustic neuroma)
- Facial nerve disorders, including facial nerve paralysis
- Hearing loss and deafness
- Certain conditions relating to the skull base

== See also ==
- Otology
- Audiology
- Clinical neurology
- Otolaryngology
- Speech–language pathology
