= Ilmari Pyykkö =

Finnish otolaryngologist

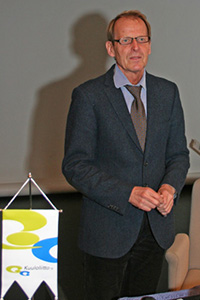
Ilmari Pyykkö

Vilho Ilmari Pyykkö (born 17 November 1944) is emeritus professor at the University of Tampere School of Medicine. He is a specialist in oto-rhino-laryngology. Pyykkö has been awarded numerous awards and grants for research including an Honor Award from the American Academy of Otolaryngology in 2000 and Golden Medal from the Prosper Menière Society in 2025.

== Education ==
Pyykkö attended the University of Helsinki and received his Licentiate of Medicine (1971) and his Doctorate of Medical Sciences (1974). In 1981 he received the qualification of docent employment (associate professor) in oto-, rhino-, and laryngology from the University of Lund and unpaid docent in 1984 from the University of Helsinki. He was granted fellowships at the Royal National Throat, Nose and Ear Hospital in London in 1978, the department of Otolaryngology in 1979 at Kyoto University in Japan, and in 1980 the Department of Otolaryngology and Maxillofacial Surgery at University of Iowa in USA.

== Work ==
Pyykkӧ began his career as a research associate at the University of Helsinki under the Department of Physiology from 1971 to 1973, He was a resident at the University Hospital of Halsinki and later in Lund where he the later half of this time specialist and senior physician. Next he spent a year as a senior researcher at the Institute of Occupational Health. He held various positions with University Hospital of Helsinki from 1991 to 1995 including clinical teacher, professor, and Vc. Professor of Ear, Nose, and Throat Diseases. In 1995 he started working as a professor and the Head of the section of Otorhinolaryngology at Karolinska Institute in Stockholm and continued this position until 2002. During this time he acted as prefect of the Institute of Ear and Skin at Karolinska Institute from 1997 to1999. In 2002 he accepted a position as professor in the Department of Ear, Nose and Throat Disease at Tampere University Hospital where he currently is emeritus professor and works at the hearing and balance research unit.

== Research and publications ==
Pyykkӧ has been awarded numerous research grants and has published more than 500 scientific publications. His research range from surgery to inner ear rehabilitation. He is considered an expert in various areas including: vestibular assessment and management (specifically) Meniere's disease.; He has applied artificial intelligence in inner ear disorders as vertigo and noise-induced hearing loss He was one of the first to imagine endolymphatic hydrops in animal and human with MRI. He established an international consortium to study nanotechnology in hearing science.

Key aspects of EU funded project NANOEAR include targeted drug delivery to the inner ear, investigated using eight different types of nanoparticles, including liposomes, dendrimers, and micelles . These nanocarriers were designed to deliver therapeutic drugs to improve hearing function through neuroprotective agents and gene delivery. The work encompassed the production of nanoparticles engineered to be minimally detectable by the human immune system via PEG-ylation, to achieve efficient cellular uptake through the use of cell‑penetrating tet-peptides, and to enable targeted delivery to spiral ganglion neurons using peptides recognizing BDNF receptors. Additional design features included endosomal escape peptides to facilitate lysosomal escape and nuclear localization strategies exploiting the nuclear pore complex, also mediated by tet-peptides. NANOEAR (2006–2010) was a pioneering project in this field. The project produced early and influential results demonstrating targeted intracellular delivery of therapeutic agents to inner ear cells using nanocarrier‑based systems, which were subsequently published.

He has also evaluated risk factors for falls of the elderly and evaluation of postural stability with force platform. Some studies focused on vestibular schwannoma surgery and Eustachian tube function.
