= Pyykkö =

Pyykkö is a Finnish surname.

== Geographical distribution ==
As of 2014, 93.1% of all known bearers of the surname Pyykkö were residents of Finland (frequency 1:3,358) and 5.8% of Sweden (1:96,537).

In Finland, the frequency of the surname was higher than national average (1:3,358) in the following regions:

1. North Karelia (1:546)
2. Päijänne Tavastia (1:1,822)
3. South Karelia (1:2,474)
4. Lapland (1:2,475)
5. North Ostrobothnia (1:2,622)
6. Southwest Finland (1:2,950)

== People ==
- Pekka Pyykkö (born 1941), Finnish scientist
- Ilmari Pyykkö (born 1944), Finnish otorhinolaryngologist
- Seppo Pyykkö (born 1955), Finnish footballer
