= Endolymphatic sac tumor =

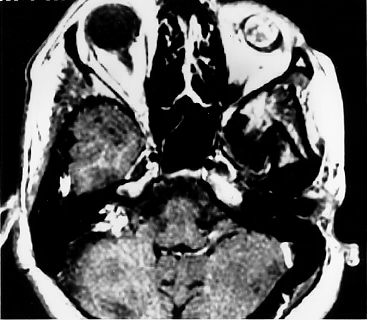
Post contrast T1 weighted MRI demonstrates intense enhancement of both the eye and the endolymphatic sac tumor in patient with VHL.

An endolymphatic sac tumor (ELST) is a very uncommon papillary epithelial neoplasm arising within the endolymphatic sac or endolymphatic duct. This tumor shows a very high association with Von Hippel–Lindau syndrome (VHL).

== Classification ==
The ELST has been referred to as adenocarcinoma of endolymphatic sac, Heffner tumor, papillary adenomatous tumor, aggressive papillary adenoma, invasive papillary cystadenoma, and papillary tumor of temporal bone. However, these names are not encouraged as they do not accurately classify the current understanding of the tumor.

== Signs and symptoms ==
Patients with ELST may present clinically with progressive or fluctuating, one sided sensorineural hearing loss which may mimick Ménière's disease due to the development of tumor associated endolymphatic hydrops. Patients may also experience tinnitus, vertigo, and loss of vestibular function (ataxia). Alternatively, symptom onset may be sudden, due to intralabyrinthine hemorrhage. Patients may also present with other symptoms related to von Hippel–Lindau syndrome in other anatomic sites, which will result in imaging evaluation of the head.

== Imaging findings ==
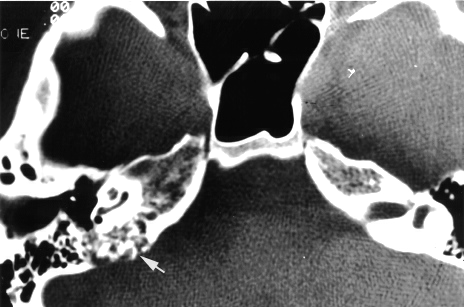
CT in patient with VHL syndrome through the petrous ridge demonstrates bone erosion at the site of the endolymphatic sac tumor, typical of the locally aggressive behavior of this tumor (curved arrow).

Imaging studies help to identify the tumor and the specific anatomic site of involvement. Magnetic resonance images show a hyperintensity (hypervascularity) of a heterogeneous mass by T1 weighted images. Computed tomography shows a multilocular, lytic destructive temporal bone mass, centered on the vestibular aqueduct (between internal auditory canal and sigmoid sinus).

== Pathogenesis ==
The von Hippel–Lindau tumor suppressor gene generally has a germline mutation. This suppressor gene is also called elongin binding protein and G7 protein. The VHL protein is involved in up-regulation of hypoxic response via the [[hypoxia inducible factor [HIF]-1 alpha]]. Mutations generally prevent the production of any functional VHL protein or result in a change of structure of VHL protein. This genetic disorder shows an autosomal dominant inheritance pattern, with about 20% of patients possessing a new mutation. There are usually several other tumors which are part of the syndrome, including tumors of the central nervous system, kidneys, pancreas, adrenal glands, epididymis, broad ligament, along with the endolymphatic sac. The vast majority of patients with an endolymphatic sac tumor have von Hippel-Lindau syndrome.

== Pathology findings ==
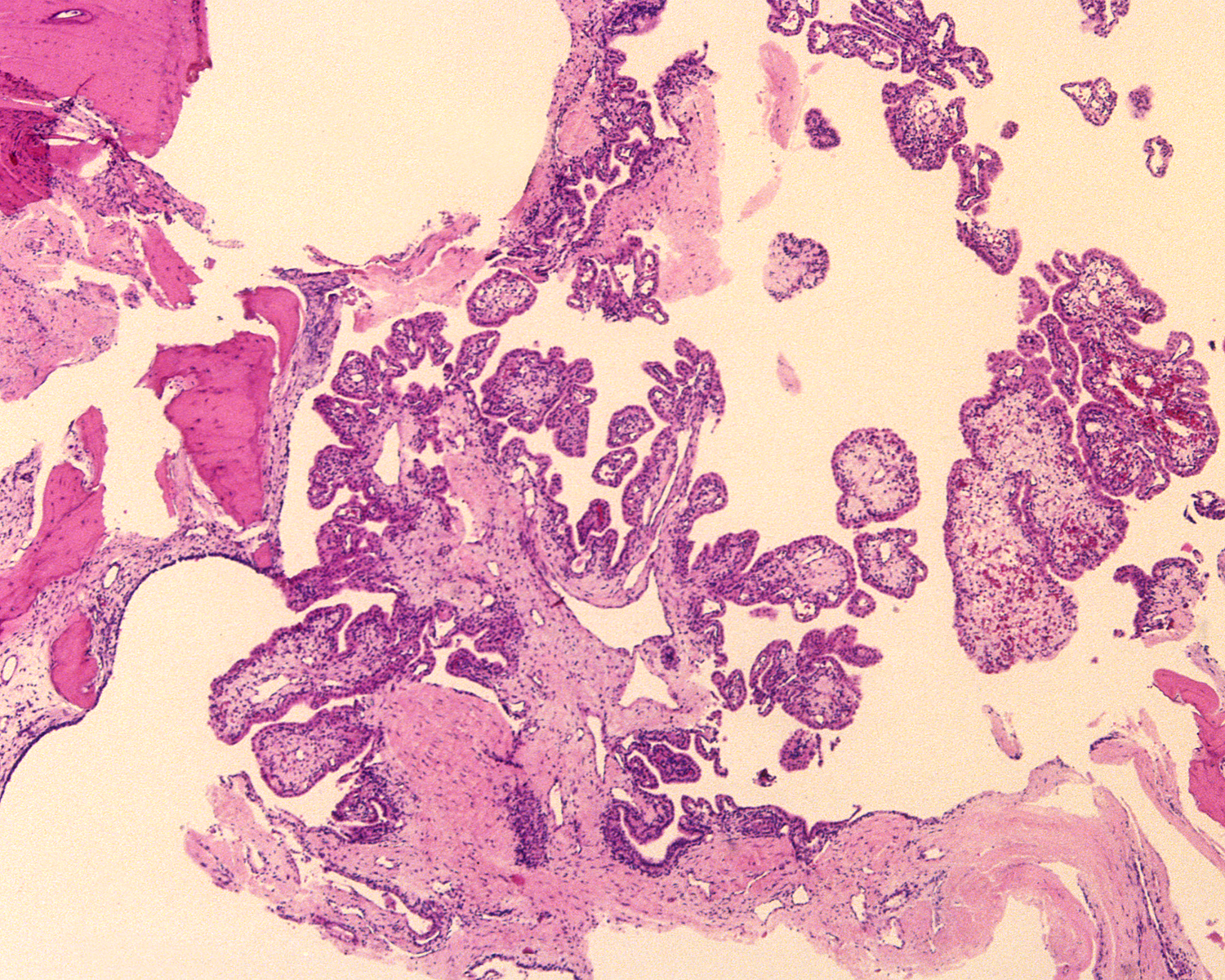
An intermediate power image of an endolymphatic sac tumor with bone (upper left).

Tumors range from several millimeters up to 10 cm, with larger tumors more frequently seen in older patients. If the tumor is bilateral, it is almost always seen in a VHL patient. The tumor destroys the mastoid air spaces and extends into the middle ear and/or posterior cranial fossa.

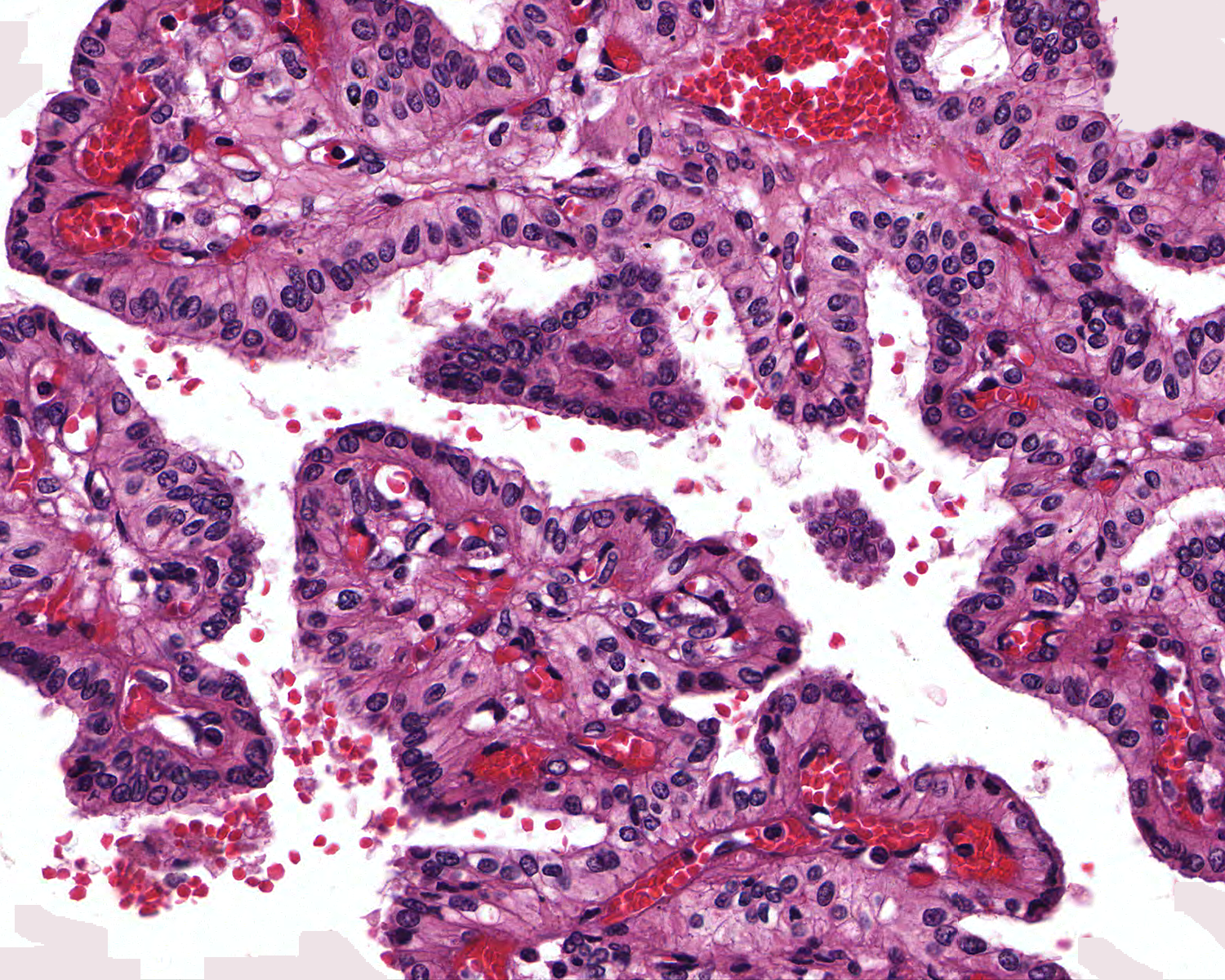
A high power image of an endolymphatic sac tumor showing clear cytoplasm in cuboidal cells lined up along papillae.

The microscopic appearance shows an unencapsulated, destructive growth, remodeling and invading bone. The tumor is arranged as simple, broad, non-complex papillary projections without large cystic spaces. The spaces are often fluid filled, have extravasated erythrocytes and/or inspissated material. The cells are cuboidal, usually single layered along the papillary structures, showing indistinct cell borders. The nuclei are round and hyperchromatic.

=== Immunohistochemistry ===
The neoplastic cells are reactive with keratin, CK7, and Epithelial membrane antigen, but negative with TTF-1 and CK20.

=== Cytogenetics ===
The germline mutations of VHL tumor suppressor gene will be found on 3p25-26 (short arm of chromosome 3), usually between base pair 10,158,318 to 10,168,761.

== Differential diagnosis ==
The clinical and pathology differential are different. From a pathology perspective, an endolymphatic sac tumor needs to be separated from metastatic renal cell carcinoma, metastatic thyroid papillary carcinoma, middle ear adenoma, paraganglioma, choroid plexus papilloma, middle ear adenocarcinoma, and ceruminous adenoma.

== Management ==
Wide excision is the treatment of choice, although attempting to preserve hearing. Based on the anatomic site, it is difficult to completely remove, and so while there is a good prognosis, recurrences or persistence may be seen. There is no metastatic potential. Patients who succumb to the disease, usually do so because of other tumors within the von Hippel-Lindau complex rather than from this tumor. Surgery is the primary treatment modality, but in some rare instances adjuvant radiation therapy may be used.

== Epidemiology ==
This is a very rare tumor, since only about 1 in 35,000 to 40,000 people have VHL, of whom about 10% have endolymphatic sac tumors. Patients usually present in the 4th to 5th decades without an gender predilection. The tumor involves the endolymphatic sac, a portion of the intraosseous inner ear of the posterior petrous bone.
