= Vestibular system =

Sensory system that facilitates body balance

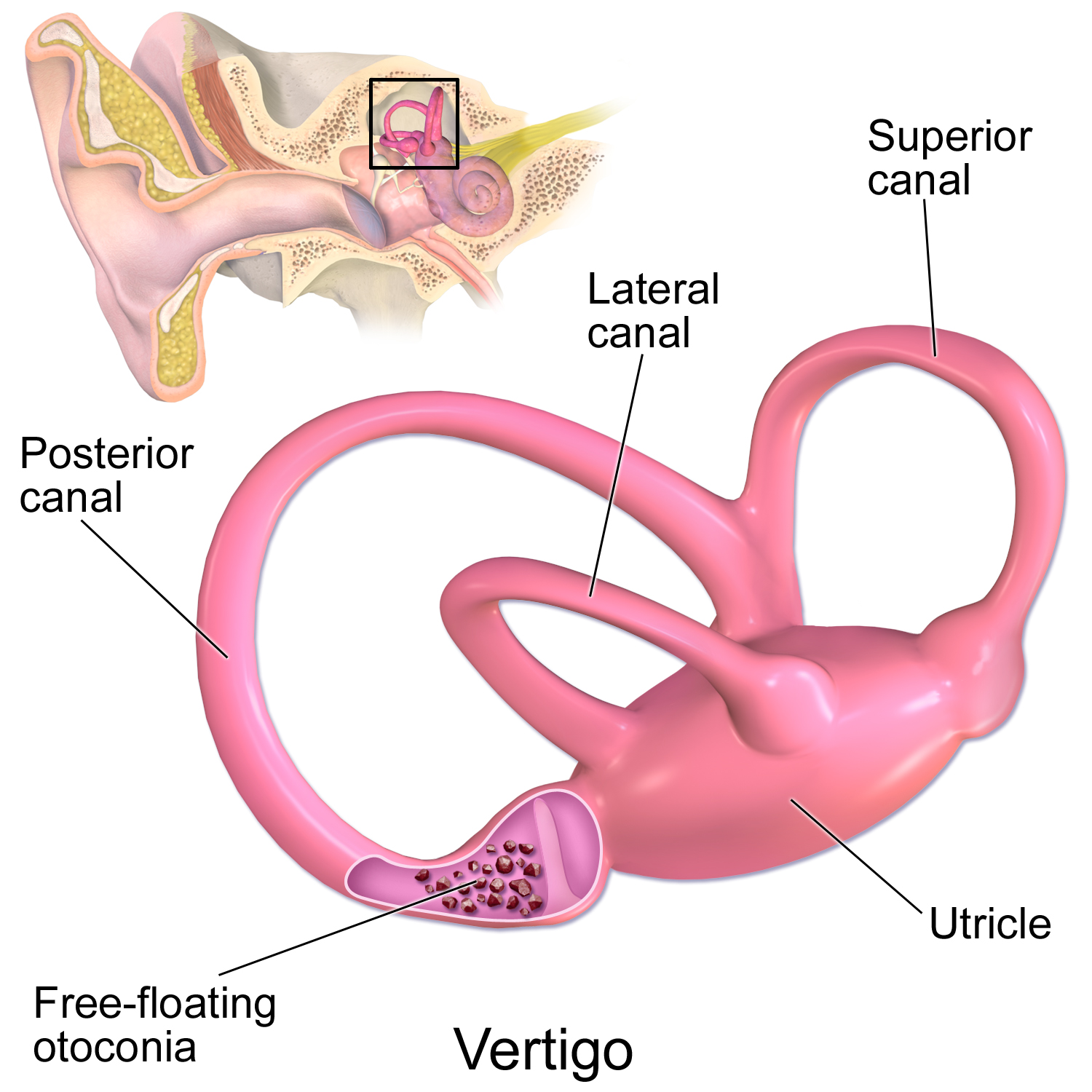
Human vestibular system of the semicircular canals in the inner ear

The vestibular system, in vertebrates, is a sensory system that creates the sense of balance and spatial orientation for the function of coordinating movement with balance. Together with the cochlea, a part of the auditory system, it constitutes the labyrinth of the inner ear in most mammals.

As movements consist of rotations and translations, the vestibular system comprises two components: the semicircular canals, which indicate rotational movements; and the otoliths, which indicate linear accelerations. The vestibular system sends signals primarily to the neural structures that control eye movement; these provide the anatomical basis of the vestibulo-ocular reflex, which is required for clear vision. Signals are also sent to the muscles that keep an animal upright and in general control posture; these provide the anatomical means required to enable an animal to maintain its desired position in space.

The brain uses information from the vestibular system in the head, and from proprioception throughout the body to enable an understanding of the body's dynamics and kinematics (including its position and acceleration) from moment to moment. How these two perceptive sources are integrated to provide the underlying structure of the sensorium is unknown.

== Semicircular canal system ==
Cochlea and vestibular system

The semicircular canal system detects rotational movements. Semicircular canals are its main tools to achieve this detection.

=== Structure ===
Since the world is three-dimensional, the vestibular system contains three semicircular canals in each labyrinth. They are approximately orthogonal (at right angles) to each other, and are the horizontal (or lateral), anterior (or superior), and posterior (or inferior) semicircular canals. Anterior and posterior canals may collectively be called vertical semicircular canals.

1. Movement of fluid within the horizontal semicircular canal corresponds to rotation of the head around a vertical axis (i.e. the neck), as when doing a pirouette.
2. The anterior and posterior semicircular canals detect rotations of the head in the sagittal plane (as when nodding), and in the frontal plane, as when cartwheeling. Both anterior and posterior canals are oriented at approximately 45° between frontal and sagittal planes.

The movement of fluid pushes on a structure called the cupula which contains hair cells that transduce the mechanical movement to electrical signals.

=== Push-pull systems ===
Push-pull system of the semicircular canals, for a horizontal head movement to the right.

The canals are arranged in such a way that each canal on the left side has an almost parallel counterpart on the right side. Each of these three pairs works in a push-pull fashion: when one canal is stimulated, its corresponding partner on the other side is inhibited, and vice versa.

This push-pull system makes it possible to sense all directions of rotation: while the right horizontal canal gets stimulated during head rotations to the right (Fig 2), the left horizontal canal gets stimulated (and thus predominantly signals) by head rotations to the left.

Vertical canals are coupled in a crossed fashion, i.e. stimulations that are excitatory for an anterior canal are also inhibitory for the contralateral posterior, and vice versa.

=== Vestibulo-ocular reflex ===
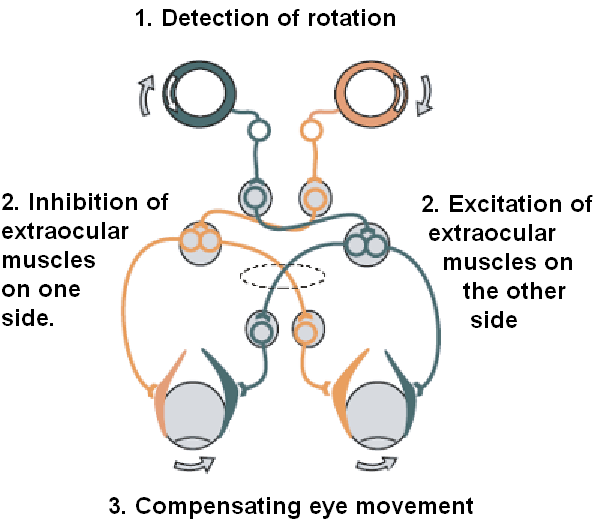
The vestibulo-ocular reflex. A rotation of the head is detected, which triggers an inhibitory signal to the extraocular muscles on one side and an excitatory signal to the muscles on the other side. The result is a compensatory movement of the eyes.

The vestibular-ocular reflex is a reflex eye movement that stabilizes images on the retina during head movement by producing an eye movement in the direction opposite to head movement, thus preserving the image on the center of the visual field. For example, when the head moves to the right, the eyes move to the left, and vice versa. Since slight head movements are present all the time, the vestibulo-ocular reflex is very important for stabilizing vision: patients whose vestibulo-ocular reflex is impaired find it difficult to read because they cannot stabilize the eyes during small head tremors. The vestibulo-ocular reflex does not depend on visual input and works even in total darkness or when the eyes are closed.

This reflex, combined with the push-pull principle described above, forms the physiological basis of the Rapid head impulse test or Halmagyi-Curthoys-test, in which the head is rapidly and forcefully moved to the side while observing whether the eyes keep looking in the same direction.

=== Mechanics ===
The mechanics of the semicircular canals can be described by a damped oscillator. If we designate the deflection of the cupula with $\theta$, and the head velocity with $\dot q$, the cupula deflection is approximately

$$\theta (s) = \frac{\alpha s}{(T_1 s+1)(T_2 s+1)} \dot{q} (s)$$

α is a proportionality factor, and s corresponds to the frequency. For fluid simulations, the endolymph has roughly the same density and viscosity as water. The cupula has the same density as endolymph, and it is a jelly mostly made of polysaccharides with Young's modulus $5.4\; \mathrm{Pa}$.

T_{1} is the characteristic time required for the cupula to accelerate until it reaches terminal velocity, and T_{2} is the characteristic time required for the cupula to relax back to neutral position. The cupula has a small inertia compared to the elastic force (due to the jelly) and the viscous force (due to the endolymph), so T_{1} is very small compared to T_{2}. For humans, the time constants T_{1} and T_{2} are approximately 5 ms and 20 s, respectively. As a result, for typical head movements, which cover the frequency range of 0.1 Hz and 10 Hz, the deflection of the cupula is approximately proportional to the head velocity. This is very useful since the velocity of the eyes must be opposite to the velocity of the head to maintain clear vision.

=== Central processing ===
Signals from the vestibular system also project to the cerebellum (where they are used to keep the VOR effective, a task usually referred to as learning or adaptation) and to different areas in the cortex. The projections to the cortex are spread out over different areas, and their implications are not clearly understood.

=== Projection pathways ===
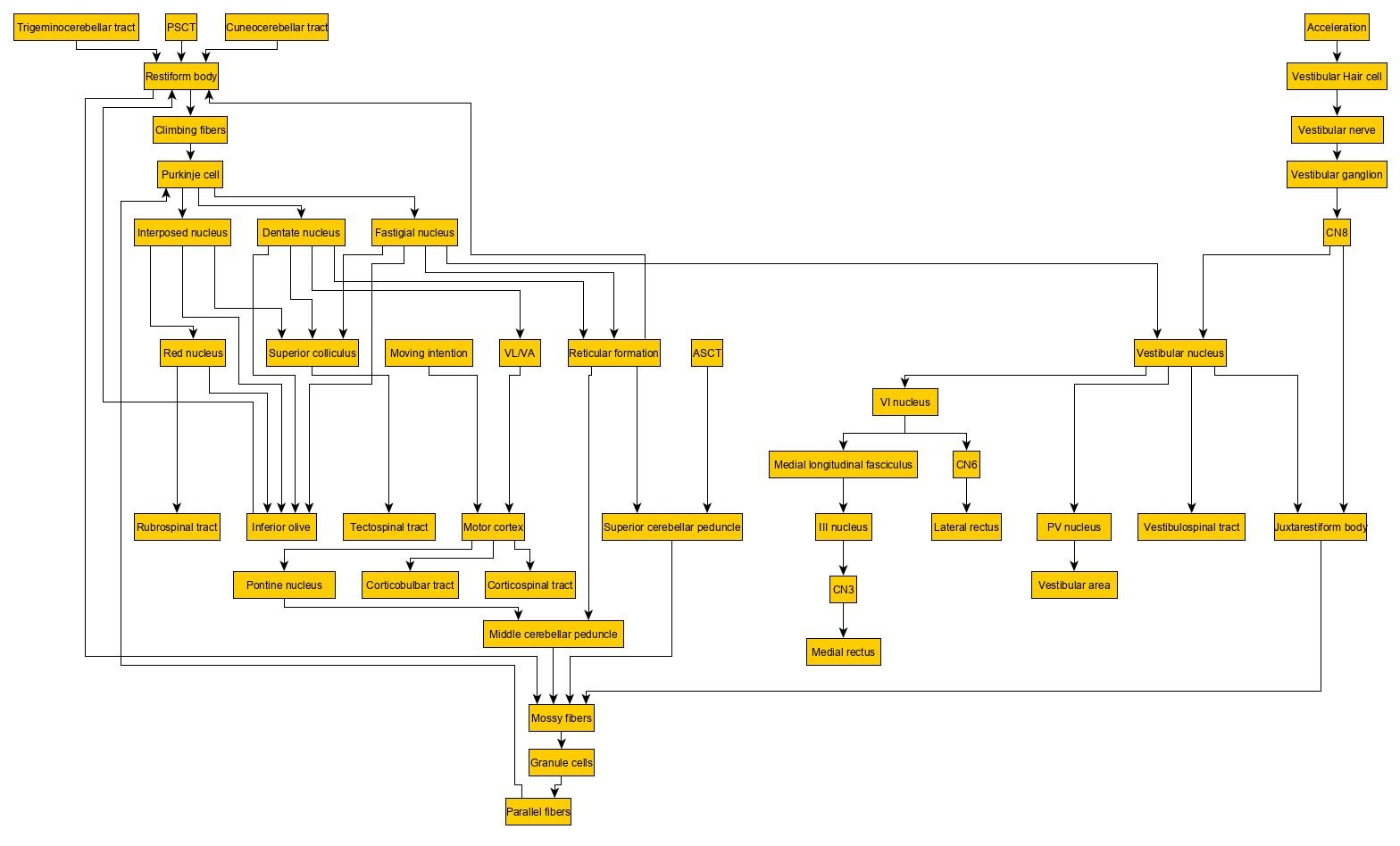
Neural pathway of the vestibular system

The vestibular nuclei on either side of the brainstem exchange signals regarding movement and body position. These signals are sent down the following projection pathways.

1. To the cerebellum. Signals sent to the cerebellum are relayed back as muscle movements of the head, eyes, and posture.
2. To nuclei of cranial nerves III, IV, and VI. Signals sent to these nerves cause the vestibular-ocular reflex. They allow the eyes to fix on a moving object while staying in focus.
3. To the reticular formation. Signals sent to the reticular formation signal the new posture the body has taken on, and how to adjust circulation and breathing due to body position.
4. To the spinal cord. Signals sent to the spinal cord allow quick reflex reactions to both the limbs and trunk to regain balance.
5. To the thalamus. Signals sent to the thalamus allow for head and body motor control as well as being conscious of body position.

== Otolithic organs ==
While the semicircular canals respond to rotations, the otolithic organs sense linear accelerations. Humans have two otolithic organs on each side, one called the utricle, the other called the saccule. The utricle contains a patch of hair cells and supporting cells called a macula. Similarly, the saccule contains a patch of hair cells and a macula. Each hair cell of a macula has forty to seventy stereocilia and one true cilium called a kinocilium. The tips of these cilia are embedded in an otolithic membrane. This membrane is weighted down with protein-calcium carbonate granules called otoconia. These otoconia add to the weight and inertia of the membrane and enhance the sense of gravity and motion. With the head erect, the otolithic membrane bears directly down on the hair cells and stimulation is minimal. However, when the head is tilted, the otolithic membrane sags and bends the stereocilia, stimulating the hair cells. Any orientation of the head causes a combination of stimulation to the utricles and saccules of the two ears. The brain interprets head orientation by comparing these inputs to each other and other input from the eyes and stretch receptors in the neck, thereby detecting whether the head is tilted or the entire body is tipping. Essentially, these otolithic organs sense how quickly you are accelerating forward or backward, left or right, or up or down. Most of the utricular signals elicit eye movements, while the majority of the saccular signals projects to muscles that control our posture.

While the interpretation of the rotation signals from the semicircular canals is straightforward, the interpretation of otolith signals is more difficult: since gravity is equivalent to constant linear acceleration, one somehow has to distinguish otolith signals that are caused by linear movements from those caused by gravity. Humans can do that quite well, but the neural mechanisms underlying this separation are not yet fully understood. Humans can sense head tilting and linear acceleration even in dark environments because of the orientation of two groups of hair cell bundles on either side of the striola. Hair cells on opposite sides move with mirror symmetry, so when one side is moved, the other is inhibited. The opposing effects caused by a tilt of the head cause differential sensory inputs from the hair cell bundles allowing humans to tell which way the head is tilting. Sensory information is then sent to the brain, which can respond with appropriate corrective actions to the nervous and muscular systems to ensure that balance and awareness are maintained.

== Experience from the vestibular system ==
Experience from the vestibular system is called equilibrioception. It is mainly used for the sense of balance and for spatial orientation. When the vestibular system is stimulated without any other inputs, one experiences a sense of self-motion. For example, a person in complete darkness and sitting in a chair will sense that they have turned to the left if the chair is turned to the left. A person in an elevator, with essentially constant visual input, will sense they are descending as the elevator starts to descend. There are a variety of direct and indirect vestibular stimuli which can make people sense they are moving when they are not, not moving when they are, tilted when they are not, or not tilted when they are. Although the vestibular system is a very fast sense used to generate reflexes, including the righting reflex, to maintain perceptual and postural stability, compared to the other senses of vision, touch and audition, vestibular input is perceived with delay.

== Pathologies ==
Diseases of the vestibular system can take different forms and usually induce vertigo and instability or loss of balance, often accompanied by nausea. The most common vestibular diseases in humans are vestibular neuritis, a related condition called labyrinthitis, Ménière's disease, and BPPV. In addition, the vestibular system's function can be affected by tumours on the vestibulocochlear nerve, an infarct in the brain stem or in cortical regions related to the processing of vestibular signals, and cerebellar atrophy.

Thinning or loss (dehiscence) of part of the bony casing of the canals, usually at the top of the superior canal, leads to semicircular canal dehiscence syndrome, sometimes leading to sound-induced vertigo or unusual symptoms such as hearing one's eyeballs moving.

When the vestibular system and the visual system deliver incongruous results, nausea often occurs. When the vestibular system reports movement but the visual system reports no movement, the motion disorientation is often called motion sickness (or seasickness, car sickness, simulation sickness, or airsickness). In the opposite case, such as when a person is in a zero-gravity environment or during a virtual reality session, the disoriented sensation is often called space sickness or space adaptation syndrome. Either of these "sicknesses" usually cease once the congruity between the two systems is restored.

Alcohol can also cause alterations in the vestibular system for short periods and will result in vertigo and possibly nystagmus due to the variable viscosity of the blood and the endolymph during the consumption of alcohol. The term for this is positional alcohol nystagmus (PAN):

1. PAN I - The alcohol concentration is higher in the blood than in the vestibular system, hence the endolymph is relatively dense.
2. PAN II - The alcohol concentration is lower in the blood than in the vestibular system, hence the endolymph is relatively dilute.

PAN I will result in subjective vertigo in one direction and typically occurs shortly after ingestion of alcohol when blood alcohol levels are highest. PAN II will eventually cause subjective vertigo in the opposite direction. This occurs several hours after ingestion and after a relative reduction in blood alcohol levels.

Benign paroxysmal positional vertigo (BPPV) is a condition resulting in acute symptoms of vertigo. It is probably caused when pieces that have broken off otoliths have slipped into one of the semicircular canals. In most cases, it is the posterior canal that is affected. In certain head positions, these particles shift and create a fluid wave which displaces the cupula of the canal affected, which leads to dizziness, vertigo and nystagmus.

A similar condition to BPPV may occur in dogs and other mammals, but the term vertigo cannot be applied because it refers to subjective perception. Terminology is not standardized for this condition.

A common vestibular pathology of dogs and cats is colloquially known as "old dog vestibular disease", or more formally idiopathic peripheral vestibular disease, which causes a sudden episode of loss of balance, circling head tilt, and other signs. This condition is very rare in young dogs but fairly common in geriatric animals, and may affect cats of any age.

Vestibular dysfunction has also been found to correlate with cognitive and emotional disorders, including depersonalization and derealization.

== Vertebrates ==
Though humans as well as most other vertebrates exhibit three semicircular canals in their vestibular systems, lampreys and hagfish are vertebrates that deviate from this trend. The vestibular systems of lampreys contain two semicircular canals while those of hagfish contain a single canal. The lamprey's two canals are developmentally similar to the anterior and posterior canals found in humans. The single canal found in hagfish appears to be secondarily derived.

Additionally, the vestibular systems of lampreys and hagfish differ from those found in other vertebrates in that the otolithic organs of lampreys and hagfish are not segmented like the utricle and saccule found in humans, but rather form one continuous structure referred to as the macula communis.

Birds possess a second vestibular organ in the back, the lumbosacral canals. Behavioral evidence suggests that this system is responsible for stabilizing the body during walking and standing.

== Invertebrates ==
Invertebrates have different dedicated sensory systems for sensing gravitational and rotational accelerations. Many detect the direction of gravity through statocysts, a class of receptor that consist of one more more stone-like statoliths within a fluid-filled compartment lined by sensory hairs (ciliated cells or cuticular hairs) that signal when they are deflected by the statolith. Coleoid cephalopods and some decapod crustaceans have elaborated statocysts that allow them to detect angular accelerations, analogous to the vertebrate semicircular canals.

Insects can sense gravity with a mechanosensory structure called the Johnston’s organ within their antennae. Some sensory neurons in the Johnston’s organ respond to slow deflections by gravity or wind while distinct sets respond to high-frequency sound waves. For sensing rotational accelerations during flight, flying insects use wing sensors or, in the case of flies (Diptera), a modified hindwing called a haltere. Campaniform sensilla on the wings and halteres transduce Coriolis forces experienced during the wingstroke for rapid flight control.

== See also ==
- Dark cell
- Migraine-associated vertigo
- Statocyst
- List of distinct cell types in the adult human body
- Inertial Measurement Unit – Electro-mechanical system that provides similar functionality to aircraft, rockets, ships and other human-made devices
