= Migraine-associated vertigo =

- Other names: Migraine-associated vertigo (MAV), Migrainous vertigo, Migraine-related vestibulopathy.
- Specialty: Neurology
- Frequency: 0.98%

Vestibular migraine (VM) is vertigo with migraine, either as a symptom of migraine or as a related neurological disorder.

A 2010 report from the University of British Columbia published in the journal Headache said that "'Migraine associated vertigo' is emerging as a popular diagnosis for patients with recurrent vertigo" but, "in contrast to basilar artery migraine, is neither clinically nor biologically plausible as a migraine variant." Epidemiological studies indicate a strong link between vertigo and migraine.

== Signs and symptoms ==
Vertigo is a medically recognized term for the symptom of a vestibular system disturbance. It refers to a sense of false motion, the sense that motion is happening around the person when, objectively, it is not. It may include a feeling of rotation or illusory sensations of motion or both. The general term dizziness is used by nonmedical people for those symptoms but often refers to a feeling of light-headedness, giddiness, drowsiness, or faintness, all of which must be differentiated from true vertigo, since the latter symptoms might have other causes.

Motion sickness occurs more frequently in migraine patients (30–50% more than in controls). Benign paroxysmal vertigo of childhood is an example of migraine-associated vertigo in which headache does not often occur. Basilar artery migraine (BAM) consists of two or more symptoms (vertigo, tinnitus, decreased hearing, ataxia, dysarthria, visual symptoms in both hemifields or both eyes, diplopia, bilateral paresthesias, paresis, decreased consciousness and/or loss of consciousness) followed by throbbing headache. Auditory symptoms are rare. However, a study showed a fluctuating low-tone sensorineural hearing loss in more than 50% of patients with BAM, with a noticeable change in hearing just before the onset of a migraine headache. Vertigo attacks are usually concurrent with a headache, and the family history is usually positive. The diagnostician must rule out: transient ischemic attack (TIA), and paroxysmal vestibular disorder accompanied by headache.

There is also a familial vestibulopathy, familial benign recurrent vertigo (fBRV), where episodes of vertigo occur with or without a migraine headache. Testing may show profound vestibular loss. The syndrome responds to acetazolamide. Familial hemiplegic migraine (FHM) has been linked to mutations in the calcium channel gene. (Ophoff et al. 1966 cf. Lempert et al.)

== Pathophysiology ==
The pathophysiology of MAV is not completely understood; both central and peripheral defects have been observed.

== Diagnosis ==
By the Consensus document of the Barány Society and the International Headache Society on the diagnostic criteria of vestibular migraine, the diagnostic criteria of vestibular migraine are:

1. At least 5 episodes with vestibular symptoms of moderate or severe intensity, lasting 5 minutes to 72 hours
2. Current or previous history of migraine with or without aura according to the International Classification of Headache Disorders (ICHD)
3. One or more migraine features with at least 50% of the vestibular episodes:
  - headache with at least two of the following characteristics: one-sided location, pulsating quality, moderate or severe pain intensity, aggravation by routine physical activity
  - photophobia and phonophobia
  - visual aura
4. Not better accounted for by another vestibular or ICHD diagnosis

The diagnostic criteria of probable vestibular migraine are:

1. At least 5 episodes with vestibular symptoms of moderate or severe intensity, lasting 5 minutes to 72 hours
2. Only one of the criteria B and C for vestibular migraine is fulfilled (migraine history or migraine features during the episode)
3. Not better accounted for by another vestibular or ICHD diagnosis

=== Classification ===
Benign paroxysmal positional vertigo
Migraine is commonly associated with BPPV, the most common vestibular disorder in patients presenting with dizziness. The two may be linked by genetic factors or by vascular damage to the labyrinth.
Ménière's disease
There is an increased prevalence of migraine in patients with Ménière's disease, and migraine leads to a greater susceptibility to developing Ménière’s disease. But they can be distinguished. Ménière's disease may go on for days or even years, while migraines typically do not last longer than 24 hours.
Motion sickness
More prevalent in patients with migraine.
Psychiatric syndromes
Dizziness and spinning vertigo are the second most common symptoms of panic attacks, and they can also present as a symptom of major depression. Migraine is a risk factor for developing major depression and panic disorder, and vice versa.

== Treatment ==
Treatment of migraine-associated vertigo is the same as the treatment for migraine in general. This includes lifestyle modifications such as dietary adjustments, as well as using pharmaceuticals. The typical medications used include antidepressants, anticonvulsants and antihypertensives. There is not enough evidence to indicate which medications are most effective for preventing vestibular migraine.

== Epidemiology ==
The prevalence of migraine and vertigo is 1.6 times higher in 200 dizziness clinic patients than in 200 age- and sex-matched controls from an orthopaedic clinic. Among the patients with unclassified or idiopathic vertigo, the prevalence of migraine was shown to be elevated. In another study, migraine patients reported 2.5 times more vertigo and also 2.5 times more dizzy spells during headache-free periods than the controls.

MAV may occur at any age, with a female: male ratio of between 1.5 and 5:1. Familial occurrence is not uncommon. In most patients, migraine headaches begin earlier in life than MAV, with years of headache-free periods before MAV manifests.

In a diary study, the 1-month prevalence of MAV was 16%, the frequency of MAV was higher, and the duration was longer on days with headache, and MAV was a risk factor for co-morbid anxiety.
