= Endolymphatic sac =

Blind pouch in the inner ear

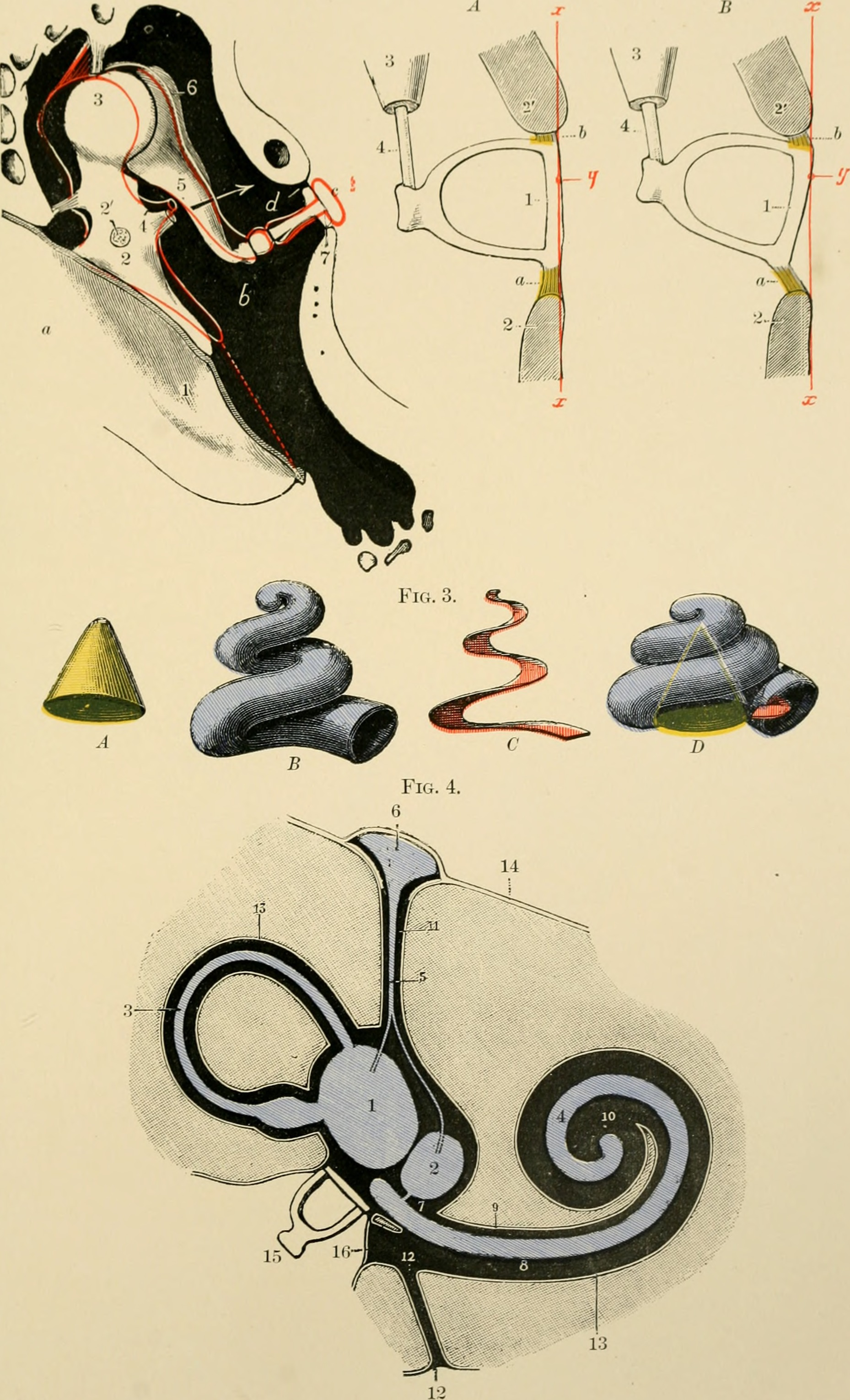
- Endolymphatic sac appears as #6 in Fig 4

Details

Identifiers
- Latin: saccus endolymphaticus
- MeSH: D004712
- TA98: A15.3.03.080
- TA2: 7007
- FMA: 75639

In anatomy, the endolymphatic sac is a structure in the inner ear. It is a dead end pouch located at the end of the endolymphatic duct, on the posterior surface of the petrous portion of the temporal bone, where it is in contact with the dura mater.

Neoplasms of the endolymphatic sac are very rare tumors.

== Comparative anatomy ==
The duct opens directly to the outside environment in primitive galeaspids, all osteostracans, all placoderms, and most chondrichthyans, so there is no sac. In other vertebrates, the duct arises from the junction between the saccule and the utricle, and goes dorsomedially through a hole (foramen endolymphaticum) before terminating with a sac on the posterior surface of the temporal bone. The sacs in most vertebrates are small and contained within the braincase.

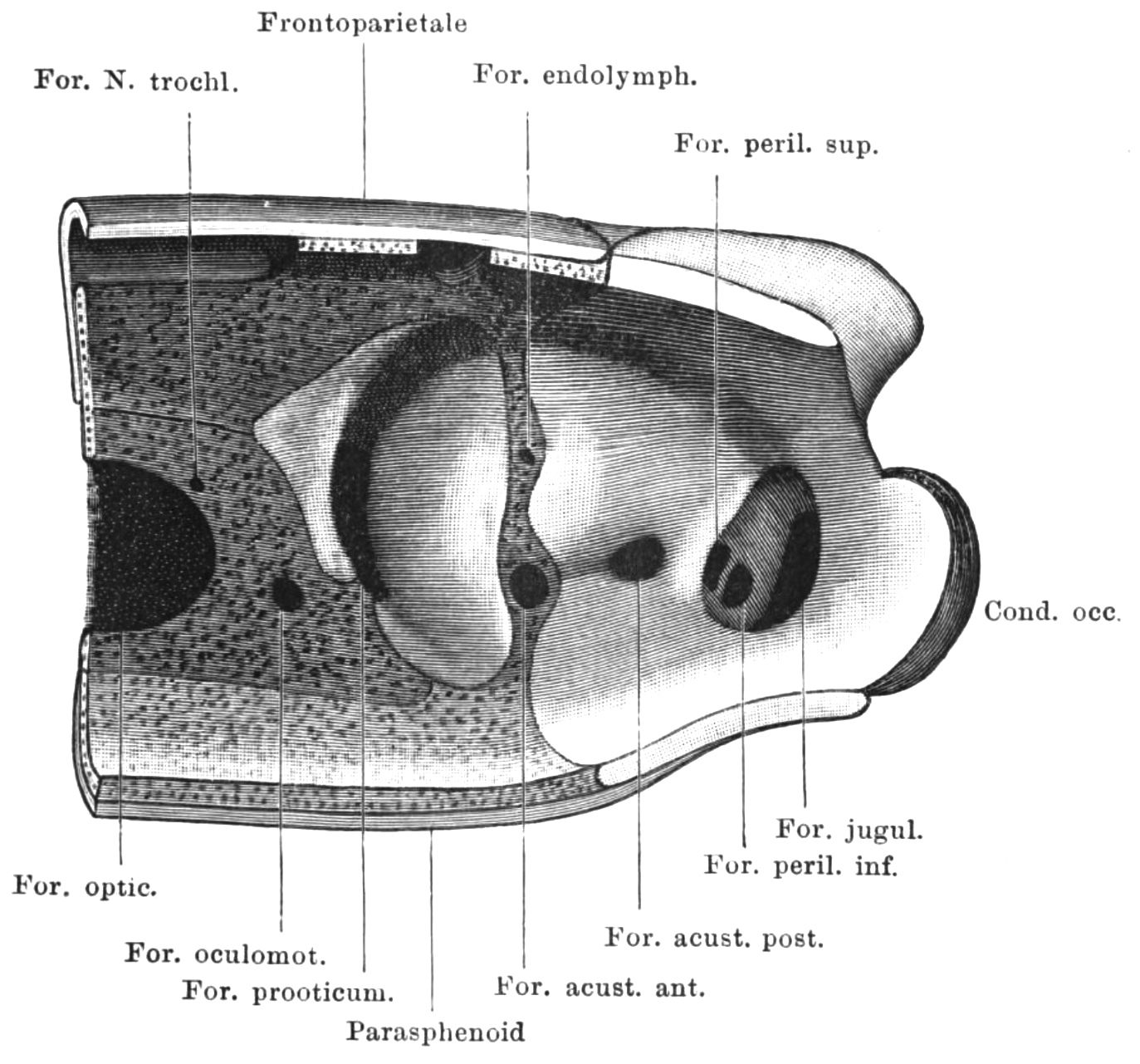
Medial wall of the right bony labyrinth of Rana esculenta, seen from the cranial cavity. The foramen endolymphaticum is seen at "for. endolymph.".

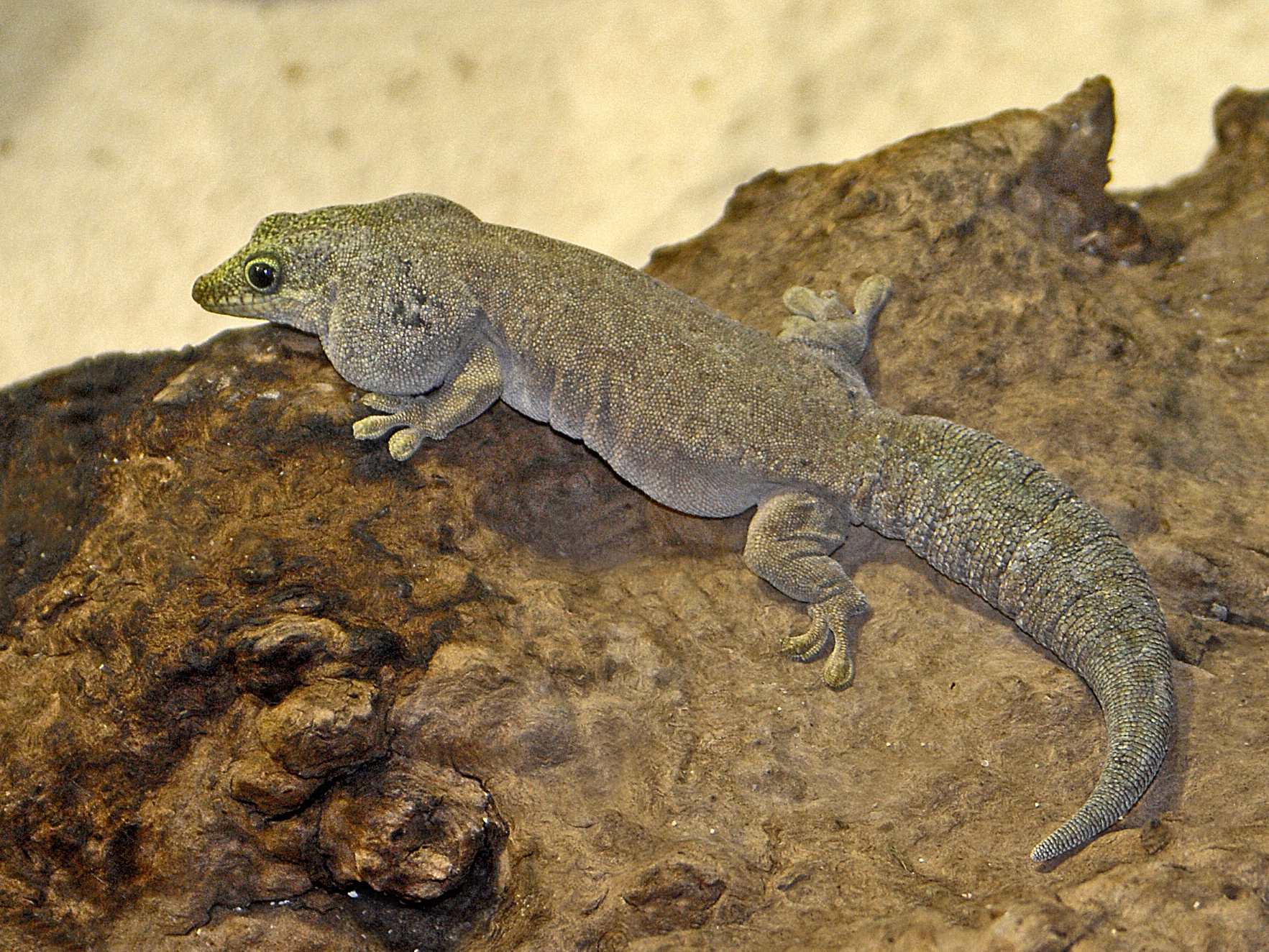
A prominent pair of endolymphatic sacs full of calcium carbonate in Standing's day gecko.

In the cyclostomes, the sac is filled with poorly crystalline apatite (calcium phosphate). In all other vertebrates it is either empty or contains calcium carbonate. In bony fish, reptiles and especially amphibians, the endolymphatic sac is large and distended with crystals of calcium carbonate, which are also called chalk or lime. The otoliths are made of calcium carbonate, too.

The sac is close to the surface in Squalus, Scyliorhinus, and Chimaera, such that calcium carbonate crystals extruded to the surface if the skin is pressed on the sac. In chondrichthyans and teleosts, it contains crystal calcium carbonate. In lungfishes, it is well developed, with many diverticuli filled with calcareous matter.

The frogs have particularly large sacs. They are lengthened towards the tail end, penetrate the spinal canal, often along the entire length of the spinal cord. The whole system is filled with crystals of aragonite, causing the sac to protrude between the intervertebral foramens, creating lime sacs which overlie the spinal ganglia of the adult frog. For some frogs, such as the agile frog, the sacs are only prominent while tadpole, and are absorbed completely as it matures. The lime sacs are considerably less well developed in Urodela and Apoda and are mostly empty. It is a chain of vesicles of different sizes, lined with a single-layered epithelium of variable height; such vesicles are in close contact with a rich capillaries network.

See also the plates of (Simkiss 1967) for illustrations of the sac in lizards and tadpoles.

=== Function ===
In amphibians, the calcium carbonate functions as calcium regulation in metabolism, and for acid–base homeostasis as basic buffer. The amount of calcium carbonate in the sacs is affected by parathyroid hormone, vitamin D3, and calcitonin. If a frog is placed in water containing a high amount of carbon dioxide, but not so high as to suffocate it, the calcareous material in the endolymphatic sacs can be dissolved within ~18 days, but the statoliths remain completely unaffected. If a Rana esculenta is forced to stay underwater for several hours, the calcium level of the blood would rise by 1.6–13.1%, presumably because some of the calcium carbonate of the endolymphatic deposits has been dissolved to balance out the acidity due to anaerobic respiration. If the frog has access to calcium or strontium salts, it can rapidly replenish the sac.

To aid calcium regulation, carbonic anhydrase exists in the labyrinthine walls. In mammals, it is particularly concentrated in the endolymphatic sac and cochlea.

In most mammals, birds, and reptiles, the sacs are small and may contain calcareous matter during embryonic development, but is reabsorbed in the adult. Such embryonic deposits were observed in 1841 in Coluber natrix, and it is also observed in Anguis fragilis, Lacerta viridis, Chelonia mydas, Testudo graeca, and Crocodylus. In adult reptiles, the sacs are small except in gekkonids and iguanids. In these species the sacs extend into the skull and contain much calcareous matter. They become especially large in female individuals, and become depleted shortly before oviposition, when the eggs are fully formed with a calcified eggshell. In birds, this function of the sac is replaced by the medullary bone.

In humans, studies suggest that the endolymphatic duct and endolymphatic sac perform functions absorptive, secretory, phagocytic, and immunodefensive. Supporting evidence:

- contrast agent uptake in the endolymphatic sac and duct in MRI is inversely correlated to endolymphatic hydrops,
- endolymphatic sac and duct morphology changes have been observed in Meniere's Disease.
