= Motion sickness =

Nausea caused by motion or perceived motion

- Other names: Kinetosis, travel sickness, mal de mer, seasickness, airsickness, carsickness, simulation sickness, space motion sickness, space adaptation syndrome
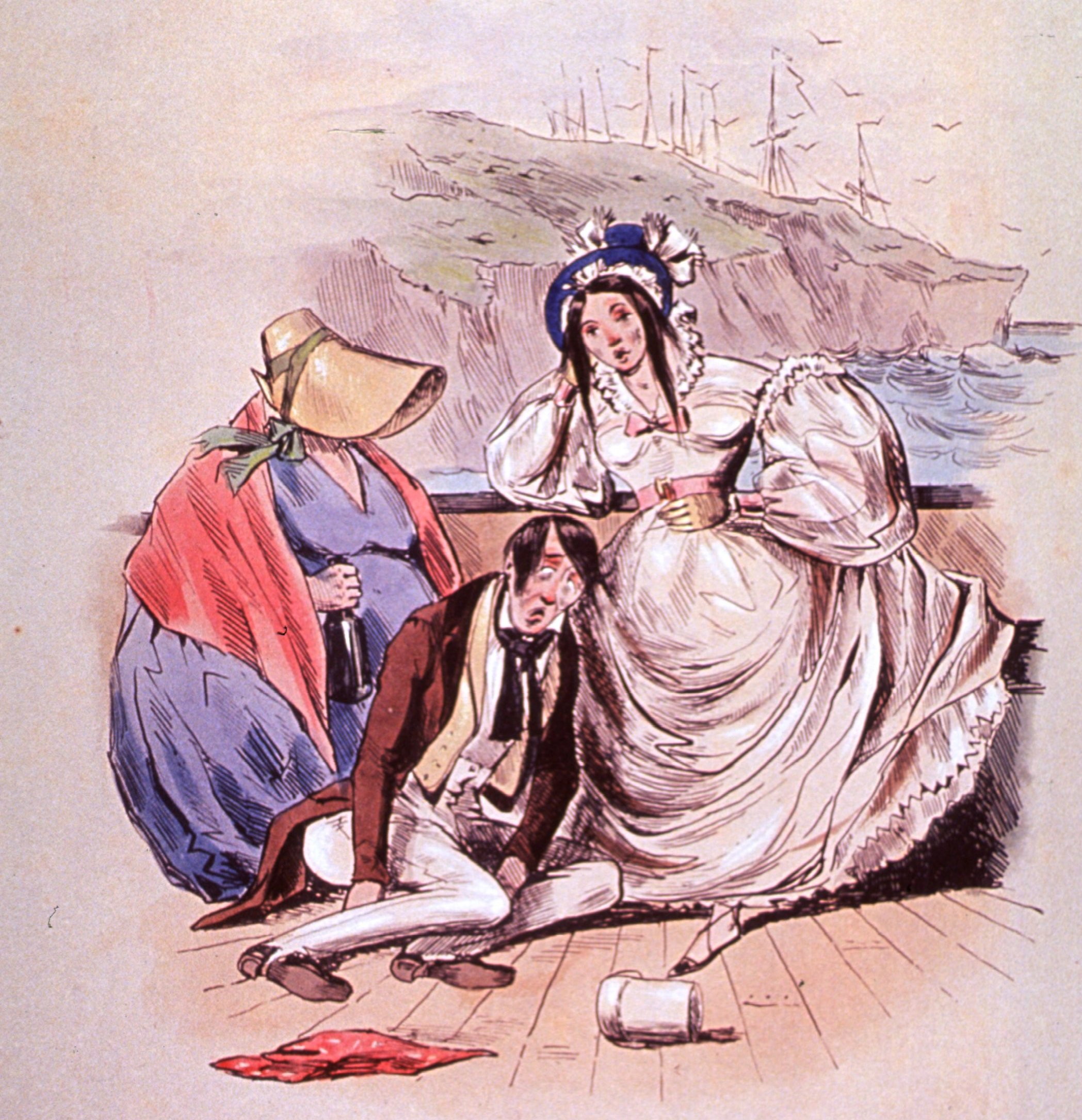
- 1841 G.S. Tregear illustration of people with seasickness
- Specialty: Neurology
- Symptoms: Nausea, vomiting, cold sweat, increased salivation
- Complications: Dehydration, electrolyte problems, lower esophageal tear
- Causes: Real or perceived motion
- Risk factors: Pregnancy, migraines, Ménière's disease
- Diagnostic method: Based on symptoms
- Differential diagnosis: Benign paroxysmal positional vertigo, vestibular migraine, stroke
- Prevention: Avoidance of triggers
- Treatment: Behavioral measures, medications
- Medication: Scopolamine, dimenhydrinate, dexamphetamine
- Prognosis: Generally resolve within a day
- Frequency: Nearly all people with sufficient motion; roughly one-third highly susceptible

Motion sickness occurs due to a difference between actual and expected motion. Symptoms commonly include nausea, vomiting, cold sweat, headache, dizziness, tiredness, loss of appetite, and increased salivation. Complications may rarely include dehydration, electrolyte problems, or a lower esophageal tear.

The cause of motion sickness is either real or perceived motion. This may include car travel, air travel, sea travel, space travel, or reality simulation. Risk factors include pregnancy, migraines, and Ménière's disease. The diagnosis is based on symptoms.

Treatment may include behavioral measures or medications. Behavioral measures include keeping the head still and focusing on the horizon. Three types of medications are useful: antimuscarinics such as scopolamine, H_{1} antihistamines such as dimenhydrinate, and amphetamines such as dexamphetamine. Side effects, however, may limit the use of medications. A number of medications used for nausea (antiemetics) such as ondansetron are not effective for motion sickness.

Many people can be affected with sufficient motion and nearly everyone will experience motion sickness at least once in their lifetime. Susceptibility, however, is variable, with about one-third of the population being susceptible while other people can be affected only under very extreme conditions. Women can be more easily affected than men. Motion sickness has been described since at least the time of Homer (c. eighth century BC).

== Signs and symptoms ==
Signs and symptoms commonly include nausea, vomiting, cold sweat, headache, dizziness, tiredness, loss of appetite, and increased salivation. Occasionally, tiredness can last for hours to days after an episode of motion sickness, known as "sopite syndrome". Rarely severe symptoms such as the inability to walk, ongoing vomiting, or social isolation may occur while rare complications may include dehydration, electrolyte problems, or a lower esophageal tear from severe vomiting.

== Cause ==
Motion sickness can be divided into three categories:

1. Motion sickness caused by motion that is felt but not seen
2. Motion sickness caused by motion that is seen but not felt
3. Motion sickness that occurs when both systems detect motion, but they do not correspond

=== Motion felt but not seen ===
In these cases, motion is sensed by the vestibular system and hence the motion is felt, but no motion or little motion is detected by the visual system.

==== Carsickness ====
Carsickness is quite common and may be caused by reading a map, a book, or a small screen during travel. If someone is looking at a stationary object within a moving vehicle, such as a magazine, their eyes will inform their brain that what they are viewing is not moving. Their inner ears, however, will contradict this by sensing the motion of the vehicle. Alternatively, carsickness may occur when the vestibular system senses stillness but the eyes see motion.

In the early 20th century, Austro-Hungarian scientist Róbert Bárány observed the back-and-forth movement of the eyes of railroad passengers as they looked out the side windows at the scenery whipping by. He called this "railway nystagmus", also known as "optokinetic nystagmus". His findings were published in the journal Laeger, 83:1516, Nov.17, 1921.

==== Airsickness ====
Airsickness is essentially the same as carsickness, and is considered a normal response in healthy individuals. An airplane may bank and tilt sharply, and unless passengers are looking outside a window, they are likely to see only the stationary interior of the plane, especially during flights at night. Another factor is that while in flight, the view out of windows may be blocked by clouds, preventing passengers from seeing the moving ground or passing clouds.

==== Seasickness ====
Like airsickness, seasickness is essentially the same as carsickness, though the motion of a watercraft tends to be more regular. It is typically brought on by the rocking motion of the craft or movement while the craft is immersed in water. As with airsickness, it can be difficult to visually detect motion even if one looks outside the boat since water does not offer fixed points with which to visually judge motion. Poor visibility conditions, such as fog, may worsen seasickness. The greatest contributor to seasickness is the tendency for people affected by the rolling or surging motions of the craft to seek refuge below decks, where they are unable to relate themselves to the boat's surroundings and consequent motion. Some people with carsickness are resistant to seasickness and vice versa. Adjusting to the craft's motion at sea is called "gaining one's sea legs"; it can take a significant portion of the time spent at sea after disembarking to regain a sense of stability "post-sea legs".

==== Centrifuge motion sickness ====
Rotating devices such as centrifuges used in astronaut training and amusement park rides such as the Rotor, Mission: Space, and the Gravitron can cause motion sickness in many people. While the interior of the centrifuge does not appear to move, one will experience a sense of motion. In addition, centrifugal force can cause the vestibular system to give one the sense that downward is in the direction away from the center of the centrifuge rather than the true downward direction.

==== Dizziness due to spinning ====
When one spins and stops suddenly, fluid in the inner ear continues to rotate, causing a sense of continued spinning while one's visual system no longer detects motion.

==== Virtual reality ====
Usually, VR programs would detect the motion of the user's head and adjust the rotation of the vision to avoid dizziness. However, in some cases, such as system lagging or software crashing, this could cause lags in the screen updates. In such cases, even some small head motions could trigger motion sickness by the defense mechanism mentioned below: the inner ear transmits to the brain that it senses motion, but the eyes tell the brain that everything is still.

==== Virtual reality to reverse motion sickness ====
Recent research has shown that virtual reality can also be used therapeutically to reverse seasickness by reintroducing visual cues that align more closely with the body's sense of motion. One effective approach involves simulating a stable artificial horizon within the headset while simultaneously introducing low-amplitude visual motion that matches the real movement of the vessel, such as pitch, roll, and heave. By restoring coherence between visual and vestibular input, this method can help the brain reestablish sensory integration, thereby reducing or even eliminating symptoms of motion sickness within minutes. Systems that synchronize VR environments with vessel dynamics have demonstrated significant promise in field trials.

=== Motion seen but not felt ===
In these cases, motion is detected by the visual system and hence the motion is seen, but no motion or little motion is sensed by the vestibular system. Motion sickness arising from such situations has been referred to as "visually induced motion sickness" (VIMS).

==== Space motion sickness ====
Zero gravity interferes with the vestibular system's gravity-dependent operations, so that the two systems, vestibular and visual, no longer provide a unified and coherent sensory representation. This causes unpleasant disorientation sensations often quite distinct from terrestrial motion sickness, but with similar symptoms. The symptoms may be more intense because a condition caused by prolonged weightlessness is usually quite unfamiliar.

Space motion sickness was effectively unknown during the earliest spaceflights because the very cramped conditions of the spacecraft allowed for only minimal bodily motion, especially head motion. Space motion sickness seems to be aggravated by being able to freely move around, and so it is more common in larger spacecraft. Around 60% of Space Shuttle astronauts experienced it on their first flight; the first case of space motion sickness is now thought to be the Soviet cosmonaut Gherman Titov, in August 1961 onboard Vostok 2, who reported dizziness, nausea, and vomiting. The first severe cases were in early Apollo flights; Frank Borman on Apollo 8 and Rusty Schweickart on Apollo 9. Both experienced identifiable and quite unpleasant symptoms—in the latter case causing the mission plan to be modified.

==== Screen images ====
This type of terrestrial motion sickness is particularly prevalent when susceptible people are watching films presented on very large screens such as IMAX, but may also occur in regular format theaters or even when watching TV or playing games. For the sake of novelty, IMAX and other panoramic-type theaters often show dramatic motions such as flying over a landscape or riding a roller coaster.

In regular-format theaters, an example of a movie that caused motion sickness in many people is The Blair Witch Project. Theaters warned patrons of its possible nauseating effects, cautioning pregnant women in particular. Blair Witch was filmed with a handheld camcorder, which was subjected to considerably more motion than the average movie camera, and lacks the stabilization mechanisms of steadicams.

Home movies, often filmed with a cell phone camera, also tend to cause motion sickness in those who view them. The person holding the cell phone or other camera is usually unaware of this as the recording is being made, since the sense of motion seems to match the motion seen through the camera's viewfinder. Those who view the film afterward only see the movement, which may be considerable, without any sense of motion. Using the zoom function seems to contribute to motion sickness as well, since zooming is not a normal function of the eye. The use of a tripod or a camera or cell phone with image stabilization while filming can reduce this effect.

==== Virtual reality ====
Motion sickness due to virtual reality is very similar to simulation sickness and motion sickness due to films. In virtual reality, the effect is made more acute as all external reference points are blocked from vision, the simulated images are three-dimensional and in some cases stereo sound that may also give a sense of motion. The NADS-1, a simulator located at the National Advanced Driving Simulator, is capable of accurately stimulating the vestibular system with a 360-degree horizontal field of view and 13 degrees of freedom motion base. Studies have shown that exposure to rotational motions in a virtual environment can cause significant increases in nausea and other symptoms of motion sickness.

In a study conducted by the U.S. Army Research Institute for the Behavioral and Social Sciences in a report published May 1995 titled "Technical Report 1027 – Simulator Sickness in Virtual Environments", out of 742 pilot exposures from 11 military flight simulators, "approximately half of the pilots (334) reported post-effects of some kind: 250 (34%) reported that symptoms dissipated in less than one hour, 44 (6%) reported that symptoms lasted longer than four hours, and 28 (4%) reported that symptoms lasted longer than six hours. There were also four (1%) reported cases of spontaneously occurring flashbacks."

=== Motion that is seen and felt ===
When moving within a rotating reference frame, such as in a centrifuge or environment where gravity is simulated with centrifugal force, the Coriolis effect causes a sense of motion in the vestibular system that does not match the motion that is seen.

== Pathophysiology ==
Various hypotheses attempt to explain the cause of the condition.

=== Sensory conflict theory ===
Contemporary sensory conflict theory, referring to "a discontinuity between either visual, proprioceptive, and somatosensory input, or semicircular canal and otolith input", is probably the most thoroughly studied. According to this theory, when the brain presents the mind with two incongruous states of motion, the result is often nausea and other symptoms of disorientation known as motion sickness. Such conditions happen when the vestibular system and the visual system do not present a synchronized and unified representation of one's body and surroundings.

According to sensory conflict theory, the cause of terrestrial motion sickness is the opposite of the cause of space motion sickness. The former occurs when one perceives visually that one's surroundings are relatively immobile while the vestibular system reports that one's body is in motion relative to its surroundings. The latter can occur when the visual system perceives that one's surroundings are in motion while the vestibular system reports relative bodily immobility (as in zero gravity.)

=== Neural mismatch ===
A variation of the sensory conflict theory is known as neural mismatch, implying a mismatch occurring between ongoing sensory experience and long-term memory rather than between components of the vestibular and visual systems. This theory emphasizes "the limbic system in the integration of sensory information and long-term memory, in the expression of the symptoms of motion sickness, and the impact of anti-motion-sickness drugs and stress hormones on limbic system function. The limbic system may be the neural mismatch center of the brain."

=== Defense against poisoning ===
It has also been proposed that motion sickness could function as a defense mechanism against neurotoxins. The area postrema in the brain is responsible for inducing vomiting when poisons are detected, and for resolving conflicts between vision and balance. When feeling motion but not seeing it (for example, in the cabin of a ship with no portholes), the inner ear transmits to the brain that it senses motion, but the eyes tell the brain that everything is still. As a result of the incongruity, the brain concludes that the individual is hallucinating and further concludes that the hallucination is due to poison ingestion. The brain responds by inducing vomiting to clear the supposed toxin. Treisman's indirect argument has recently been questioned via an alternative direct evolutionary hypothesis, as well as modified and extended via a direct poison hypothesis. The direct evolutionary hypothesis essentially argues that there are plausible means by which ancient real or apparent motion could have contributed directly to the evolution of aversive reactions, without the need for the co-opting of a poison response as posited by Treisman. Nevertheless, the direct poison hypothesis argues that there still are plausible ways in which the body's poison response system may have played a role in shaping the evolution of some of the signature symptoms that characterize motion sickness.

=== Nystagmus hypothesis ===
Yet another theory, known as the nystagmus hypothesis, has been proposed based on stimulation of the vagus nerve resulting from the stretching or traction of extra-ocular muscles co-occurring with eye movements caused by vestibular stimulation. There are three critical aspects to the theory: first is the close linkage between activity in the vestibular system, i.e., semicircular canals and otolith organs, and a change in tonus among various of each eye's six extra-ocular muscles. Thus, except for voluntary eye movements, the vestibular and oculomotor systems are thoroughly linked. Second is the operation of Sherrington's Law describing reciprocal inhibition between agonist-antagonist muscle pairs, and by implication the stretching of extraocular muscle that must occur whenever Sherrington's Law is made to fail, thereby causing an unrelaxed (contracted) muscle to be stretched. Finally, there is the critical presence of afferent output to the Vagus nerves as a direct result of eye muscle stretch or traction. Thus, tenth nerve stimulation resulting from eye muscle stretch is proposed as the cause of motion sickness. The theory explains why labyrinthine-defective individuals are immune to motion sickness; why symptoms emerge when undergoing various body-head accelerations; why combinations of voluntary and reflexive eye movements may challenge the proper operation of Sherrington's Law, and why many drugs that suppress eye movements also serve to suppress motion sickness symptoms.

A recent theory argues that the main reason motion sickness occurs is due to an imbalance in vestibular outputs favoring the semicircular canals (nauseogenic) vs. otolith organs (anti-nauseogenic). This theory attempts to integrate previous theories of motion sickness. For example, there are many sensory conflicts that are associated with motion sickness and many that are not, but those in which canal stimulation occurs in the absence of normal otolith function (e.g., in free fall) are the most provocative. The vestibular imbalance theory is also tied to the different roles of the otoliths and canals in autonomic arousal (otolith output is more sympathetic).

=== Exhausted Brain Theory ===
The Exhausted Brain Theory (EBT) proposes that motion sickness and cybersickness originate from the metabolic cost of neural adaptation when the brain is forced to reconcile conflicting or unfamiliar sensory inputs. Instead of describing sickness purely as a sensory mismatch, EBT interprets it as a state of neural energy exhaustion in multisensory cortical networks responsible for perceptual coherence.

According to the theory, continuous re-adaptation to inconsistent sensory information—such as visual–vestibular discordance in virtual or real motion—requires substantial metabolic energy to update predictive internal models. When the energetic demand of this process exceeds available resources, functional fatigue develops, leading to nausea, dizziness, and other sickness symptoms.

EBT builds on predictive-coding and information-theoretic perspectives, viewing the brain as an energy-limited inference system. Under strong sensory conflicts, prediction-error minimization becomes metabolically unsustainable, resulting in temporary neural exhaustion. Physiological studies of cybersickness show changes consistent with this framework, including altered cerebral oxygenation, pupil dilation, and autonomic regulation during symptom onset.

EBT complements earlier frameworks such as the sensory-conflict and postural-instability theories, framing them as behavioral outcomes of an underlying energetic limitation in the brain's adaptive processes.

== Diagnosis ==
The diagnosis is based on symptoms. Other conditions that may present similarly include vestibular disorders such as benign paroxysmal positional vertigo and vestibular migraine and stroke.

Motion sickness susceptibility is usually at its highest between ages 7 and 12, while children under 2 years old do not experience it. Studies show that women are more susceptible than men due to hormonal factors, but anyone with a history of migraines, vertigo, or any vestibular disorders is among the most sensitive to the effects of motion sickness.

== Treatment ==
Treatment may include behavioral measures or medications.

=== Behavioral measures ===
Behavioral measures to decrease motion sickness include holding the head still and lying on one's back. Focusing on the horizon may also be useful. Listening to music, mindful breathing, being the driver, and not reading while moving are other techniques.

Some measures that can worsen the effects of motion sickness are: use of nicotine (smoking and alcohol consumption), and being sleep-deprived. Distractions can be helpful, for example: listening to music, getting fresh air on the face, smelling pleasant scents, and, by far the most effective, controlled breathing, which stimulates the inhibitory defense reflex between respiration and vomiting. Other non-pharmacological measures, like using bands or ginger, may be nothing more than a placebo; however, a strong placebo effect can prove to be more helpful at relieving the symptoms.

Habituation is the most effective technique, but requires significant time. It is often used by the military for pilots. These techniques must be carried out at least every week to retain effectiveness.

A head-worn, computer device with a transparent display can be used to mitigate the effects of motion sickness (and spatial disorientation) if visual indicators of the wearer's head position are shown. Such a device functions by providing the wearer with digital reference lines in their field of vision that indicate the horizon's position relative to the user's head. This is accomplished by combining readings from accelerometers and gyroscopes mounted in the device. This technology has been implemented in both standalone devices and Google Glass. One promising looking treatment is to wear LCD shutter glasses that create a stroboscopic vision of 4 Hz with a dwell of 10 milliseconds.

=== Medication ===
Three types of medications are sometimes prescribed to improve symptoms of motion sickness: antimuscarinics such as scopolamine, H_{1} antihistamines such as dimenhydrinate, and amphetamines such as dexamphetamine. Benefits are greater if used before the onset of symptoms or shortly after symptoms begin. Side effects, however, may limit the use of medications. A number of medications used for nausea such as ondansetron and metoclopramide are not effective in motion sickness.

Tradipitant (Nereus) was approved for medical use in the United States in December 2025.

==== Scopolamine (antimuscarinic) ====
Scopolamine is the most effective medication. Evidence is best for when it is used preventatively. It is available as a skin patch. Side effects may include blurry vision.

==== Antihistamines ====
First-generation H1 antihistamine medications are sometimes given to prevent or treat motion sickness. This class of medication is often effective at reducing the risk of getting motion sickness while in motion; however, the effectiveness of antihistamines at treating or stopping motion sickness once a person is already experiencing it has not been well studied. Effective first generation antihistamines include doxylamine, diphenhydramine, promethazine, meclizine, cyclizine, and cinnarizine. In pregnancy meclizine, dimenhydrinate and doxylamine are generally felt to be safe. Side effects include sleepiness. Second generation antihistamines have not been found to be useful.

Some, but not all, antihistamines used for motion sickness are also antimuscarinics.

==== Amphetamines ====
Dextroamphetamine may be used together with an antihistamine or an antimuscarinic with synergistic effects. Concerns include their addictive potential.

Those involved in high-risk activities, such as SCUBA diving, should evaluate the risks versus the benefits of medications. Promethazine combined with ephedrine to counteract the sedation is known as "the Coast Guard cocktail".

=== Alternative medicine ===
Alternative treatments include acupuncture and ginger, although their effectiveness against motion sickness is variable. Providing smells does not appear to have a significant effect on the rate of motion sickness.

==== Wristbands ====
To dampen the nausea signals to the brain, you can stimulate the median nerve in the inner wrist by wearing acupressure bands. They are made out of stretchy fabric with a small plastic button that presses a spot on the wrist. Electrical bands are also available, which send low-level electrical pulses to the inner wrist.

==== Motion Sickness Glasses ====
These glasses have circular frames with either clear or no lenses, and one additional frame on each side of the head. The frames are partially filled with a blue fluid, which moves around with the person’s movement. The theory is that these glasses help the eyes build an artificial horizon, providing a better sense of orientation in gravity, which gives the brain information to minimize motion sickness.

== Epidemiology ==
Roughly one-third of people are highly susceptible to motion sickness, and most of the rest get motion sick under extreme conditions. Around 80% of the general population is susceptible to cases of moderate-to-severe motion sickness. The rates of space motion sickness have been estimated at between forty and eighty percent of those who enter weightless orbit. Several factors influence susceptibility to motion sickness, including sleep deprivation and the cubic footage allocated to each space traveler. Studies indicate that women are more likely to be affected than men, and that the risk decreases with advancing age. There is some evidence that people with Asian ancestry may develop motion sickness more frequently than people of European ancestry, and there are situational and behavioral factors, such as whether a passenger has a view of the road ahead, diet, and eating behaviors.

== See also ==
- Mal de debarquement - disembarkment syndrome, usually follows a cruise or other motion experience
