= Endolymphatic hydrops =

Disorder of the inner ear

Endolymphatic hydrops is a disorder of the inner ear. It consists of an excessive build-up of the endolymph fluid, which fills the hearing and balance structures of the inner ear. Endolymph fluid, which is partly regulated by the endolymph sac, flows through the inner ear and is critical to the function of all sensory cells in the inner ear. In addition to water, endolymph fluid contains salts such as sodium, potassium, chloride and other electrolytes. If the inner ear is damaged by disease or injury, the volume and composition of the endolymph fluid can change, causing the symptoms of endolymphatic hydrops.

== Symptoms ==
The symptoms of endolymphatic hydrops include the feeling of pressure or fullness in the ears, hearing loss, tinnitus (ringing in the ears) and balance problems. Individuals who have Ménière's disease have a degree of endolymphatic hydrops that is strong enough to trigger the symptoms of this disease, but individuals with endolymphatic hydrops do not always progress to Ménière’s disease.

== Causes ==
Endolymphatic hydrops may occur as a result of trauma such as a blow to the head, infection, degeneration of the inner ear, allergies, dehydration and loss of electrolytes or in extremely rare circumstances a benign tumor such as an endolymphatic sac tumor. In many cases, it is not clear what causes the disorder. Ménière’s attacks occur when there is an increase in endolymphatic volume in the inner ear, causing a temporary leak in the membrane separating the perilymph (potassium poor fluid) and the endolymph (potassium rich fluid). The mix of these two fluids surrounding the vestibular sensory cells can lead to a temporary electrical blockade and loss of sensory function. The sudden change in the rate of the vestibular nerve firing results in a disturbance of signal processing in the corresponding brain regions, and thus to acute sensations of imbalance, otherwise known as vertigo.

== Diagnosis ==
Posthumous diagnosis can be done using petrous bone autopsy, although fixation artifacts during tissue preparation might artificially skew hydrops diagnosis rates. In-vivo hydrops analysis can be performed using time delayed inner ear MRI with contrast agent.

== Treatment ==
Low salt, low sugar diet and keeping hydrated. Medications may include corticosteroids and/or diuretics.

Caffeine should be avoided.
