= Prosper Menière =

French doctor (1799–1862)

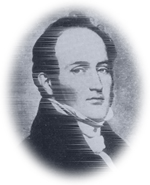
- Born: 18 June 1799; Angers, France
- Died: 7 February 1862 (aged 62); Paris, France
- Known for: Ménière's disease
- Scientific career
- Fields: Medicine

Prosper Menière (18 June 1799 – 7 February 1862) was a French medical doctor who first identified that the inner ear could be the source of a condition combining vertigo, hearing loss and tinnitus, which is now known as Ménière's disease.

== Biography ==
Menière was born in Angers, France. During his education he excelled at humanities and classics. He completed his medical studies at Hôtel-Dieu de Paris in 1826, and earned his M.D. in 1828. He then assisted Guillaume Dupuytren.

Menière was originally set to be an assistant professor in faculty, but political tensions disturbed his professorship and he was sent to control the spread of cholera. He received a legion of honor for his work, but never gained professorship. After securing the position of physician-in-chief at the Institute for deaf-mutes, he focused on the diseases of the ear.

Menière's studies at the deaf-mute institute helped formulate his paper, "On a particular kind of hearing loss resulting from lesions of the inner ear", which ultimately led to the recognition of Ménière's disease.

There is debate as to how Menière's name is spelled. Prosper himself was known to write his name as "Menière" while his son used the spelling "Ménière". Many people omit the accent marks.
