= Vestibular paroxysmia =

Rare vertigo syndrome

- Specialty: Otorhinolaryngology
- Symptoms: Short attacks of vertigo, tinnitus
- Causes: Compression of the vestibulocochlear nerve
- Risk factors: Male sex, age 40-70
- Treatment: Medication, microvascular decompression
- Medication: Oxcarbazepine, carbamazepine, lacosamide
- Prognosis: Most patients are symptom-free after 5 years

Vestibular paroxysmia (VP) is a rare vertigo syndrome, which is defined by recurring, short-lasting vertigo attacks. A neurovascular cross-compression is commonly assumed to cause these attacks.

== Signs and symptoms ==
The main symptoms of VP are short attacks lasting seconds to a few minutes with spinning or swaying vertigo, which typically occur dozens of times a day. This may be accompanied by rhythmic tinnitus. In some patients, the attacks can be triggered by certain head positions or by hyperventilation.

== Cause ==
The vertigo attacks are caused by pulsatile compression of the vestibulocochlear nerve by blood vessels (in 70% of cases the anterior inferior cerebellar artery (AICA)) in the cerebellopontine angle, which can cause demyelinsation of the nerve. The nerve is particularly susceptible in the area of the nerve entry zone into the brain stem, as the structure of the myelin sheath changes here (from oligodendrocytes to Schwann cells).

== Diagnosis ==
In terms of the diagnostic criteria we find that the following must be met:

1. At least ten attacks of spontaneous spinning or non-spinning vertigo
2. Duration less than 1 minute
3. Stereotyped phenomenology in a particular patient
4. Response to a treatment with carbamazepine/oxcarbazepine
5. Not better accounted for by another diagnosis.

A definitive diagnosis can usually only be made after a successful attempt at pharmacotherapy. Vascular-nerve contact demonstrated by magnetic resonance imaging is not part of the diagnostic criteria. Appropriate imaging should be performed to rule out other structural changes in the cerebellopontine angle.

== Treatment ==
Pharmacotherapy often involves oxcarbazepine, carbamazepine or lacosamide. In very rare cases, surgery in the form of microvascular decompression may also be indicated.

== Prognosis ==
In a long-term study (mean follow-up time 4.8 years), around 75% of patients remained without vertigo attacks, and in more than half of them no drug therapy was necessary.

== Epidemiology ==
Depending on the origin, there are two peaks in frequency: in the case of causative vascular malformations, those affected become symptomatic at a young age, while age-associated vascular changes usually cause symptoms for the first time between the ages of 40 and 70. Men are affected twice as often as women. Vestibular paroxysmia accounts for around 3% of diagnoses in specialized vertigo outpatient clinics.
