= Labyrinthitis =

Inflammation of the labyrinth (inner ear)

Labyrinthitis and vestibular neuritis
- Other names: Otitis interna, vestibular neuronitis, vestibular neuritis
- Diagram of the inner ear
- Specialty: Otorhinolaryngology
- Frequency: 3.5 cases per 100,000

Labyrinthitis is inflammation of the labyrinth, a maze of fluid-filled channels in the inner ear. Vestibular neuritis is inflammation of the vestibular nerve (the nerve in the ear that sends messages related to motion and position to the brain). Both conditions involve inflammation of the inner ear. Labyrinths that house the vestibular system sense changes in the head's position or the head's motion. Inflammation of these inner ear parts results in a vertigo (sensation of the world spinning) and also possible hearing loss or tinnitus (ringing in the ears). It can occur as a single attack, a series of attacks, or a persistent condition that diminishes over three to six weeks. It may be associated with nausea, vomiting, and eye nystagmus.

The cause is often not clear. It may be due to a virus, but it can also arise from bacterial infection, head injury, extreme stress, an allergy, or as a reaction to medication. 30% of affected people had a common cold before developing the disease. Either bacterial or viral labyrinthitis can cause a permanent hearing loss in rare cases. This appears to result from an imbalance of neuronal input between the left and right inner ears.

== Signs and symptoms ==
The main symptoms are severe vertigo and nystagmus. The most common symptom of vestibular neuritis is the onset of vertigo due to an ongoing infection or trauma. The dizziness sensation that is associated with vertigo is thought to be from the inner ear labyrinth. Rapid and undesired eye motion (nystagmus) often results from the improper indication of rotational motion. Nausea, anxiety, and a general ill feeling are common due to the distorted balance signals that the brain receives from the inner ear system. Other common symptoms include tinnitus, ear ache, and a feeling of fullness in the ear.

== Causes ==
Some cases of vestibular neuritis are thought to be caused by an infection of the vestibular ganglion by the herpes simplex type 1 virus. However, the cause of this condition is not fully understood, and in fact, many different viruses may be capable of infecting the vestibular nerve.

Acute localized ischemia of these structures also may be an important cause. Especially in children, vestibular neuritis may be preceded by symptoms of a common cold. However, the causative mechanism remains uncertain.

This can also be brought on by pressure changes such as those experienced while flying or scuba diving.

== Mechanism ==
In the vestibular system, there are three canals that are semicircular in shape and input sensory clues. These canals allow the brain to sense rotational motion and linear motion changes. The brain then uses the sensory input clues and the visual input clues from the vestibular system to retain balance. The vestibulo-ocular reflex retains continuous visual focus during motion, which is also the vestibular system's purpose during activity.

== Treatment ==
The treatment for vestibular neuritis depends on the cause. However, symptoms of vertigo can be treated in the same way as other vestibular dysfunctions with vestibular rehabilitation.

=== Physical therapy ===
Typical treatments include combinations of head and eye movements, postural changes, and walking exercises. Specifically, exercises that may be prescribed include keeping eyes fixated on a specific target while moving the head, moving the head right to left at two targets at a significant distance apart, walking while keeping eyes fixated on a specific target, and walking while keeping eyes fixated on a specific target while also turning the head in different directions. The main function behind repeating a combination of head and eye movements, postural changes, and walking is that through this repetition, compensatory changes for the dysfunctions arising from peripheral vestibular structures may be promoted in the central vestibular system (brainstem and cerebellum).

Vestibular rehabilitation therapy is a highly effective way to reduce or eliminate residual dizziness from labyrinthitis substantially. VRT works by causing the brain to use already existing neural mechanisms for adaptation, neuroplasticity, and compensation. Vestibular neuritis rehabilitation is an effective and safe management to improve symptoms. The vestibular neuritis rehabilitation can improve symptoms or resolve the symptoms which is dependent on each individual.

Rehabilitation strategies most commonly used are:

- Gaze stability exercises – moving the head from side to side while fixated on a stationary object (aimed at assisting the eye to fixate during head rotation without the input from the lost canal vestibulo-ocular reflex). An advanced progression of this exercise would be walking in a straight line while looking side to side by turning the head.
- Habituation exercises – movements designed to provoke symptoms and subsequently reduce the negative vestibular response upon repetition. Examples of these include Brandt–Daroff exercises.
- Functional retraining – including postural control, relaxation, and balance training.

These exercises function by challenging the vestibular system. Progression occurs by increasing the amplitude of the head or focal point movements, increasing the speed of movement, and combining movements such as walking and head turning.

One study found that patients who believed their illness was out of their control showed the slowest progression to full recovery, long after the initial vestibular injury had healed. The study revealed that the patient who compensated well was one who, at the psychological level, was not afraid of the symptoms and had some positive control over them. Notably, a reduction in negative beliefs over time was greater in those patients treated with rehabilitation than in those untreated. "Of utmost importance, baseline beliefs were the only significant predictor of change in a handicap at 6 months follow-up."

=== Medication ===
Vestibular neuritis is generally self-limiting. Treatment with drugs is neither effective nor necessary. The effect of glucocorticoids has been studied; they have not been found to affect the long-term outcome significantly .

Symptomatic treatment with antihistaminics such as cinnarizine, however, can be used to suppress the symptoms of vestibular neuritis as it spontaneously regresses. Prochlorperazine is another commonly prescribed medication to help alleviate the symptoms of vertigo and nausea.

=== Mental disorders ===
Because mood disorders can hamper recovery from labyrinthitis, treatment may also include any co-occurring anxiety disorder or depression. Severe anxiety episodes are usually addressed by short-term benzodiazepine therapy.

== Prognosis ==
Recovery from acute labyrinthine inflammation generally takes from one to six weeks. It is not uncommon for residual symptoms such as dysequilibrium and dizziness to last for a couple of months.

Recovery from a temporarily damaged inner ear typically follows two phases:

1. An acute period, which may include severe vertigo and vomiting
2. approximately two weeks of sub-acute symptoms and rapid recovery

== Epidemiology ==
The prevalence of vestibular neuritis is approximately 3.5 cases per 100,000 people. It typically occurs in those aged 30 to 60 years, and there are no significant differences between male and female incidence rates. In 95% of cases, sufferers experience a single attack and fully recover. Vestibular rehabilitation showed a statistically significant increase in controlling symptoms over no intervention in people who have vestibular neuritis.
