= Positional alcohol nystagmus =

Eye condition induced by alcohol

Positional alcohol nystagmus (PAN) is nystagmus (visible jerkiness in eye movement) produced when the head is placed in a sideways position. PAN occurs when the specific gravity of the perilymph filled membrane space (bony labyrinth) of the semicircular canals in the ear differs from the specific gravity of the endolymph fluid in the canals (membranous labyrinth) because of the presence of alcohol. Heavy water ingestion has the opposite effect.

== PAN I ==
When a person consumes alcohol, the alcohol is carried by the bloodstream and diffused into the water compartments of the body. Normally, the specific gravity of a canal membrane is the same as the specific gravity of the surrounding fluid. Because of this, even though the Earth's gravity is a constant force of acceleration, the semicircular canals do not respond to it. Alcohol has a lighter specific gravity than water. When alcohol enters the canal membrane via capillaries, the specific gravity inside the canal membrane is lower than that of the surrounding fluid. The alcohol does diffuse from the membrane to the surrounding fluid also, but it does so very slowly. While the specific gravity inside the canal membrane is lower than the specific gravity of the extracellular fluid, the hair cells on the membrane become responsive to the Earth's gravity. This is the condition of PAN I.

PAN I is characterized by a nystagmus to the left when the left side of the head is down or right side when the right side of the head is down. It is typically present during a rising and peak blood alcohol concentration (BAC).

== PAN II ==
As soon as a person starts drinking, the body begins to process and eliminate the alcohol. The rate of elimination is fairly constant. Initially, the rate of absorption exceeds the rate of elimination, which results in a rising BAC. Sometime after a person stops drinking, the rate of absorption drops below the rate of elimination, and the BAC begins falling. As alcohol is eliminated from the body, it is removed from the membrane of the semicircular canal faster than from the surrounding fluid. This creates the reverse situation of PAN I, as the specific gravity of the surrounding fluid is now lower than that inside the canal membrane. This results in PAN II.

PAN II is characterized by a nystagmus to the right when the left side of the head is down (or to left when the right side of the head is down).

== Relationship between PAN and the effects of intoxication ==
The overstimulation of the semicircular canals during PAN I and PAN II is associated with the unsteadiness, nausea, and vertigo felt by intoxicated people. PAN I is more associated with postural problems (e.g. standing and walking) while PAN II has been more associated with the feelings of a hangover.

There is a brief period between PAN I and PAN II when the alcohol concentrations in the canal membrane and extracellular fluid are in equilibrium. During this time, neither PAN I nor PAN II is present.

== PAN versus testing for HGN in intoxicated individuals ==
Horizontal gaze nystagmus (HGN) testing is a common practice used by law enforcement in the United States in the identification of persons who are intoxicated or under the influence of a controlled substance. The key difference between recognizing PAN and horizontal gaze nystagmus is the position of the subject's head in relation to the body. PAN is identified when the head is tilted to one side or the other. In order for HGN to be properly identified, the head must be positioned in line with the spine. Because of this, if the head is tilted towards the side when an evaluation for HGN is given, PAN may be induced and give a "false positive" for HGN. Some defendants may claim or argue that the nystagmus observed by an officer was positional and not horizontal gaze.

== See also ==
- Optokinetic reflex
- Nystagmus
