= Labyrinthectomy =

- Specialty: Otolaryngologists

A labyrinthectomy is a procedure used to decrease the function of the labyrinth of the inner ear. This can be done surgically or chemically. It may be done to treat Ménière's disease.
