= Ménière's disease =

Disorder of the inner ear

- Other names: Ménière's syndrome, idiopathic endolymphatic hydrops
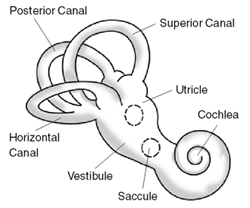
- Diagram of the inner ear
- Pronunciation: /meɪnˈjɛərz/
- Specialty: Otolaryngology, Neurology
- Symptoms: Vertigo, tinnitus, hearing loss, fullness in the ear
- Usual onset: 40s–60s
- Duration: 20 minutes to few hours per episode
- Causes: Unknown
- Risk factors: Family history
- Diagnostic method: Based on symptoms, hearing test
- Differential diagnosis: Vestibular migraine, transient ischemic attack
- Treatment: Low-salt diet, diuretics, corticosteroids, counselling
- Prognosis: After ~10 years hearing loss and chronic ringing
- Frequency: 0.3–1.9 per 1,000

Ménière's disease (MD) is a disease of the inner ear characterized by potentially severe and incapacitating episodes of vertigo, tinnitus, hearing loss, and a feeling of fullness in the ear. Typically, only one ear is affected initially, but over time, both ears may become involved. Episodes generally last from 20 minutes to a few hours, with varying time between episodes. The hearing loss and ringing in the ears can become constant over time. Ménière's disease was identified in the mid-1800s by Prosper Menière.

The cause of Ménière's disease is unclear, but likely involves both genetic and environmental factors. Several theories exist for why it occurs, including constrictions in blood vessels, viral infections, and autoimmune reactions. About 10% of cases run in families. Symptoms are believed to occur as the result of increased fluid buildup in the labyrinth of the inner ear. Diagnosis is based on the symptoms and a hearing test. Other conditions that may produce similar symptoms include vestibular migraine and transient ischemic attack.

No cure is known. Attacks are often treated with medications to help with the nausea and anxiety. Measures to prevent attacks are overall poorly supported by the evidence. A low-salt diet, diuretics, and corticosteroids may be tried. Physical therapy may help with balance and counselling may help with anxiety. Injections into the ear or surgery may also be tried if other measures are not effective, but are associated with risks. The use of tympanostomy tubes (ventilation tubes) to improve vertigo and hearing in people with Ménière's disease is not supported by definitive evidence.

The disease affects between 0.3 and 1.9 per 1,000 people. The onset of Ménière's disease is usually around 40 to 60 years old. Females are more commonly affected than males. After 5–15 years of symptoms, episodes that include dizziness or a sensation of spinning sometimes stop, and the person is left with loss of balance, poor hearing in the affected ear, and ringing or other sounds in the affected ear or ears.

== Signs and symptoms ==
Ménière's is characterized by recurrent episodes of vertigo, fluctuating hearing loss, and tinnitus; episodes may be preceded by a headache and a feeling of fullness in the ears. People may also experience additional symptoms related to irregular reactions of the autonomic nervous system. These symptoms are not symptoms of Ménière's disease per se, but rather are side effects resulting from failure of the organ of hearing and balance, and include nausea, vomiting, and sweating, which are typically symptoms of vertigo, and not of Ménière's. This includes a sensation of being pushed sharply to the floor from behind. Sudden falls without loss of consciousness (drop attacks) may be experienced by some people.

== Causes ==
The cause of Ménière's disease is unclear, but it likely involves both genetic and environmental factors. Several theories exist, including constrictions in blood vessels, viral infections, and autoimmune reactions.

== Mechanism ==
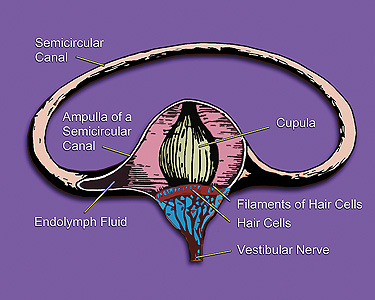
Inner ear

The initial triggers of Ménière's disease are not fully understood, with a variety of potential inflammatory causes that lead to endolymphatic hydrops (EH), a distension of the endolymphatic spaces in the inner ear. Endolymphatic hydrops is strongly associated with developing Ménière's disease, but not everyone with EH develops Ménière's disease: "The relationship between endolymphatic hydrops and Meniere's disease is not a simple, ideal correlation." Notably, mild EH can also occur in vestibular migraine, which is an important differential diagnosis for Ménière's disease.

Additionally, in fully developed Ménière's disease, the balance system (vestibular system) and the hearing system (cochlea) of the inner ear are affected, but some cases occur where EH affects only one of the two systems enough to cause symptoms. The corresponding subtypes of the disease are called vestibular Ménière's disease, showing symptoms of vertigo, and cochlear Ménière's disease, showing symptoms of hearing loss and tinnitus.

The mechanism of Ménière's disease is not fully explained by EH, but fully developed EH may mechanically and chemically interfere with the sensory cells for balance and hearing, which can lead to temporary dysfunction and even to death of the sensory cells, which in turn can cause the typical symptoms of MD – vertigo, hearing loss, and tinnitus.

An estimated 30% of people with Ménière's disease have Eustachian tube dysfunction.

== Diagnosis ==
Audiograms illustrating normal hearing (left) and unilateral low-pitch hearing loss associated with Ménière's disease (right)

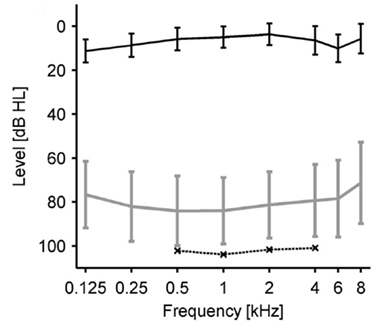
Loudness discomfort levels (LDLs) – data of people with hyperacusis without hearing loss. Upper line: average hearing thresholds. Lower long line: LDLs of this group. Lower short line: LDLs of a reference group with normal hearing.

The diagnostic criteria as of 2015 define definite MD and probable MD as:

Definite

1. Two or more spontaneous episodes of vertigo, each lasting 20 minutes to 12 hours
2. Audiometrically documented low- to medium-frequency sensorineural hearing loss in the affected ear on at least one occasion before, during, or after one of the episodes of vertigo
3. Fluctuating aural symptoms (hearing, tinnitus, or fullness) in the affected ear
4. Not better accounted for by another vestibular diagnosis

Probable

1. Two or more episodes of vertigo or dizziness, each lasting 20 minutes to 24 hours
2. Fluctuating aural symptoms (hearing, tinnitus, or fullness) in the reported ear
3. Not better accounted for by another vestibular diagnosis

A common and important symptom of MD is hypersensitivity to sounds. This hypersensitivity is easily diagnosed by measuring the loudness discomfort levels (LDLs).

Symptoms of MD overlap with migraine-associated vertigo (MAV) in many ways, but when hearing loss develops in MAV, it is usually in both ears, and this is rare in MD, and hearing loss generally does not progress in MAV as it does in MD.

People who have had a transient ischemic attack (TIA) or stroke can present with symptoms similar to MD, and in people at risk, magnetic resonance imaging should be conducted to exclude TIA or stroke.

Other vestibular conditions that should be excluded include vestibular paroxysmia, recurrent unilateral vestibulopathy, vestibular schwannoma, or a tumor of the endolymphatic sac.

== Management ==
No cure for Ménière's disease is known, but medications, diet, physical therapy, counseling, and some surgical approaches can be used to manage the vertigo. Currently there are no interventions that preserve hearing but, quality of life can be improved with hearing aids or cochlear implant. More than 85% of patients with Ménière's disease get better from changes in lifestyle, medical treatment, or minimally invasive surgical procedures. Those procedures include intratympanic (into the cavity behind the eardrum, known as the tympanic cavity) steroid therapy, intratympanic gentamicin therapy or endolymphatic sac surgery.

=== Medications ===
During MD episodes, medications to reduce nausea are used, as are drugs to reduce anxiety caused by vertigo. For longer-term treatment to stop progression, the evidence base is weak for all treatments. Although a causal relation between allergy and Ménière's disease is uncertain, medication to control allergies may be helpful. To assist with vertigo and balance problems, glycopyrrolate is a useful vestibular suppressant in patients with Ménière's disease.

Diuretics, such as the thiazide-like diuretic chlortalidone, are widely used to manage MD on the theory that it reduces fluid buildup (pressure) in the ear. Based on evidence from multiple but small clinical trials, diuretics appear to be useful for reducing the frequency of episodes of dizziness but do not seem to prevent hearing loss.

Carbonic anhydrase inhibitors like acetazolamide have been used to treat MD with a decrease in vertigo attacks in over 70% of patients in a smaller 2024 study. However, patients need to be monitored carefully for side effects such as hypokalemia and numbness in the hands and feet.

In cases where hearing loss and continuing severe episodes of vertigo occur, a chemical labyrinthectomy, in which a medication such as gentamicin is injected into the middle ear and kills parts of the vestibular apparatus, may be prescribed. This treatment has the risk of worsening hearing loss.

=== Diet ===
People with MD are often advised to reduce their sodium intake. Reducing salt intake, however, has not been well studied. Based on the assumption that MD is similar in nature to a migraine, some advise eliminating migraine triggers such as caffeine, but the evidence for this is weak. There is no high-quality evidence that changing diet by restricting salt, caffeine, or alcohol improves symptoms.

=== Physical therapy ===
While the use of physical therapy early after the onset of MD is probably not useful due to the fluctuating disease course, physical therapy to help retrain the balance system appears to be useful to reduce both subjective and objective deficits in balance over the longer term.

=== Counseling ===
The psychological distress caused by the vertigo and hearing loss may worsen the condition in some people. Counseling may be useful to manage the distress, as may education and relaxation techniques.

=== Surgery ===
If symptoms do not improve with less invasive approaches, and for cases where the condition is uncontrolled or persistent and affecting both ears, surgery may be considered.

==== Endolymphatic sac surgery ====
Surgery to decompress the endolymphatic sac is sometimes suggested. Three methods of surgical endolymphatic sac decompression are sometimes suggested – simple decompression, insertion of a shunt, or removal of the sac. There is some very weak evidence that all three methods may be useful for reducing dizziness, but that the level of evidence supporting these surgical procedures is low, with further higher quality investigations being suggested. There is a risk in these types of surgical procedures that the shunts used in these surgeries are at risk of becoming displaced or misplaced. For those with severe cases who are eligible for endolymphatic sac decompression, a 2014 systematic review reported that in at least 75% of people, EL sac decompression was effective at controlling vertigo in the short term (>1 year of follow-up) and long term (>24 months).

==== Ventilation tubes ====
Medical studies do not strongly support surgical implantation of eustachian tubes (ventilation tubes). There is some tentative evidence of benefit from tympanostomy tubes for improving the unsteadiness associated with the disease, but conclusions about how effective this surgery is and the potential for side effects and harms are not clear.

==== Other surgical interventions ====
Destructive surgeries such as vestibular nerve labyrinthectomy are irreversible and involve removing the entire functionality of most, if not all, of the affected ear; as of 2013, almost no evidence existed with which to judge whether these surgeries are effective. The inner ear itself can be surgically removed via labyrinthectomy, although hearing is always completely lost in the affected ear with this operation. The surgeon can also cut the nerve to the balance portion of the inner ear in a vestibular neurectomy. The hearing is often mostly preserved; however, the surgery involves cutting open into the lining of the brain, and a hospital stay of a few days for monitoring is required.

=== Poorly supported ===
- As of 2014, betahistine is often used as it is inexpensive and safe; but evidence does not justify its use in Ménière's disease. However, recent pharmacokinetic experiments have shown that combination therapy with Monoamine oxidase inhibitors can drastically increase the bioavailability of betahistine in humans, and improve cochlear blood flow in guinea pigs.
- Transtympanic micropressure pulses were investigated in two systematic reviews. Neither found evidence to justify this technique.
- Intratympanic steroids were investigated in three systematic reviews. The data were found to be insufficient to decide if this therapy has positive effects.
- Evidence does not support the use of alternative medicine such as acupuncture or herbal supplements.

== Prognosis ==
Ménière's disease usually starts confined to one ear; only 11% of patients are affected in both ears when they first present for evaluation. Patients who begin with unilateral Ménière's have a 13% chance of progressing to bilateral presentation, with a mean time to conversion of 8.2 years. People may start with only one symptom, but in Ménière's disease, all three appear with time. Hearing loss usually fluctuates in the beginning stages and becomes more permanent in later stages. Ménière's disease has a course of 5–15 years, and people generally end up with mild disequilibrium, tinnitus, and moderate hearing loss in one ear. As of 2020, there has been no recent breakthrough in the pathogenesis research of Ménière's disease.

== Epidemiology ==
From 3 to 11% of diagnosed dizziness in neuro-otological clinics is due to Ménière's disease. The annual incidence rate is estimated to be about 15 cases per 100,000 people and the prevalence rate is about 218 per 100,000, and around 15% of people with Ménière's disease are older than 65. In around 9% of cases, a relative also had Ménière's disease, indicating a genetic predisposition in some cases.

The odds of Ménière's disease are greater for people of white ethnicity, with severe obesity, and women. Several conditions are often comorbid with Ménière's disease, including arthritis, psoriasis, gastroesophageal reflux disease, irritable bowel syndrome, and migraine.

== History ==
The condition is named after the French physician Prosper Menière, who in an 1861 article described the main symptoms and was the first to suggest a single disorder for all of the symptoms, in the combined organ of balance and hearing in the inner ear.

The American Academy of Otolaryngology – Head and Neck Surgery Committee on Hearing and Equilibrium set criteria for diagnosing MD, as well as defining two subcategories – cochlear (without vertigo) and vestibular (without deafness).

In 1972, the academy defined criteria for diagnosing MD as:

1. Fluctuating, progressive, sensorineural deafness
2. Episodic, characteristic, definitive spells of vertigo lasting 20 minutes to 24 hours with no unconsciousness, vestibular nystagmus always present.
3. Tinnitus (ringing in the ears, from mild to severe) is often accompanied by ear pain and a feeling of fullness in the affected ear; usually, the tinnitus is more severe before a spell of vertigo and lessens after the vertigo attack.
4. Attacks are characterized by periods of remission and exacerbation.

In 1985, this list changed to alter wording, such as changing "deafness" to "hearing loss associated with tinnitus, characteristically of low frequencies", and requiring more than one attack of vertigo to diagnose. Finally, in 1995, the list was again altered to allow for degrees of the disease:

1. Certain – Definite disease with histopathological confirmation
2. Definite – Requires two or more definitive episodes of vertigo with hearing loss plus tinnitus and/or aural fullness
3. Probable – Only one definitive episode of vertigo, and the other symptoms and signs
4. Possible – Definitive vertigo with no associated hearing loss

In 2015, the International Classification for Vestibular Disorders Committee of the Barany Society published consensus diagnostic criteria in collaboration with the American Academy of Otolaryngology–Head and Neck Surgery, the European Academy of Otology and Neurootology, the Japan Society for Equilibrium Research, and the Korean Balance Society.
