= Margaret Dix =

British neuro-otologist

Margaret Ruth Dix (1902 – 9 December 1991) was a British neuro-otologist. With Charles Skinner Hallpike, she published important research on vertigo and described the Dix–Hallpike test.

== Biography ==
Dix was born in 1902 and attended Sherborne School for Girls. She studied medicine at the Royal Free Hospital School of Medicine, earning her MBBS in 1937. She then began training as a surgeon, but in 1940 she was injured in an air-raid during the Blitz that left her with a facial disfigurement and pieces of glass in her eyes, forcing her to give up her surgical career.

Dix joined the National Hospital for Neurology and Neurosurgery as a Medical Research Council researcher in 1945, studying deafness in ex-servicemen. She was hired by Charles Skinner Hallpike, who encouraged her to pursue a career in neuro-otology, the study of the inner ear. Dix and Hallpike published a landmark series in 1952 in the Proceedings of the Royal Society of Medicine and the Annals of Otology, Rhinology, and Laryngology; it described the main causes of vertigo and how to differentiate between them. They also described the eponymous Dix–Hallpike test, which is used to diagnose benign paroxysmal positional vertigo.

Dix became a Doctor of Medicine in 1957, and worked at the National Hospital until her retirement in 1976. She authored over 100 publications in the field of neuro-otology and won the Royal Society of Medicine's Norman Gamble Research Prize in 1980. She died on 9 December 1991, aged 89.
