= LaVonne Bergstrom =

American otolaryngologist

- Born: LaVonne Bernadene Bergstrom; October 17, 1928; Erskine, Minnesota
- Died: January 10, 2001 (age 72); Los Angeles, California
- Occupations: Surgeon, otolaryngologist, professor
- Known for: President, American Auditory Society (1987)

LaVonne Bernadene Bergstrom (October 17, 1928 – January 10, 2001) was an American surgeon, otolaryngologist, and medical school professor. She was president of the American Auditory Society in 1987.

== Early life and education ==
Bergstrom was born in Erskine, Minnesota and raised in Wadena, Minnesota, the daughter of Harry Bergstrom and Clara Bjornson Bergstrom. Her father was a store manager, born in Sweden. She earned a bachelor's degree in journalism from University of Minnesota in 1950, and a medical degree from Minnesota's School of Medicine in 1957.

== Career ==
After medical school, Bergstrom was commissioned as a Presbyterian medical missionary, and spent three years as a physician in Embudo, New Mexico. From 1961 to 1965, she was medical director of the Sangre de Cristo Medical Unit in San Luis, Colorado. Both the Embudo and Sangre de Cristo sites were mission programs operated by the Presbyterian Board of National Missions.

Bergstrom completed a residency in otolaryngology at the University of Colorado in the mid-1960s. In 1975, she joined the faculty of the University of California, Los Angeles (UCLA), and in 1979 she achieved the rank of professor there. She specialized in pediatric otolaryngology and congenital syndromes affecting hearing. Rosenberg-Bergstrom syndrome, a genetic condition which includes renal insufficiency and deafness, is named for her and for her colleague Alan L. Rosenberg. She was associate director of the Hope for Hearing Medical Foundation. She retired from UCLA in 1989.

Bergstrom was on the board of the Colorado Medical Audiology Workshop when it was established in 1974. She was the first woman physician to become a full member of the American Otological Society, inducted in 1977. Also in 1977, she was elected to membership in the Triological Society, and won the society's Fowler Award for her thesis on osteogenesis imperfecta. She served as president of the American Auditory Society in 1987.

== Publications ==
Bergstrom's research was published in academic journals including The New England Journal of Medicine, The Laryngoscope, Otolaryngology–Head and Neck Surgery, Annals of Otology, Rhinology, and Laryngology, The Journal of Pediatrics, Clinical Orthopaedics and Related Research, International Journal of Pediatric Otorhinolaryngology, and Clinics in Dermatology.

- "Hyperuricemia and Neurologic Deficits — A Family Study" (1970, with Alan L. Rosenberg, Todd Troost, and Bruce A. Bartholomew)
- "Temporal Bone Findings in Trisomy 18 Syndrome" (1970, with Isamu Sando and Raymond P. Wood II)
- "Rhinocerebral and Otologic Mucormycosis" (1970, with William G. Hemenway and Roger A. Barnhart)
- "Familial hand abnormality and sensori-neural deafness: A new syndrome" (1971, with Janet M. Stewart)
- "Otologic Manifestations of Acrocephalosyndactyly" (1972, with Lewis Neblett and William G. Hemenway)
- "Hearing Loss in Renal Disease: Clinical and Pathological Studies" (1973, with Pat Jenkins, Isamu Sando, and Gerald M. English)
- "The Lightning-Damaged Ear" (1974, with Lewis Neblett and Isamu Sando)
- "External auditory atresia and the deleted chromosome" (1974, with Janet M. Stewart and Barbara Kenyon)
- "Temporal Bone Histopathological Findings in Trisomy 13 Syndrome" (1975, with Isamu Sando, Alberto Leiberman, Soji Izumi, and Raymond P. Wood II)
- "Sudden deafness and facial palsy from metastatic bronchogenic carcinoma" (1977, with Isamu Sando and Bruce B. Baker)
- "Pathology of Congenital Deafness: Present Status and Future Priorities" (1980)
- "Pendred's Syndrome with Atypical Features" (1980)
- "Continuing management of conductive hearing loss during language development" (1980)
- "Renal Disease: Its Pathology, Treatment, and Effects on the Ear" (1980, with Patricia Thompson and Isamu Sando)
- "Fragile Bones and Fragile Ears" (1981)
- "Syndromes Associated with Congenital Facial Paralysis" (1981, with Bruce B. Baker)
- "Laryngeal papillomatosis: Recurrence after 33-year remission" (1982)
- "Hearing loss in pediatric renal patients" (1983, with Patricia Thompson)
- "Early childhood education: a means to earlier diagnosis of hearing impairment in the multihandicapped" (1983, with Annette Tessier)
- "Posterior choanal atresia: A syndromal disorder" (1984, with Othella Owens)
- "Cicatricial pemphigoid of upper digestive and respiratory tracts" (1987)

== Personal life ==
Bergstrom lived in Manhattan Beach, California, in her later years. She had Pick's disease, a form of dementia, for more than a decade before she died in 2001, at the age of 72, in Los Angeles, California.
