= Shell nail syndrome =

- Specialty: Dermatology, pulmonology
- Symptoms: clubbed fingernails
- Causes: bronchiectasis, hereditary factors, cardiopulmonary disorders, gastrointestinal disorders, onycholysis
- Diagnostic method: X-ray
- Differential diagnosis: clubbed fingernails, Crohn's disease, Hapalonychia

Shell nail syndrome is a medical condition defined by the concurrence of large, rounded fingernails and bronchiectasis. Despite the visual similarity between the two conditions, shell nail syndrome and clubbed fingernails are opposites. Shell nail syndrome results from atrophy to the nail bed, whereas clubbed fingernails results from a bulbous, hypertrophic growth of soft tissue. The concurrence of the syndrome and bronchiectasis is well-established, however the exact causes of the deformity remains unknown. The syndrome has been observed affecting both the hands and larger toenails.

The link between shell nail syndrome and bronchiectasis is present within the first description of the syndrome. The patient, a 37-year-old-woman admitted to hospital, recounts first noticing a "persistent dystrophy" of her fingernails at age five, this occurring one year after developing severe whooping cough followed by pneumonia. A 2013 Clinics in Dermatology publication defines the disease as "nails [which] resemble clubbed nails with the exception of the distal nail bed, which is atrophic rather than hypertrophied and bulbous."

== Cause and diagnosis ==
At present, the specific cause of shell nail syndrome is unknown. American doctors Chalmers E. Cornelius and Walter B. Shelley first characterized the morphogenesis of the condition in a 1967 Archives of Dermatology publication, stating: "this disorder can be explained by the production of a curved nail by a normal nail matrix which grows out as a shell to thus form a roof over the atrophic process of the more acral portions of the digit." This description of how the nail "grows out as a shell" to cover the atrophied nail bed is where the syndrome takes its name. Diagnosis of shell nail syndrome is performed by x-ray of the patient's distal phalanges. A side view of a fingertip affected by shell nail syndrome will reveal an air space between the nail and nail bed. The first description of the syndrome contains diagnosis by removal of the nail plate. Shell nail syndrome is commonly bilateral due to its concurrence with pulmonary, cardiac, and gastrointestinal diseases. The syndrome can be slow to develop, occurring without the patient's notice for multiple months.

== Treatment and prognosis ==
There is currently no specific treatment for shell nail syndrome. Within the account of Cornelius and Shelly, the only treatment prescribed, a two-month course of griseofulvin, "failed to produce any change in her nail dystrophy."

== Epidemiology and History ==
Whereas the earliest description of nail clubbing as a sign of disease is from Hippocrates, the diagnostic methods needed to confirm shell nail syndrome (x-ray or removal of the nail plate) have only been used since first described in Cornelius and Shelly's 1967 account: "On review of the world's literature, we failed to find a report of nail dystrophy similar to this one." This first account of the syndrome describes a 37-year-old white female undergoing therapy for bronchiectasis. The doctors noted that "All of the fingernails showed a peculiar deformity characterized by excessive longitudinal curvature of the nail plate." It was noted that the disease was only observed on her fingers and larger toenails, the smaller ones "essentially normal."

Dr. G. F. Donald of St. Peters, South Australia recounts three cases to Cornelius in a 1969 publication: "One was a sporadic case and the others were in twin sisters, both of whom had had lifelong bronchiectasis which we presumed to be due to congenital faults in the bronchial tree. In all three, there had been this progressive dystrophy of the nails which you illustrate so beautifully. We have presumed that the nail dystrophy and the congenital change leading to chronic bronchiectasis are allied, but a lack of clear-cut proof had never bothered to record it." Cornelius provides this as support for the "contention that the nail changes and the lung pathology are related in some unknown way."

== See also ==
- Nail clubbing
- Bronchiectasis
- Hapalonychia
