= Cawthorne-Cooksey exercises =

Cawthorne-Cooksey exercises are exercises described in the 1940s to treat soldiers who had suffered injuries that resulted in balance problems during the war. It forms the basis of the Epley maneuver which is the modern treatment of benign paroxysmal positional vertigo.
