= Mary Despina Lekas =

American otolaryngologist (1928–2023)

- Born: May 13, 1928; Worcester, Massachusetts
- Died: January 24, 2023 (aged 94); East Providence, Rhode Island
- Education: Boston University
- Occupations: Physician, otolaryngologist, medical school professor

Mary Despina Lekas Picozzi (May 13, 1928 – January 24, 2023) was an American physician. She was head of otolaryngology and Surgeon-in-Chief at Rhode Island Hospital from 1983 to 1996, professor of Clinical Otolaryngology at Brown University's Alpert Medical School, and president of the New England Otolaryngological Society.

== Early life and education ==
Lekas was born in Worcester, Massachusetts, the daughter of Spyridon "Peter" Lekas and Marciny S. Manoliou Lekas. Both of her parents were born in Greece. She graduated from Clark University in 1949, and from Boston University; she earned her medical degree from the University of Athens. In 1996, she received an honorary doctorate from Clark University.

== Career ==
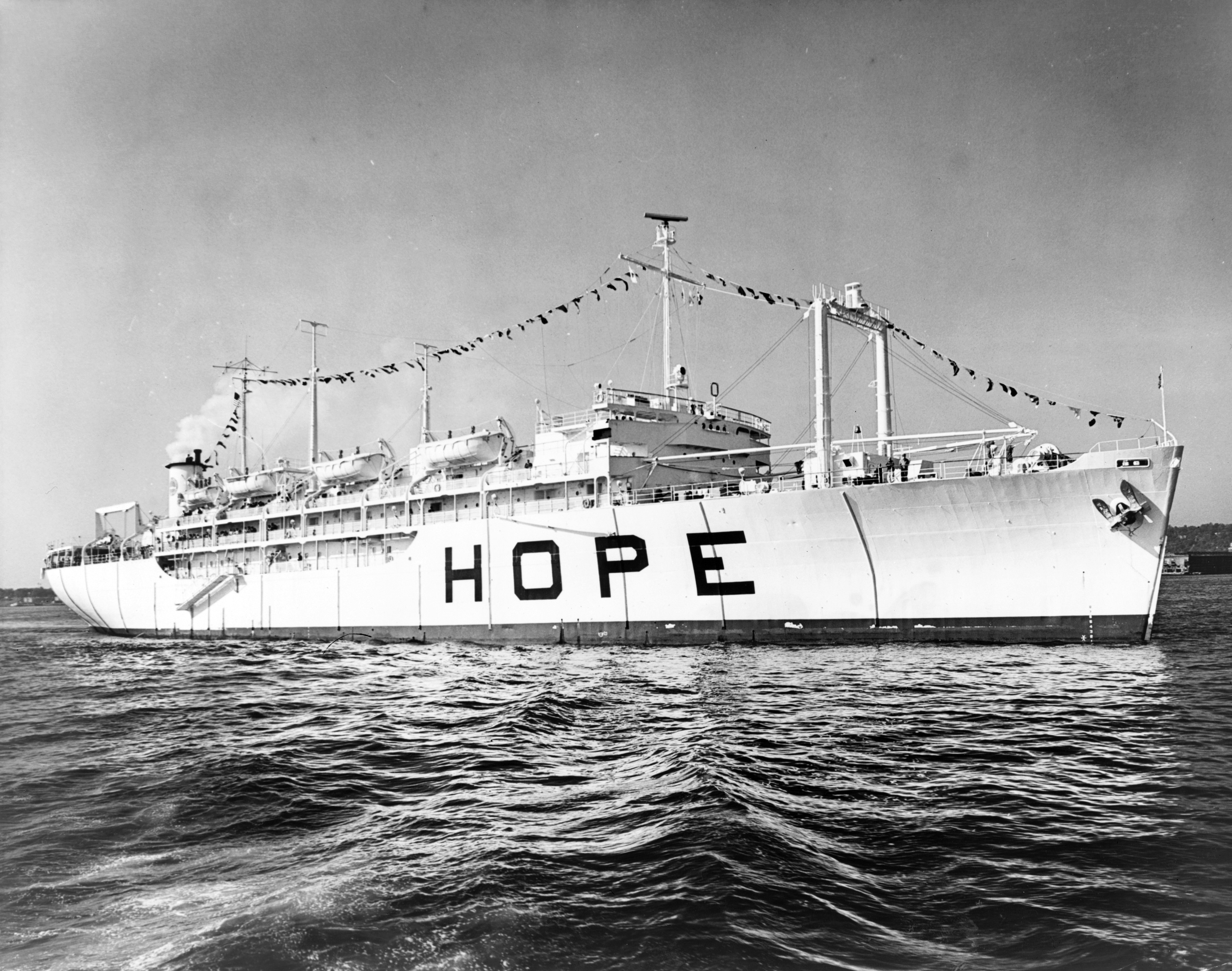
Mary D. Lekas was a surgeon aboard the S. S. Hope for ten months in 1968, while it was stationed in Ceylon.

Lekas was the first woman surgeon at Rhode Island Hospital, specializing in head and neck procedures. In 1968, she spent ten months aboard a hospital ship, working for the People to People Health Foundation (Project HOPE) in Ceylon. She was Rhode Island Hospital's head of otolaryngology and Surgeon-in-Chief at from 1983 to 1996, She was a professor of Clinical Otolaryngology at the Alpert Medical School at Brown University. She was elected president of the New England Otolaryngological Society in 1980, the first woman to hold that executive position. She was a fellow of the Triological Society, and was named Rhode Island's Woman Physician of the Year in 1992. She retired in 1996.

In 2003, Lekas donated over a million dollars to establish the Dr. Mary Despina Lekas, M.D. D.Sc. Endowed Chair in Biology at Clark University. She received the 2006 Metropolis of Boston Laity Award, for her contributions to the work of the Annunciation Greek Orthodox Church of Cranston, Rhode Island.

== Publications ==
Lekas's research appeared in academic journals including Otolaryngology–Head and Neck Surgery, The New England Society of Allergy Proceedings, The Rhode Island Medical Journal, The Laryngoscope, Ear, Nose, and Throat Journal, and The American Journal of Rhinology.

- "Iontophoresis Treatment" (1979)
- "Rhinocerebral Mucormycosis Presenting As An Orbital Apex Syndrome: Case Report" (1982, with William G. Tsiaras and Anthony J. Barone)
- "Surgery on patients with hemostatic disorders" (1982, with Joseph Dibenedetto Jr., Peter S. Smith, and Kirtikant P. Kantesaria)
- "Reconstruction of post-traumatic sinus osteomyelitis" (1984, with Paul T. Welch)
- "Surgery on patients with malignant hyperthermia" (1986, with Alan Weissburg and Teresita Padre-Mendoza)
- "Sublabial Surgical Approach for Naso-Antro-Sphenoidal Inverted Papilloma: A Seven-Year Follow-up" (1987)
- "The Nasal Gateway for Pituitary Surgery" (1988)
- "Predicting bleeding in common ear, nose, and throat procedures: a prospective study" (1990, with Peter S. Smith and P. J. Orchard)
- "Rhinitis during pregnancy and rhinitis medicamentosa" (1992)
- "External and Middle-Ear Status Related to Evoked Otoacoustic Emission in Neonates" (1993, with Kay W. Chang, B. R. Vohr, and S. J. Norton)
- "Easy bruisability, aspirin intolerance, and response to DDAVP" (1993, with James P. Crowley)
- "Osteoma of the Base of the Tongue" (1997, with Raoulf Sayegh and Sydney D. Finkelstein)

== Personal life ==
Lekas married Harold W. Picozzi in 1972. Her husband died in 2003, and she died in 2023, at the age of 94.
