= List of people with multiple sclerosis =

This is a list of notable people with multiple sclerosis. Multiple sclerosis is a demyelinating disease in which the insulating covers of nerve cells in the brain and spinal cord are damaged. This damage disrupts the ability of parts of the nervous system to transmit signals, resulting in a range of signs and symptoms, including physical, mental, and sometimes psychiatric problems.

== Living ==
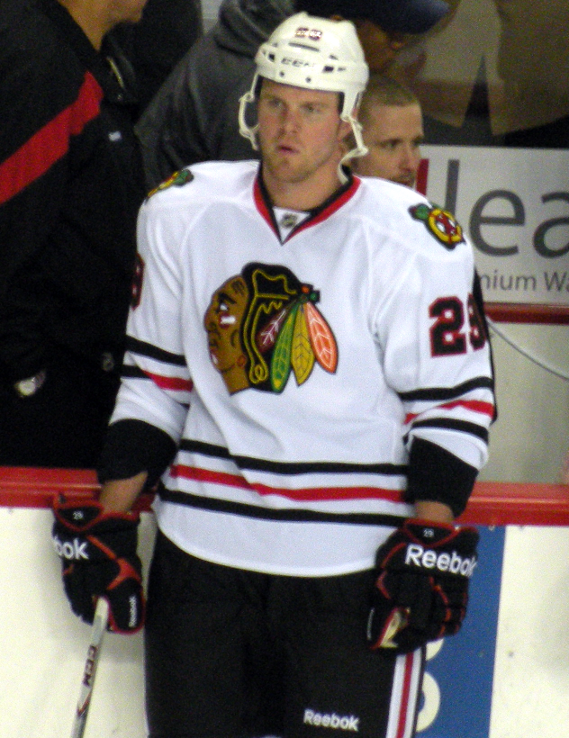
Bryan Bickell

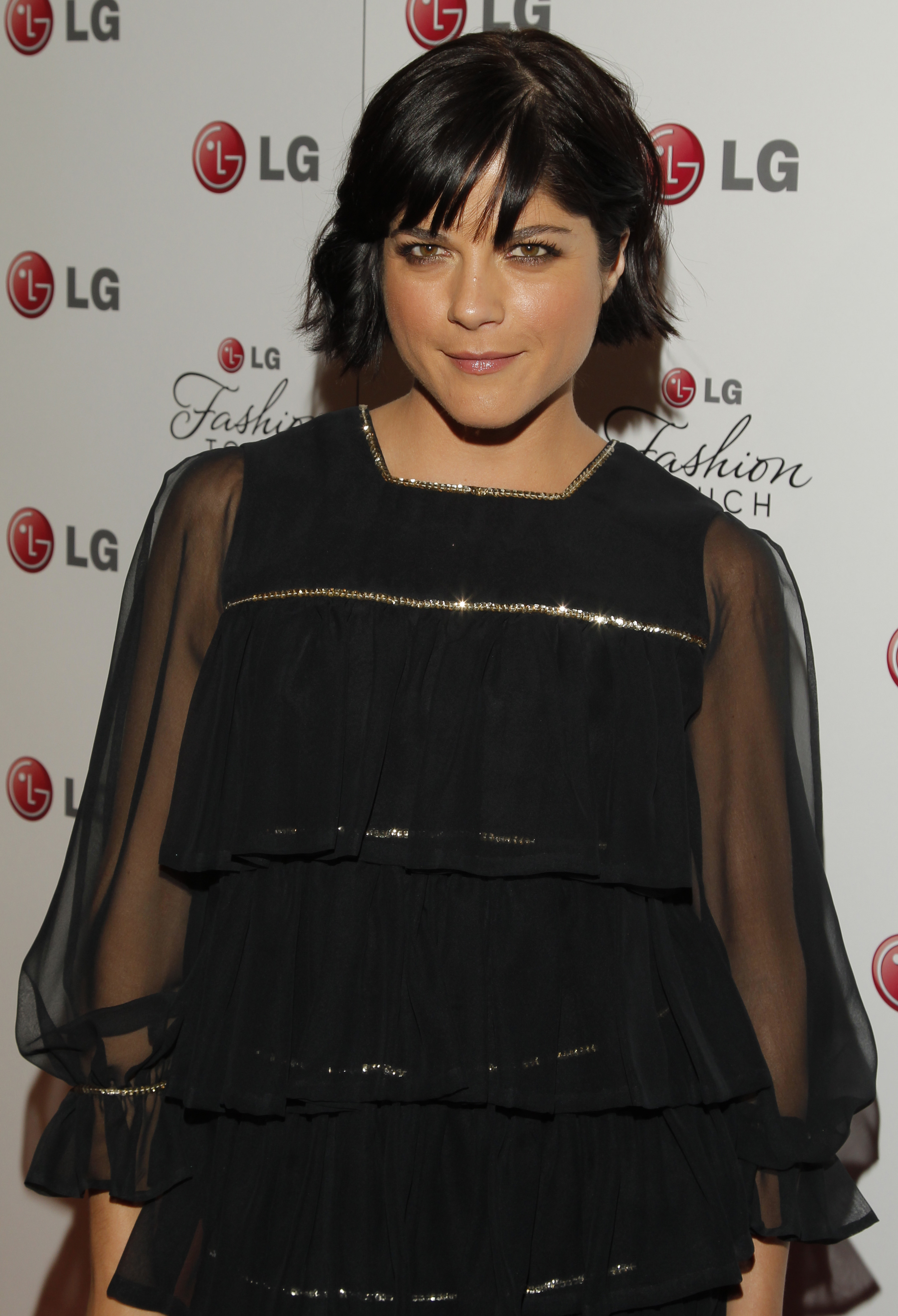
Selma Blair

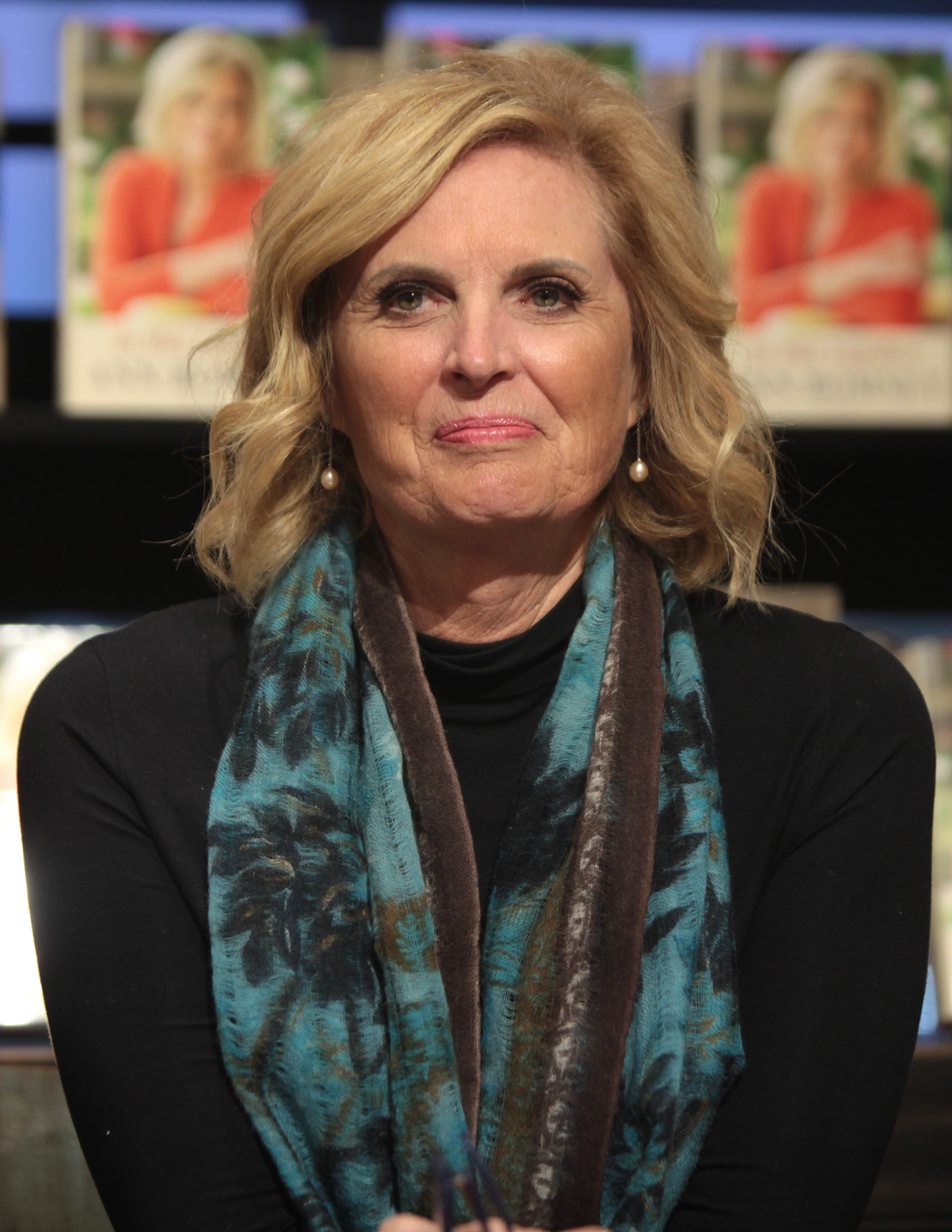
Ann Romney

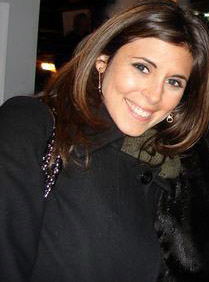
Jamie-Lynn Sigler

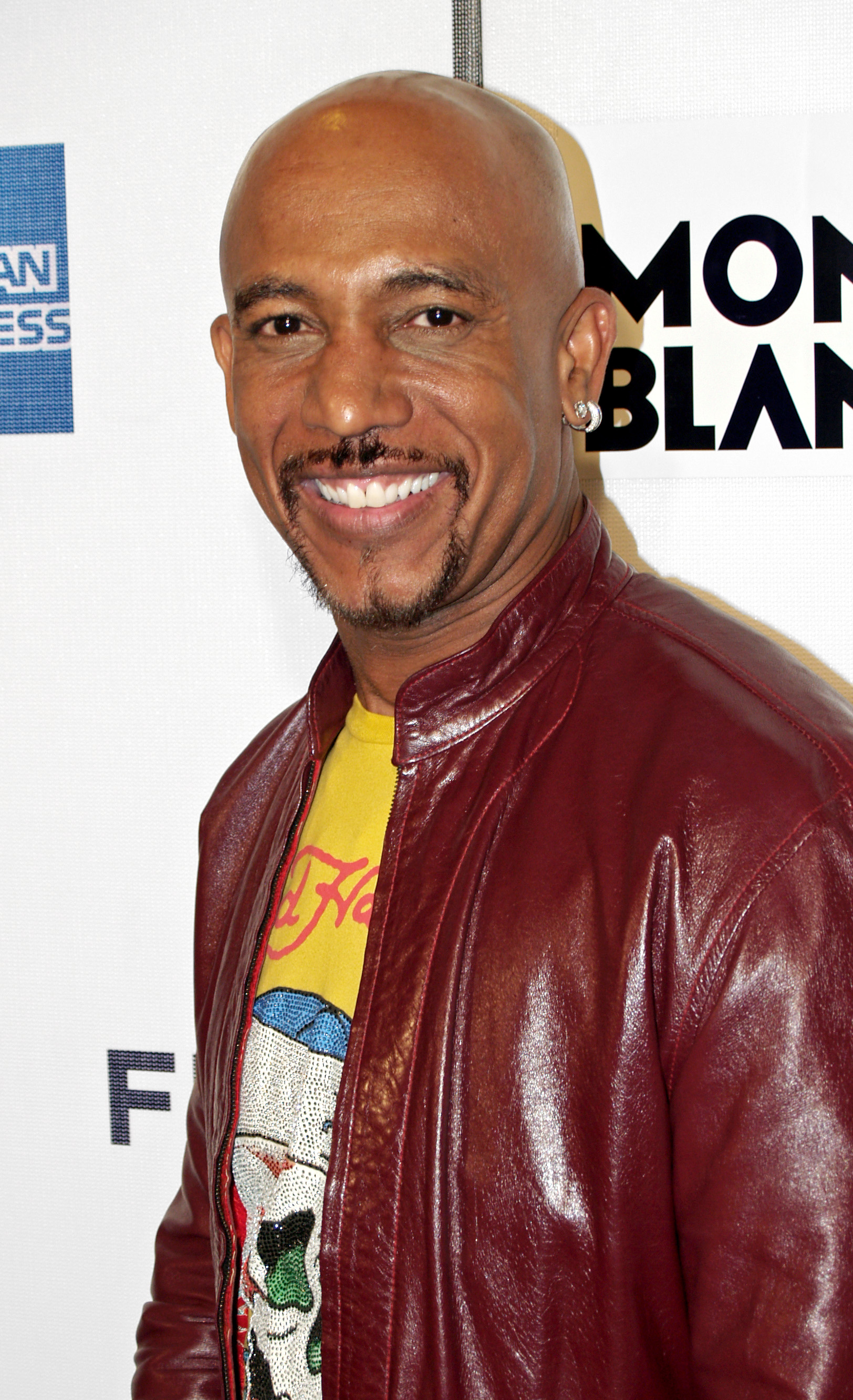
Montel Williams

- 40 (born 1983), Canadian record producer
- Masta Ace (born 1966), American rapper and record producer
- Fleur Agema (born 1976), Dutch politician
- Art Alexakis (born 1962), American guitarist (Everclear)
- Iman Ali (born 1980), Pakistani model and actress
- Javier Artero (born 1975), Spanish footballer
- Jemma Barsby (born 1995), Australian cricketer
- Trevor Bayne (born 1991), American racing driver
- Jeff Beal (born 1963), American composer
- Stan Belinda (born 1966), American baseball player
- Bryan Bickell (born 1986), Canadian ice hockey player
- Selma Blair (born 1972), American actress
- David Blatt (born 1959), American-Israeli basketball executive
- Bill Bradbury (born 1949), American politician
- Emma Caulfield (born 1973), American actress
- Neil Cavuto (born 1958), American news anchor
- Exene Cervenka (born 1956), American singer
- Benjamin Cohen (born 1982), English web developer and journalist
- Spike Cohen (born 1982), American political activist
- Kadeena Cox (born 1991), British parathlete
- Janice Dean (born 1970), Canadian-American meteorologist
- Malu Dreyer (born 1961), German politician
- Donna Edwards (born 1958), American politician
- Lola Falana (born 1942), American singer and actress
- Tim Ferguson (born 1963), Australian comedian
- Mayte Garcia (born 1973), American dancer and singer
- Siedah Garrett (born 1960), American singer
- Golriz Ghahraman (born 1981), Iranian-New Zealand politician
- Alejandro Giammattei (born 1956), Guatemalan politician, president of Guatemala
- Karolina Gruszka (born 1980), Polish actress
- Ed Hannigan (born 1951), American comic book artist
- Rick Hardcastle (born 1956), American rancher and politician
- Josh Harding (born 1984), Canadian ice hockey player
- Alastair Hignell (born 1955), English rugby player and cricketer
- Tamia Hill (born 1975), Canadian singer
- Jennifer Holliday (born 1960), American singer and actress
- Florian Homm (born 1959), German businessman
- M. J. Hyland (born 1968), English author
- Tomoya Ito (born 1963), Japanese parathlete
- George Jelinek (born 1954), Australian physician
- Paul Jessup (born 1977), writer and game developer
- Jonathan Katz (born 1946), American comedian and actor
- John King (born 1963), American journalist
- J. Michael Kosterlitz (born 1943), Scottish-American physicist, Nobel Prize laureate
- Laurie Clements Lambeth (born 1968), American poet
- Emma Lundh (born 1989), Swedish footballer
- David Maclean (born 1953), Scottish politician
- Fiona Mactaggart (born 1953), English politician
- Nader Mashayekhi (born 1958), Iranian composer
- Michael McCary (born 1971), American singer (Boyz II Men)
- Rachel Miner (born 1980), American actress
- Lorna Jean Moorhead (born 1975), American author and health columnist
- Mikey Neumann (born 1982), American video game developer and YouTuber
- Serdar Ortaç (born 1970), Turkish singer and composer
- Jack Osbourne (born 1985), English-America media personality
- Alice Sara Ott (born 1988), German pianist
- Paul Pelland (born 1968), English motorcyclist
- Ann Romney (born 1949), American equestrian and political figure
- Curt Schreiner (born 1967), American biathlete
- Jordan Sigalet (born 1981), Canadian ice hockey player and coach
- Jamie-Lynn Sigler (born 1981), American actress
- Tom Six (born 1973), Dutch filmmaker
- Aaron Solowoniuk (born 1974), Canadian drummer (Billy Talent)
- Tiger Tim Stevens (born 1952), Scottish disc jockey
- Kelly Sutton (born 1971), American racecar driver
- Jim Sweeney (born 1955), English actor and comedian
- Saija Varjus (born 1965), Finnish musician
- Terry Wahls (born 1955), American physician
- Clay Walker (born 1969), American singer
- Grem Warrington (born 1970), Australian musician
- Montel Williams (born 1956), American television host
- Victoria Williams (born 1958), American singer
- Chris Wright (born 1989), American professional basketball player
- Ivaylo Yordanov (born 1968), Bulgarian footballer

== Deceased ==
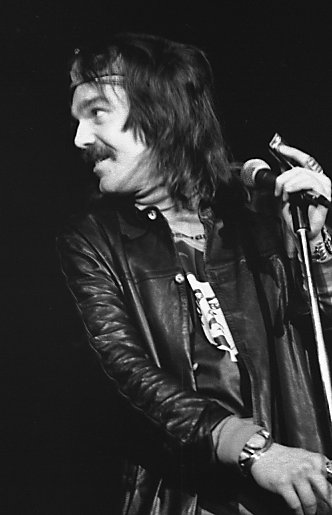
Captain Beefheart

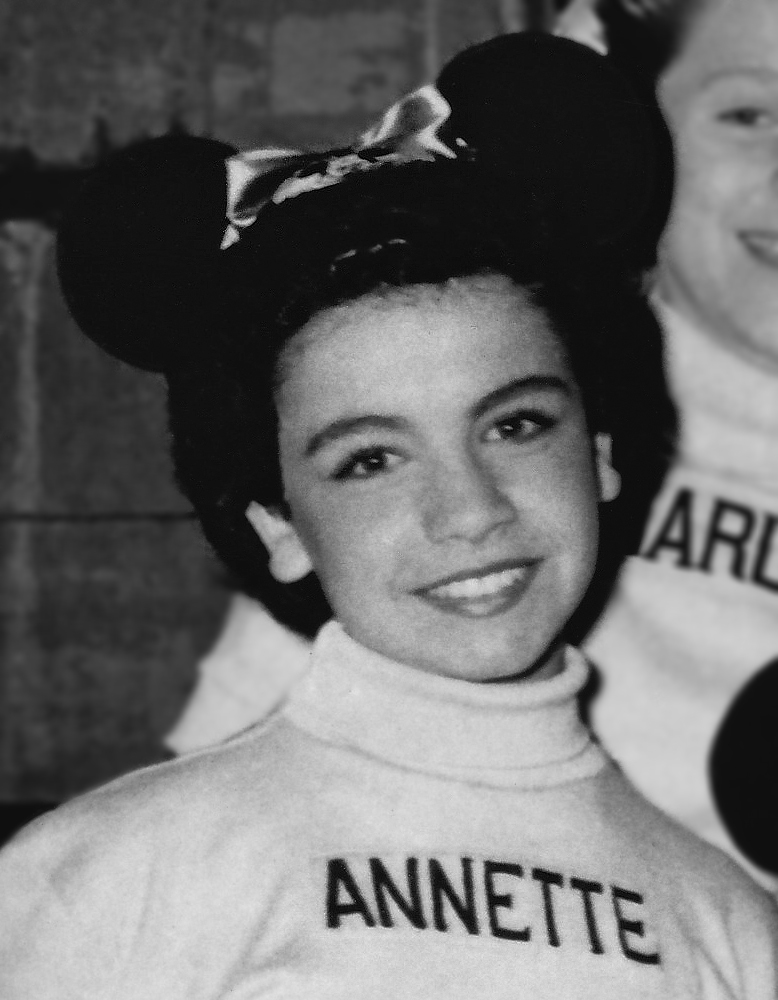
Annette Funicello

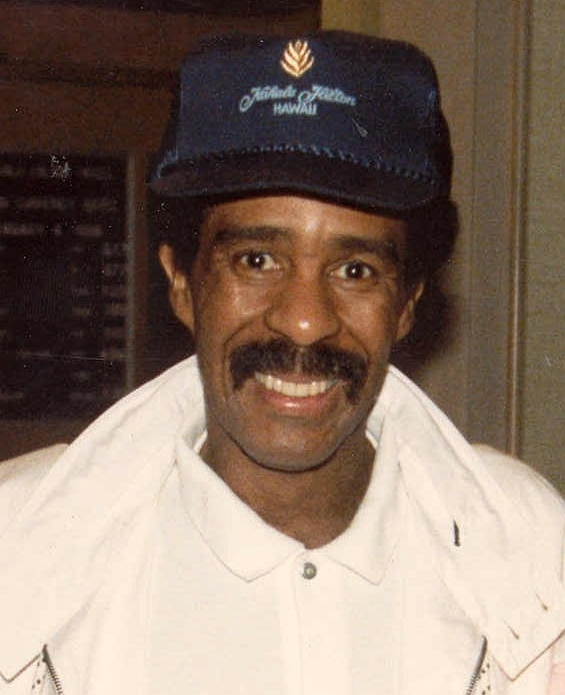
Richard Pryor

- Christine Amphlett (1959–2013), Australian singer
- Ole Anderson (1942–2024), American professional wrestler
- Dave Balon (1938–2007), Canadian ice hockey player
- W. N. P. Barbellion (1889–1919), English diarist
- Captain Beefheart (1941–2010), American singer
- Madelaine Ray Brown (1898–1968), American medical researcher
- Clive Burr (1957–2013), English drummer (Iron Maiden)
- Robert F. Coleman (1954–2014), American mathematician
- Joan Didion (1934–2021), American writer
- Tamara Dobson (1947–2006), American actress
- Jacqueline du Pré (1945–1987), English cellist
- Marie Dubois (1937–2014), French actress
- Stanley Elkin (1930–1995), American novelist
- Annette Funicello (1942–2013), American actress and singer
- Teri Garr (1944–2024), American actress
- Jean Griswold (1930–2017), American businesswoman
- Marcel Grossmann (1878–1936), Austro-Hungarian physicist and mathematician
- Will Cullen Hart (1971–2024), American musician and painter
- Carlos Hathcock (1942–1999), American sniper
- Stuart Henry (1942–1995), Scottish disc jockey
- Jimmie Heuga (1943–2010), American alpine ski racer
- John Hicklenton (1967–2010), English comic book artist
- Raymond Edward Johnson (1911–2001), American actor
- Barbara Jordan (1936–1996), American politician
- Michael Kamen (1948–2003), American film composer
- Alan Lancaster (1949–2021), English bassist (Status Quo)
- David Lander (1947–2020), American actor and comedian
- Ronnie Lane (1946–1997), English bassist (Small Faces)
- Margaret Leighton (1922–1976), English actress
- Sydney Omarr (1926–2003), American astrologer
- Alan Osmond (1949–2026), American singer (The Osmonds)
- Richard Pryor (1940–2005), American comedian and actor
- Richard Queen (1951–2002), American diplomat held hostage in Iran during the Iranian hostage crisis.
- Madlyn Rhue (1935–2003), American actress
- Keith Roberts (1935–2000), English author
- Alberto Santos-Dumont (1873–1932), Brazilian inventor
- Arleen Sorkin (1955–2023), American actress
- Sue Thomas (1950–2022), American FBI agent
- Marjorie J. Vold (1913–1991), American chemist
- Paul Wellstone (1944–2002), American politician
