= Metairie Park Country Day School =

Prep school in Metairie, Louisiana, US

Location
- 300 Park Rd; Metairie, Louisiana 70005; United States
- Coordinates: 29°58′57″N 90°7′56″W

Information
- Type: Private, nondenominational, co-educational
- Established: 1929
- Head of school: Rob Hereford
- Faculty: 79 (43 with advanced degrees)
- Grades: Pre K-12
- Enrolment: 750 (Pre-K through Grade 12)
- Average class size: 4–18 depending on the subject and division level
- Student to teacher ratio: 8:1
- Campus size: 14 acres (5.7 ha)
- Colors: Red and Blue
- Mascot: Cajuns
- Accreditation: Independent Schools Association of the Southwest, National Association of Independent Schools
- Tuition: $25,120 (2023-24, high school)
- Phone: (504) 849–3101
- Website: www.mpcds.com

Metairie Park Country Day School is a private, nondenominational, co-educational college preparatory school in Metairie, Louisiana, with classes in grades Pre-Kindergarten–12. The 15-acre (6.1 ha) campus is located in the Old Metairie section of Metairie, Louisiana.

== Campus ==
The campus covers 15 acres (6.1 ha) with 23 buildings (including one gym and 3 acres (1.2 ha) of athletic playing fields).

Until the 1950s it had a boarding facility.

== Academics ==
Country Day offers education for students in grades Pre-kindergarten through 12th grade, organized into Lower, Middle and Upper Schools. At grade 3 the option to join the Orchestra is provided and at grade 4, children can join the chorus or band. Choice of foreign languages are offered from Kindergarten to 12th grade and children in Pre-K undergo one semester of French and one semester of Spanish. From grade 9 onward there are honors options for high-performing students in regards to French and Spanish and from grade 10 onwards students are offered the choice of taking Mandarin as opposed to the two other offered languages.

The school is a member of the Independent Schools Association of the Southwest and the National Association of Independent Schools.

== Notable alumni ==
- Walker Hines, former Democratic/GOP state representative, New Orleans
- E. D. Hirsch, professor and educational theorist
- Nicholas Lemann 1972, staff writer, The New Yorker Magazine, Dean Emeritus of the Faculty of Journalism at Columbia University
- Graham Patrick Martin, actor
- Robert H. Miller 1965, American surgeon and executive director of the American Board of Otolaryngology
- Henry Furlow Owsley III 1973, investment banker, CEO of Gordian Group, LLC and managing partner of Bacchus Capital Management
- Joe Pasternack, college basketball head coach at UC Santa Barbara
- Micah Pellerin, former NFL player
- Matthew Randazzo V, writer
- Peter M. Wolf, author
- Aimee Adatto Freeman, Louisiana House of Representatives, District 98
- Nike Georges, son of John Georges and president of Georges Enterprises
