= DizzyFIX =

Home medical device for treating vertigo

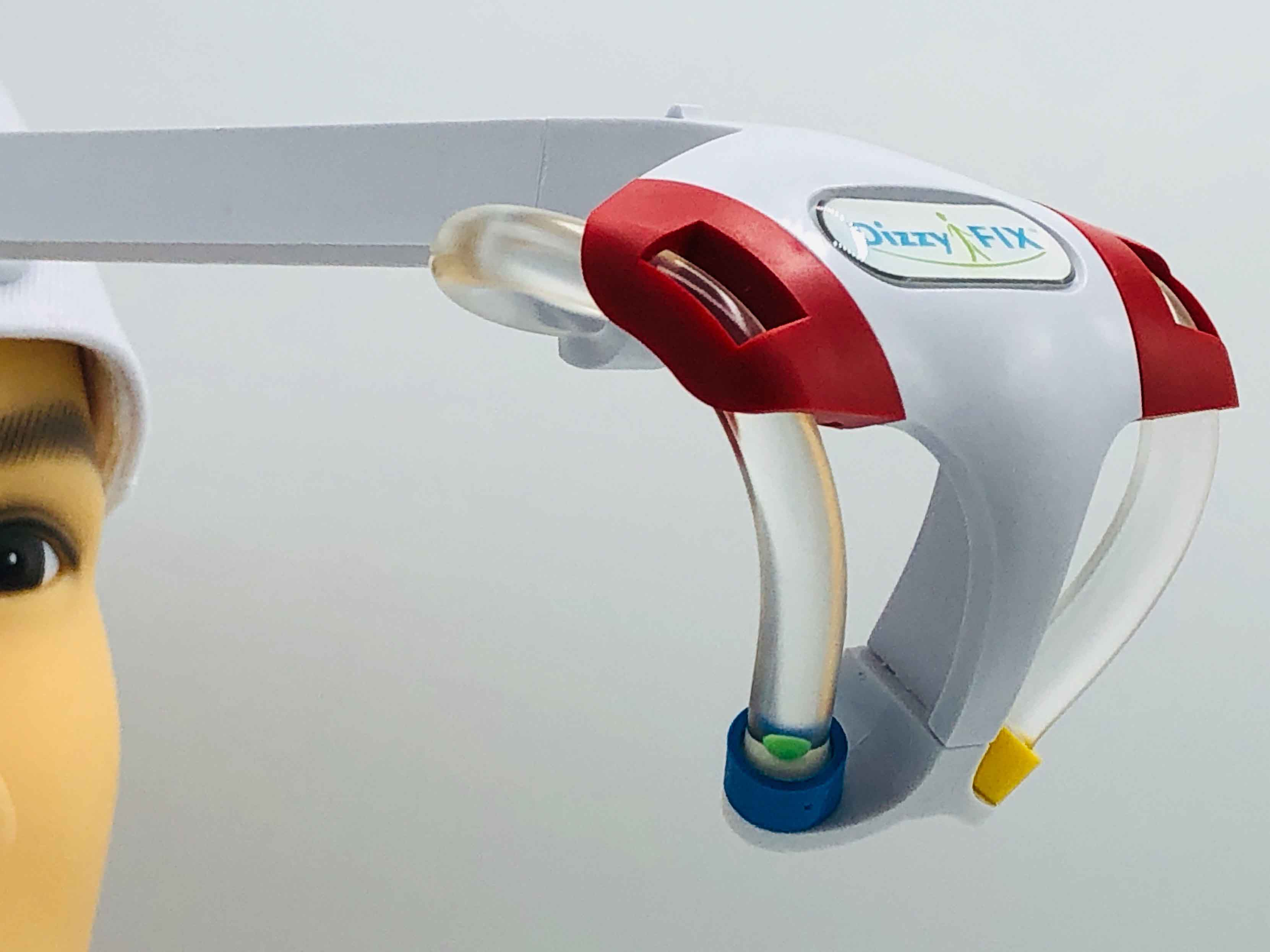
The DizzyFIX device

The DizzyFIX is a home medical device designed to assist in the treatment of benign paroxysmal positional vertigo (BPPV) and its associated vertigo. The device is a head-worn representation of semi-circular canals. The device is filled with fluid and a particle representing the otoconia (loose hard particles) associated with BPPV. The device works like a visual set of instructions and guides the user through the treatment maneuver for BPPV. This maneuver is called the particle repositioning maneuver or Epley maneuver.

== How it works ==
The device is a head-worn representation of semi-circular canals. The device is filled with fluid and a particle representing the otoconia (loose hard particles) associated with BPPV. The device works like a visual set of instructions and guides the user through the treatment maneuver for BPPV. This maneuver is called the particle repositioning maneuver or Epley maneuver.

== Benign paroxysmal positional vertigo ==
Nystagmus.

Benign paroxysmal positional vertigo (BPPV) is the most common cause of peripheral vertigo. It can be characterized by three main symptoms: positional onset, spinning dizziness and short-lived symptoms. The primary diagnostic maneuver is the Dix-Hallpike test which elicits the cardinal sign associated with BPPV, rotatory nystagmus.

== Background ==
The DizzyFIX was originally developed by otolaryngologists to assist in the long-term treatment of patients with a known history of recurrent BPPV. BPPV is frequently highly recurrent with rates as high as 50%. Radtke et al. have suggested that home treatment is both safe and effective when training is adequate but that the key cause of failure of the home treatment is an imperfect repositioning maneuver. As a result of failed home treatments, the DizzyFIX was developed to assist patients in the performance of a correct particle repositioning maneuver. Research to date indicates that the use of the device is correlated with a correct particle repositioning maneuver.

== See also ==
- Vestibular system
