= Charles Skinner Hallpike =

English otologist

Charles Skinner Hallpike CBE, FRS
- Born: July 19, 1900; Murree, British India (now Pakistan)
- Died: September 26, 1979 (aged 79)
- Education: St Paul's School (London), Guy's Hospital
- Known for: Research into Ménière's disease, describing the Dix-Hallpike test
- Spouse: Barbara Lee Anderson (m. 1935)
- Children: 3
- Medical career
- Profession: Physician, Researcher
- Field: Otology
- Institutions: Guy's Hospital, Cheltenham General Hospital; Middlesex Hospital; Medical Research Council; National Hospital for Neurology and Neurosurgery
- Sub-specialties: Hearing, balance, inner ear disorders

Charles Skinner "C.S." Hallpike, CBE, FRS (19 July 1900 – 26 September 1979) was an English otologist.

He was born in Murree, India, a hill station now in Pakistan, the son of Frank Hallpike. The family returned to the UK when he was 3 years old. He attended St Paul's School (London) as a classical scholar and then Guy's Hospital in 1919 on an Arts scholarship. He qualified MRCS and LRCP in 1924. He then obtained an MB of the University of London in 1926 and was elected FRCS in 1931.

He was House Surgeon at the Ear, Nose and Throat Department of Guy's Hospital and the Cheltenham General Hospital. He became a Research Fellow at the Middlesex Hospital in 1929 where he specialised in the physical aspects of hearing and balance.

In 1940, he moved to join the Medical Research Council team at the National Hospital for Neurology and Neurosurgery in Queen Square, London as Assistant Aural Surgeon and later Aural Physician, which post he held until his retirement in 1967.

He published with Sir Hugh Cairns in 1938 a ground-breaking paper on the causes of Ménière's disease. He is best remembered for describing the Dix-Hallpike test used in the diagnosis of benign positional vertigo.

In 1935, he had married Barbara Lee Anderson; they had two sons and a daughter.
