= Calvin Trillin bibliography =

This is a list of works by American author Calvin Trillin.

== Non-fiction ==
- An Education in Georgia: Charlayne Hunter, Hamilton Holmes, and the Integration of the University of Georgia. New York: Viking. 1964. ISBN 978-0820313887.
- U.S. Journal. New York: E.P. Dutton and Co. 1971. ISBN 978-0525226604.
- American Fried: Adventures of a Happy Eater. New York: Doubleday. 1974. ISBN 978-0385004404.
- Alice, Let's Eat: Further Adventures of a Happy Eater. New York: Random House. 1978. ISBN 978-0765198310.
- Uncivil Liberties. Boston: Ticknor and Fields. 1982. ISBN 978-0899190976.
- Third Helpings. Boston: Ticknor and Fields. 1983. ISBN 978-0899191737.
- Killings. Boston: Ticknor and Fields. 1984. ISBN 978-0399591402.
- With All Disrespect: More Uncivil Liberties. Boston: Ticknor and Fields. 1985. ISBN 978-0899193533.
- If You Can't Say Something Nice. Boston: Ticknor and Fields. 1987. ISBN 978-0899195315.
- Travels with Alice. Boston: Ticknor and Fields. 1989. ISBN 978-0899199108.
- Enough's Enough: And Other Rules of Life. Boston: Ticknor and Fields. 1990. ISBN 978-0899199580.
- American Stories. Boston: Ticknor and Fields. 1991. ISBN 978-0395593677.
- Remembering Denny. New York: Farrar, Straus and Giroux. 1993. ISBN 978-0374226077.
- Too Soon to Tell. New York: Farrar, Straus and Giroux. 1995. ISBN 978-0374278465.
- Messages from My Father: A Memoir. New York: Farrar, Straus and Giroux. 1996. ISBN 978-0374525088.
- Family Man. New York: Farrar, Straus and Giroux. 1998. ISBN 9780374525835.
- Feeding a Yen: Savoring Local Specialties, from Kansas City to Cuzco. New York: Random House. 2003. ISBN 978-0375508080.
- About Alice. New York: Random House. 2006. ISBN 978-1400066155.
- Trillin on Texas. Austin: University of Texas Press. 2011. ISBN 978-0292726505.
- Quite Enough of Calvin Trillin: Forty Years of Funny Stuff. New York: Random House. 2011. ISBN 978-1400069828.
- Jackson, 1964: And Other Dispatches from Fifty Years of Reporting on Race in America. New York: Random House. 2016. ISBN 978-0399588242.
- The Lede: Dispatches from a Life in the Press. New York: Random House. 2024. ISBN 978-0593596449.

== Novels ==
- Runestruck. New York: Little, Brown and Company. 1977. ISBN 978-0316852753.
- Floater. Boston: Ticknor and Fields. 1980. ISBN 978-0899190174.
- Tepper Isn't Going Out. New York: Random House. 2002. ISBN 978-0375758515.

== Short fiction ==
- Barnett Frummer is an Unbloomed Flower. New York: Viking. 1969. ISBN 978-0670148066.

== Poetry ==
- Deadline Poet: My Life As a Doggerelist. New York: Farrar, Straus and Giroux. 1994. ISBN 978-0374135522.
- Obliviously On He Sails: The Bush Administration in Rhyme. New York: Random House. 2004. ISBN 978-1400062881.
- A Heckuva Job: More of the Bush Administration in Rhyme. New York: Random House. 2006. ISBN 978-1400065561.
- Deciding the Next Decider: The 2008 Presidential Race in Rhyme. New York: Random House. 2008. ISBN 978-1400068289.
- Dogfight: The 2012 Presidential Campaign in Verse. New York: Random House. 2012. ISBN 978-0812993684.
- No Fair! No Fair! And Other Jolly Poems of Childhood. New York: Orchard Books. 2016. ISBN 978-0545825788.

== Essays, reporting and other contributions ==
- "Plane to Mississippi: An Encounter with Martin Luther King, Jr". Letter from Jackson. August 29, 1964. The New Yorker. Vol. 96, no. 21. August 29, 1964. pp. 16–17.
- "Breaux Bridge, Louisiana: Eating crawfish". U.S. Journal. May 20, 1972. The New Yorker. Vol. 97, no. 27. May 20, 1972. pp. 28–31.
- "Dept. of Gastronomy: By Meat Alone". The New Yorker. Vol. 84, no. 38. November 24, 2008. pp. 64–69.
- "The Talk of the Town: Digits: Try to Remember". The New Yorker. Vol. 87, no. 7. April 4, 2011. pp. 23–24.
- "Shouts & Murmurs: President Romney Meets Other World Leaders". The New Yorker. Vol. 87, no. 44. January 16, 2012. p. 31.
- "Eating Out: Land of the Seven Moles". The New Yorker. Vol. 88, no. 38. December 3, 2012. pp. 56–60.
- Wolf, Peter M. (2013). My New Orleans, Gone Away – A Memoir of Loss and Renewal. Foreword. Santa Monica, California: Dephinium Books.
- "Mozzarella story: A cheese ritual". Our Local Correspondents. The New Yorker. Vol. 89, no. 39. December 2, 2013. pp. 26–29.
- "Tamales on the Delta: A culinary festival in a world capital". U.S. Journal. The New Yorker. Vol. 89, no. 43. January 6, 2014. pp. 30–33.
- "Imaginary Mitzvahs". Shouts & Murmurs. The New Yorker. Vol. 91, no. 45. January 25, 2016. p. 37.
- "Counting Shrimp". Shouts & Murmurs. The New Yorker. 8 January 2017. ISSN 0028-792X.
- "The Irish Constellation". Shouts & Murmurs. The New Yorker. Vol. 93, no. 11. May 1, 2017. p. 27.
- "Final Cut". Personal History. The New Yorker. September 4, 2017. ISSN 0028-792X.
- "The Button: A Nuclear Fable". Shouts & Murmurs. The New Yorker. January 22, 2018. ISSN 0028-792X.
- "Dear Answer Man: Trump Edition". Shouts & Murmurs. The New Yorker. March 3, 2018. ISSN 0028-792X.
- "The Cohens at Home". Shouts & Murmurs. The New Yorker. March 31, 2018. ISSN 0028-792X.
- "Memories of the Historic Trump-Pruitt Traffic Jam". Shouts & Murmurs. The New Yorker. May 5, 2018. ISSN 0028-792X.
- "Nearby and Familiar: A Strategy for Picking Restaurants". Personal History. The New Yorker. November 21, 2018. ISSN 0028-792X.
- "No Wonder Donald Trump Kept Going Bankrupt". Shouts & Murmurs. The New Yorker. January 28, 2019. ISSN 0028-792X.
- "Phone Calls from All Over". Shouts & Murmurs. The New Yorker. July 22, 2019. ISSN 0028-792X.
- "Class Notes". Shouts & Murmurs. The New Yorker. September 2, 2019. ISSN 0028-792X.
- "My Hand-Washing Journal". Shouts & Murmurs. The New Yorker. April 3, 2020. ISSN 0028-792X.
- "A Grateful Grandfather Sheltering with His Family". Shouts & Murmurs. The New Yorker. 14 April 2020. ISSN 0028-792X.
- "Fifty Years of Friendship with Larry Kramer". Culture Desk. The New Yorker. May 29, 2020. ISSN 0028-792X.
- "Some Notes on Funniness: Going for the Laughs". Personal History. The New Yorker. Vol. 96, no. 42. December 28, 2020. pp. 30–32.
- "Florida Woman Bites Camel". The Wayward Press. The New Yorker. December 20, 2021. ISSN 0028-792X.
- "Getting Accustomed to My Second Tuxedo". Personal History. The New Yorker. 21 March 2022. ISSN 0028-792X.
