= Robert H. Miller (surgeon) =

American surgeon

Robert Harold Miller, M.D., M.B.A., F.A.C.S. (born July 2, 1947) is an American surgeon and the executive director of the American Board of Otolaryngology in Houston, Texas, U.S.A.

== Education and career ==
Miller graduated from Metairie Park Country Day School in 1965. Miller received his B.S. degree in Biology from Tulane University in New Orleans in 1969, and his M.D. degree from Tulane's School of Medicine in 1973. He was also named to the Alpha Omega Alpha Medical Honor Society that same year. He completed Otolaryngology - Head and Neck Surgery residency training in 1978 at Ronald Reagan UCLA Medical Center in Los Angeles, California, and subsequently practiced at Baylor College of Medicine in Houston. He was a fellow of Triological Society and American Laryngological Association in 1986 and 1987 respectively, since which he also became the fifth chairman of the Tulane Department of Otolaryngology - Head and Neck Surgery.

While chair of the department, he received his M.B.A. degree from the A.B. Freeman School of Business at Tulane University in 1996. A year later, he completed a Robert Wood Johnson Health Policy Fellowship in Senator John Breaux's office (Washington, DC). In 1999, he became the Dean of the University of Nevada School of Medicine. In 2002, he returned to New Orleans as a Professor of Clinical Otolaryngology, until he assumed his current position as Executive Director of the American Board of Otolaryngology in 2004. He is a member of the Board of Directors of the American Board of Otolaryngology, and served as the Executive Secretary/Treasurer of the Triological Society from 1992 to 2004. He has many publications.

In 2006, Dr. Miller had founded ETNtoday, a magazine of Triological Society, and served as its editor until his retirement in 2017.

== Publications ==
- Miller, Robert H. (1983). The surgical atlas of airway and facial trauma. Comprehensive surgical atlases in otolaryngology and head and neck surgery. Illustrated by Patrick McDonnell, David M. Bolinsky. New York: Grune & Stratton. ISBN 9780808915942. LCCN 83012725.
- Miller, Robert H.; Woodson, Gayle E.; Jankovic, Joseph (1987). "Botulinum toxin injection of the vocal fold for spasmodic dysphonia. A preliminary report". Arch. Otolaryngol. Head Neck Surg. 113 (6): 603–605. doi:10.1001/archotol.1987.01860060029009. PMID 3566940.
- Spires, James R.; Schwartz, Mary R.; Miller, Robert H. (1988). "Anaplastic thyroid carcinoma. Association with differentiated thyroid cancer". Arch. Otolaryngol. Head Neck Surg. 114 (1): 40–44. doi:10.1001/archotol.1988.01860130044012. PMID 3334817.
