= Eugene Nicholas Myers =

American oncologist and otolaryngologist

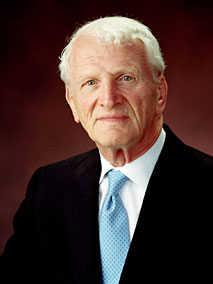
- Born: November 27, 1933 (age 92); Philadelphia, Pennsylvania
- Occupations: Doctor and educator

Eugene Nicholas Myers (born November 27, 1933) is an oncologist and otolaryngologist and a leader in the treatment of head and neck cancer. He has served on the faculty of the University of Pittsburgh School of Medicine since 1972, when he became chairman of the Department of Otolaryngology. He is the author or co-author of leading texts in the field of head and neck cancer, and has chaired and served on the boards of the preeminent societies and associations in the field.

== Early life ==
Eugene Nicholas Myers was born in Philadelphia, Pennsylvania to David and Roslyn Nicholas Myers. His father, maternal grandfather, maternal uncle, and paternal uncles all were doctors. His father was a noted ear, nose and throat specialist in Philadelphia.

== Education and training ==
Myers attended the Wharton School of the University of Pennsylvania and in 1954 received a Bachelor of Science in Economics. He earned his Doctor of Medicine degree in 1960 at Temple University. After medical school, Myers did internships with Martin Steinberg at Mt. Sinai Hospital in New York, and with J.J. Byrne at the VA Hospital on Boston. He completed a residency and a NIH Special Fellowship in Otolaryngology at Massachusetts Eye and Ear Infirmary, and then was a Teaching Fellow under Harold Schuknecht, the Harvard Medical School Chair of Otolaryngology, during the 1964-65 period. He completed his postgraduate training with a Special Fellowship in Head and Neck Surgery with John Conley at Saint Vincent's Catholic Medical Center in New York.

== Career and accomplishments ==
Myers served two years with the United States Army Medical Corps in 1965–67 at the 97th General Hospital in Frankfurt, Germany He then completed a fellowship in head and neck surgery with John J. Conley, MD, at Saint Vincent's Hospital in New York.

Myers served from 1968 to 1972 as an assistant professor of clinical otolaryngology at the University of Pennsylvania School of Medicine in Philadelphia, then became professor, chairman, and the first academic faculty member of the Department of Otolaryngology at the University of Pittsburgh in 1972. While serving in that leadership position he increased the size and quality of the school's department of otolaryngology, so that it is widely considered one of the leading programs in the world. In 2006 Myers was named distinguished professor and emeritus chair. During his 33-year tenure as chair, he introduced the department to modern head and neck surgery and cultivated a leading academic department. He estimates that he has performed more than 9,000 operations and mentored more than 150 residents and fellows. Twenty-five of his former trainees are now chairs at academic institutions. From 1972 to the present he served first as professor of clinical oncology in the Department of Oral Pathology of the University of Pittsburgh School of Dental Medicine, and then as professor in the Department of Oral and Maxillofacial Surgery at that school.

He served in various roles including chief of department, consulting staff, active staff, and courtesy staff at a number of major hospitals, including the VA Hospital, University of Pennsylvania Hospital, US Naval Hospital, Children's Hospital, and Presbyterian-University of Pennsylvania Medical Center, all in Philadelphia, and Children's Hospital of Pittsburgh, Eye and Ear Hospital, UPMC-Presbyterian Hospital, Western Pennsylvania Hospital, UPMC-Braddock Medical Center, The Rehabilitation Institute, UPMC South Side, Magee-Womens Hospital, and the Veterans Affairs Medical Center, all in Pittsburgh.

Myers has been a frequent speaker within the US and around the world. He's delivered over 500 talks before learned medical societies in the U.S. and on six continents between 1964 and 2013, starting with "Management of Otogenic Brain Abscess," at the New England Otolaryngological Society, and more recently on "Parapharyngeal Pleomorphic Adenoma" at the 3rd International Congress on Salivary Gland Diseases" in Geneva, Switzerland. He's also moderated over 200 panels during that time. He's been honored to deliver over 50 eponymous addresses, including the 2nd John Conley Lecture at Columbia University in 1999, and the 1st David Myers Distinguished Lecture (named in memory of Myers’ father) at the University of Pennsylvania in 2005.

Myers has secured multiple research grants by the U.S. federal government as well as industry organizations, including the National Institutes of Health, the National Institute of Dental and Craniofacial Research, the National Cancer Institute, the American College of Radiology, and the American Cancer Society.

== Publications ==
Myers is one of the two original editors of Cancer of the Head and Neck, now in its 5th edition, along with James Suen (and now co-edited with Michael Smith, Jeffrey Myers, and Ehab Hanna). Myers also co-edited with Charles Bluestone, Derald Brackman, and Charles Krause, the twelve volume Advances in Otolaryngology–Head and Neck Surgery. In addition, he has edited or co-edited books in the field including Tracheotomy, Plastic Reconstruction in the Head and Neck, Operative Otolaryngology-Head & Neck Surgery, Tracheotomy: Airway Management, Communication and Swallowing, Decision Making in Ear, Nose & Throat Disorders, Salivary Gland Disorders, Pearls and Pitfalls in Head and Neck Surgery, Practical Tips to Minimize Complications, and the forthcoming Master Techniques in Otolaryngology. He has also contributed almost 150 book chapters to other editors' works.

He has authored over 300 refereed articles on a broad range of topics concerning Head and Neck Cancer, Otolaryngology, Oncology, and Maxillofacial Surgery.

== Professional societies ==
Myers has played leadership roles in most of the professional and scientific societies in the field of Otolaryngology–Head and Neck Surgery, including the American Academy of Otolaryngology–Head and Neck Surgery, the American Board of Otolaryngology, the American Bronchoesophagology Association, the American College of Surgeons, the American Head and Neck Society, the American Laryngological Association, the American Laryngological, Rhinological and Otological Society, the American Medical Association, the American Otological Society, the Association for Research in Otolaryngology, the Association of Academic Departments of Otolaryngology, the Pan American Association of Oto-Rhino-Laryngology, the Society of Head and Neck Surgeons, and the Society of University Otolaryngologists.

He is an honorary member of professional societies in Brazil, Mexico, the Czech Republic, Germany, Great Britain, Hong Kong, Hungary, India, Israel, Japan, Oman, the Philippines, Scotland, South Africa, South Korea, Spain, Taiwan, and Turkey and the Caribbean Association of Otolaryngology. He was also President of the Pan-American Association of Otolaryngology–Head and Neck Surgery and is an honorary member of more than 20 overseas national societies of otolaryngology. At the 2009 IFOS World Congress, he was awarded a gold medal for his international activities. He currently serves as Honorary President of the Balkan Society of Otolaryngology and is the Regional Advisor to the Balkans for the American Academy of Otolaryngology— Head and Neck Surgery.

== Community activity ==
Myers has been a member of the Board of Directors of Eye and Ear Hospital, Eye and Ear Foundation, and University of Pittsburgh Physicians. He's served and chaired search committees for departments of Radiology, Dermatology, Medicine, Anesthesiology, Dental Medicine, Diagnostic Services, Ophthalmology, Orthopedics, Pediatrics, Pathology, and Surgery at the University of Pittsburgh.

Outside of medicine, Myers has served on the boards of many non-profit organizations, including Pennsylvania Lions Hearing Research Foundation, Support for People with Oral and Head and Neck Cancer, Family House, Opera Theater of Pittsburgh, and Global Pittsburgh.

== Personal life ==
Myers married Barbara Labov in 1956. The couple have two children – Marjorie Myers Fulbright of San Francisco, California, and Jeffrey Nicholas Myers of Houston, Texas (with whom Eugene Myers has collaborated on a number of books and articles) – and also five grandsons. Myers lives in Pittsburgh, PA and proudly supports the Pittsburgh Penguins.
