= Madelaine Ray Brown =

American neurologist

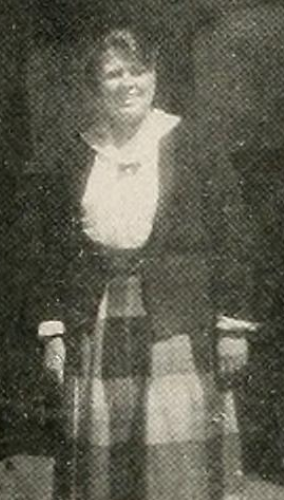
- Madelaine Ray Brown, from the 1920 yearbook of Bryn Mawr College
- Born: September 19, 1898; Providence, Rhode Island
- Died: June 14, 1968 (aged 69)
- Education: Bryn Mawr College; Brown University; Johns Hopkins University
- Occupation(s): Neurologist, medical researcher

Madelaine Ray Brown (1898 – June 14, 1968) was an American neurologist based in Boston, Massachusetts. She specialized in the treatment of Ménière's disease, multiple sclerosis, and other neurological conditions. She also had multiple sclerosis for most of her adult career, and used a wheelchair and other adaptations to maintain a full schedule of teaching and research.

== Early life and education ==
Madelaine Ray Brown was born in Providence, Rhode Island, the daughter of Robert Perkins Brown and Elizabeth Graham Ray Brown. She earned a bachelor's degree from Bryn Mawr College in 1920, a master's degree from Brown University in 1923, and a medical degree from Johns Hopkins University in 1927.

== Career ==
Brown was a neurologist and medical researcher affiliated with Cushing Veterans Hospital, New England Hospital for Women and Children, Massachusetts General Hospital, Boston City Hospital, and Tufts Medical School. She was president of the Boston Society of Psychiatry and Neurology. She received an Elizabeth Blackwell Award from the New York Infirmary in 1954, for her "brilliant scientific work". In 1957, she was honored as a Medical Woman of the Year by the American Medical Women's Association. She was one of the founding members of the Muscular Dystrophy Research Foundation.

Beyond her medical accomplishments, Brown collected antique pewter, especially pieces with Rhode Island origins, and was a charter member and treasurer of the Pewter Collectors' Club of America. She loaned several items to a major exhibition of American pewter at the Metropolitan Museum of Art in 1939.

== Publications ==
Brown published her research in scientific journals including the Science, Journal of the American Medical Association (JAMA), Annals of Internal Medicine, the Annals of Otology, Rhinology & Laryngology, Archives of Neurology and Psychiatry, Medical Clinics of North America, and the New England Journal of Medicine.

- "The effect of removal of the sympathetic chains and of the coeliac ganglia on gastric acidity" (1933)
- "The Pathology of the Gastrointestinal Tract in Pernicious Anemia and Subacute Combined Degeneration of the Spinal Cord" (1934)
- "The Medical Treatment of Ménière's Syndrome" (1937)
- "Etiologic Study of Landry's Original Case of Acute Ascending Paralysis" (1938)
- "Remissions in Multiple Sclerosis" (1939, with Tracy J. Putnam)
- "Ménière's Syndrome: Acid-Base Constitutients of the Blood: Treatment with Potassium Chloride" (1940, with John H. Talbott)
- "Alcoholic Polyneuritis: An Evaluation of the Treatment at the Boston City Hospital from 1920 through 1938" (1941)
- "Muscular Paralysis and Electrocardiographic Abnormalities: Resulting from Potassium Loss in Chronic Nephritis" (1944, with James H. Currens and John F. Marchand)
- "The Role of Arsenic in the Production of Alcoholic Polyneuritis" (1947, with James Hastings) "Paroxysmal Cerebral Dysrhythmia Following Large Doses of Potassium Chloride" (1948)
- "The Factor of Heredity in Labyrinthine Deafness and Paroxysmal Vertigo (Ménière's Syndrome)" (1949)
- "The Classification and treatment of Headache" (1951)
- "The Incidence and Heredity of Muscular Dystrophy — A Study of Seventy-One Patients Admitted to the Massachusetts General Hospital" (1951)
- "The Mechanism Involved in Polyneuritis as Exemplified by Postdiphtheric Polyneuritis" (1952)

== Personal life ==
Brown had multiple sclerosis, diagnosed in the late 1920s. In the 1950s her health began to affect her ability to travel to professional conferences, though she continued to teach, see patients, and do research by using a wheelchair, "which has been her freedom from immobility since 1954", noted a 1957 profile. She also used an adapted telephone, and a hydraulic lift for positioning needs. She died in a car accident in 1968. She left her pewter collection to the Newport Historical Society and the Rhode Island Historical Society.
