= Henry Furlow Owsley III =

American investment banker (born 1955)

- Born: 1955 (age 70–71)
- Education: Metairie Park Country Day School; Princeton University; MIT Sloan School of Management
- Occupations: Investment banker; Investor
- Spouse: Alexa "Lexi" Van de Walle
- Children: Cordell D. Owsley and Camille C. Owsley

Henry F. Owsley (born 1955) is an American investment banker. He is the founder and chief executive officer of Gordian Group LLC, an investment bank and financial advisory firm. He is also a managing partner of Bacchus Capital Management.

== Early life and education ==
Owsley received his early education in New Orleans. He graduated from Metairie Park Country Day School in Metairie, Louisiana, in 1973. He attended Princeton University in Princeton, New Jersey, where he graduated with a B.S.E. degree in civil engineering, summa cum laude, in 1977. His additional academic honors included election to and membership in Phi Beta Kappa, Tau Beta Pi and Sigma Xi. He was also awarded the James Hayes-Edgar Palmer Prize in Engineering and Applied Science. His activities at Princeton included his service as chairman of photography at The Daily Princetonian. He is a member of Tiger Inn, the third-oldest eating club at Princeton University. He subsequently attended MIT Sloan School of Management and graduated with an S.M. degree in 1979.

== Career ==
Owsley joined Goldman Sachs in 1979 and worked in the Corporate Finance and Mergers & Acquisitions departments. He founded Goldman Sachs' workout group and was co-founder of its technology group. After leaving Goldman Sachs, he founded Gordian Group, LLC in 1988, a boutique investment bank in New York specializing in solving complex problems in bankruptcy and restructuring. Owsley is the Chief Executive Officer of Gordian Group. In 2007, Henry Owsley, Peter S. Kaufman, and Sam Bronfman co-founded Bacchus Capital Management, a private equity fund that invests in wineries.

Owsley is a frequent commentator in the media on distressed investment banking, conflicts of interest, and the economy. Owsley has been interviewed and quoted by general and business media outlets including ABC News, Bloomberg Businessweek, trade press Investment Dealers' Digest, Fox Business, The New York Times, Reuters, The Bankruptcy Strategist and TheStreet.com.

In 2015, Owsley and his partner Peter S. Kaufman updated the volume that they co-wrote in 2005, Distressed Investment Banking: To The Abyss and Back, publishing with Beard Books both times. The book was received favorably, with Barry Ridings of Lazard writing, "Distressed Investment Banking is a book every distressed market professional will want in their bookcase." In 2014, Owsley and Kaufman wrote Equity Holders Under Siege: Strategies and Tactics for Distressed Businesses, again with Beard Books, intended for all boards of directors, management teams and shareholders and owners of financially stressed situations, with advice for buyers and professionals as well.

Owsley is consistently ranked in the top ten investment banker rankings, including number four ranking in The Deal Bankruptcy League Tables for 2012. His firm, Gordian Group, has been honored with industry awards including being named one of the Outstanding Investment Banking Firms of 2014 by Turnarounds & Workouts. In January 2014, the industry organization M&A Advisor announced that Gordian won their "Boutique Investment Bank of the Year" award for the third time. It formally applauded Gordian for their restructurings of Jobson Medical Holdings (Professional Services category) and Elyria Foundry (Industrial, Manufacturing & Distribution category). He advised the Transport Workers Union of America in the American Airlines bankruptcy and the Bakery, Confectionery, Tobacco Workers and Grain Millers' International Union in connection with the Hostess Brands bankruptcy.

== Publications ==
- Co-author, Equity Holders under Siege: Strategies and Tactics for Distressed Businesses.(Frederick, Md.: Beard Books LLC, 2014)
- Co-author, Distressed Investment Banking: To the Abyss and Back.(Frederick, Md.: Beard Books LLC, 2005)
- Co-author, "The Role of the Investment Banker," in Bankruptcy Business Acquisitions (New York: Lex Med Publishing, 1998)
- Co-author, "Trading in the Distressed Market," in Investing in Bankruptcies and Turnarounds (New York: HarperCollins Publishers, 1991)
