= Peter S. Kaufman =

American investment banker and private equity investor

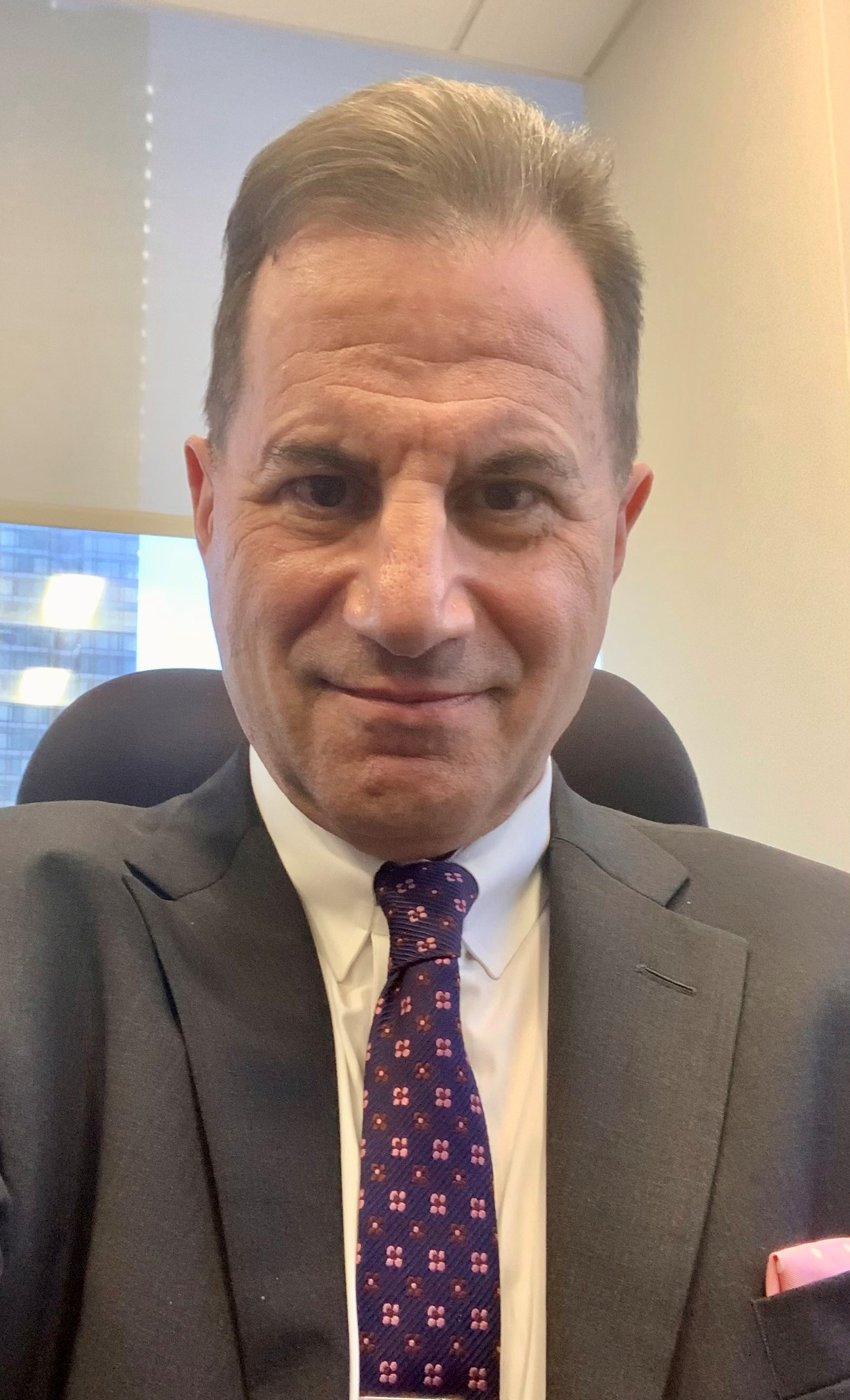
- Education: University of Virginia Law School; Yale University
- Occupations: Investment banker; investor president; Managing Partner at Gordian Group; General Partner of Bacchus Capital Capital Management

Peter S. Kaufman is an American investment banker and private equity investor. He is the Managing Partner at Gordian Group LLC, an investment banking firm. He is also a General Partner of Bacchus Capital Management, a winery investment concern.

== Early life and education ==
Kaufman attended the Edgemont Junior High School in Westchester County, New York, and graduated from The Taft School, cum laude. He attended Yale University, where he lettered in varsity lacrosse, was an editor of the Yale Daily News, and had a double major in art history and history, graduating with Honors. He was in the top quarter of his class at The University of Virginia School of Law.

== Career ==
Kaufman practiced law in New York City before going into investment banking. He joined Gordian Group LLC, as an investment banker specializing in distressed and/or complex financial challenges. Along with CEO Henry Furlow Owsley III, Kaufman is co-author of major works in the field, Distressed Investment Banking: To The Abyss and Back - Second Edition, Beard Books 2015, Equity Holders Under Siege: Strategies and Tactics for Distressed Businesses, Beard Books LLC, 2014 and Distressed Investment Banking: To The Abyss and Back, Beard Books 2005. He has been an Adjunct Professor at University of Virginia Law for the past ten years, teaching "Advising Boards of Directors Under Siege".

He was formerly an award-winning contributor to SportsIllustrated.com/Morning Read on golf. Kaufman had an article selected by Sports Illustrated as one of the ‘best golf reads’ in each of 2021 and 2022. He is a member of the Metropolitan Golf Writers Association. He currently is a columnist for The Daily Drive.

He is frequently cited in the media as an expert in restructurings, distressed financial matters, and economic policy issues. He has appeared regularly on national television to provide commentary on these topics. The phrase "Nastiest Man in Restructuring" has been used by some financial creditors in reference to his approach to restructuring. Additionally, he has been recognized in the media as a leading expert in restructuring and distressed debt. Kaufman has appeared on, among others, Yahoo! Finance discussing the future and whether more companies will file for Chapter 11, Healthcare Bailouts and Hertz Trying to Sell Equity, the COVID-19 government bailout, Bloomberg TV, CNBC, CNN (including Anderson Cooper 360), Fox Business with Maria Bartiromo, Fox Business, NBC (Today Show) and WSJ TV, on matters relating to insolvency, corporate reorganization, federal "bailout" issues and broader stimulus and economic issues, including General Motors (GM), Chrysler and British Petroleum (BP), American Airlines & Hostess Brands, as well as municipal and state insolvency issues. He provides commentary on private equity in various media outlets, including television. He has been cited by leading publications and international news sources such as The New York Times, The Wall Street Journal, and Reuters.

Kaufman's investment banking practice primarily encompasses advising Boards of Directors, private equity firms, and buyers and sellers of distressed, stressed or "story" situations. Because it does not represent creditors, Gordian is able to achieve meaningful equity recoveries in insolvent situations. In 2013, he testified in front of the ABI Commission on Bankruptcy Reform in regards to valuation. At Bacchus Capital, he is actively involved in the fund's selection and oversight of portfolio company wineries.

== Professional recognition ==
External videos
- You can see video interviews of Peter S. Kaufman on Fox Business News here: .

The industry organization, M&A Advisor awarded Gordian Group LLC as Boutique Investment Bank of the Year award for the ninth time in fourteen years. Gordian Group was named a winner for the Out-Of-Court Restructuring of the Year (Over $100MM): Restructuring and Sale of Trans Energy, Inc.; and Cross-Border Restructuring Deal of the Year (Under $1B): Cross-Border Restructuring of Alphatec. It also awarded Gordian on behalf of their restructurings of Jobson Medical Holdings (Professional Services category) and Elyria Foundry (Industrial, Manufacturing & Distribution category). In 2014, the University of Virginia awarded him an honorary appointment as a Visiting Executive Lecturer at the Darden Graduate School of Business Administration.

Kaufman was honored with the 2015 M&A Advisor Leadership Award for his contribution to and accomplishments in the industry at the 9th Annual Turnaround Awards Gala in Palm Beach, FL. Later that year, Kaufman was inducted into the M&A Advisor Hall of Fame at the 14th Annual M&A Advisor Awards Gala in New York City.

== Publications ==
- Co-author, "Warnings Persist for Corporate Directors Evaluating LBO and Other Multi-Step Transactions" (Harvard Law School Forum on Corporate Governance, July 21, 2021)
- Co-author, Distressed Investment Banking: To the Abyss and Back - Second Edition(Frederick, Md.: Beard Books, 2015)
- Co-author, Equity Holders under Siege: Strategies and Tactics for Distressed Businesses.(Frederick, Md.: Beard Books, 2014)
- Co-author, Distressed Investment Banking: To the Abyss and Back.(Frederick, Md.: Beard Books LLC, 2005)
- Co-author, "The Role of the Investment Banker," in Bankruptcy Business Acquisitions (New York: Lex Med Publishing, 1998)
- Co-author, "Trading in the Distressed Market," in Investing in Bankruptcies and Turnarounds (New York: HarperCollins Publishers, 1991)

== See also ==
- University of Virginia School of Law
- Yale University
- Taft School
