= American Board of Ophthalmology =

US medical certification organization

The American Board of Ophthalmology (ABO) is an independent, non-profit organization responsible for certifying ophthalmologists (eye physicians and surgeons) in the United States of America. Founded in 1916, the ABO was the first American Board established to certify medical specialists.

The ABO is the founding member of the American Board of Medical Specialties. Originally, a combined board of Ophthalmology & Otolaryngology, the specialties split into two board backed specialties in the 1960s.

Certification by the American Board of Ophthalmology is a voluntary process that involves a written and an oral examination. A candidate who passes both the written qualifying and oral examinations becomes a Board Certified Diplomate of the American Board of Ophthalmology.

== See also ==
- American Board of Medical Specialties
- American Osteopathic Board of Ophthalmology and Otolaryngology
