= American Osteopathic Board of Ophthalmology and Otolaryngology =

American Osteopathic Boards of Ophthalmology and Otolaryngology
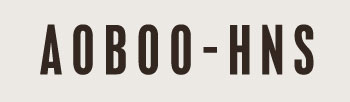
- Abbreviation: AOBOO
- Formation: 1940
- Type: Professional
- Headquarters: Chicago, IL
- Coordinates: 39.8408°N 84.1379°W
- Chairman: Douglas Miller, DO
- Vice Chairman: Kristin Reidy, DO
- Secretary: Tracey Childers, DO
- Website: aoboo.org

The American Osteopathic Boards of Ophthalmology and Otolaryngology - Head and Neck Surgery (AOBOO) is a joint organization that provides board certification to qualified Doctors of Osteopathic Medicine (D.O.) who specialize in the medical and surgical treatment of the eye (ophthalmologists) and to qualified Doctors of Osteopathic Medicine who specialize in the medical and surgical treatment of the ears, nose, and throat (otolaryngologists). The boards belong to the 18 medical specialty certifying boards approved by the American Osteopathic Association Bureau of Osteopathic Specialists of the American Osteopathic Association. As of December 2011, 736 osteopathic ophthalmologists and otolaryngologists held active certification with the AOBOO.

== Board certification ==
Initial board certification is available to eligible osteopathic ophthalmologists and otolaryngologists who have completed an American Osteopathic Association-approved residency in ophthalmology, otolaryngology, or otolaryngology/facial plastic surgery, two years of practice, and successful completion of written and oral exams. Board certified osteopathic ophthalmologists and otolaryngologists must renew their certification every ten years to avoid expiration of their board certification status. The American Osteopathic Boards of Ophthalmology and Otolaryngology offer voluntary recertification and upon passage of the required examinations grant board-certified status for a period of ten years.

Board certification through the AOBOO is required of all ophthalmology and otolaryngology residency program directors.

Osteopathic ophthalmologists and otolaryngologists may also receive Certification of Added Qualifications (CAQ) in Otolaryngic allergy and in sleep medicine. Eligibility for a CAQ in sleep medicine requires a one-year fellowship, or documentation of equivalent clinical experience and training. The Certification of Added Qualifications must be maintained through the process of recertification every 10 years and requires candidates to pass both oral and written examinations.

== See also ==
- American Board of Ophthalmology
- American Board of Otolaryngology
