= Triological Society =

American professional medical association

The Triological Society, also known as the American Laryngological, Rhinological and Otological Society, is "the oldest society focused on academic and clinical otolaryngology and is the only society that is not specific to an otolaryngology subspecialty".

== History ==
The Triological Society was founded in the United States in 1895. Edward B. Dench was the society's first president. Presidents of the society serve one-year terms. The society elected its first female president, Gaelyn Garrett, in 2019. In 1921, Rose Hall Skillern observed that the Triological Society duplicated the work of the Academy of Otolaryngology, and suggested that the two might more efficiently be merged.

== Membership ==
Membership in the Triological Society is by election, and candidates must submit a research thesis for consideration. In 1995, only about 10% of specialists in the fields of otorhinolaryngology were members of the society. Notable members include:

- LaVonne Bergstrom
- Doug Girod
- Mary Despina Lekas
- Robert H. Miller (surgeon)
- Eugene Nicholas Myers

== Publications and other activities ==
The society publishes a monthly newsletter, ENT Today, and two peer-reviewed professional journals, The Laryngoscope and Laryngoscope Investigative Otolaryngology; the latter is open-access and online only. The society also makes about $500,000 in grants to its members, for research and travel, holds conferences, and presents annual awards for achievement in the field.
