= Hapalonychia =

- Other names: Egg-shell nail
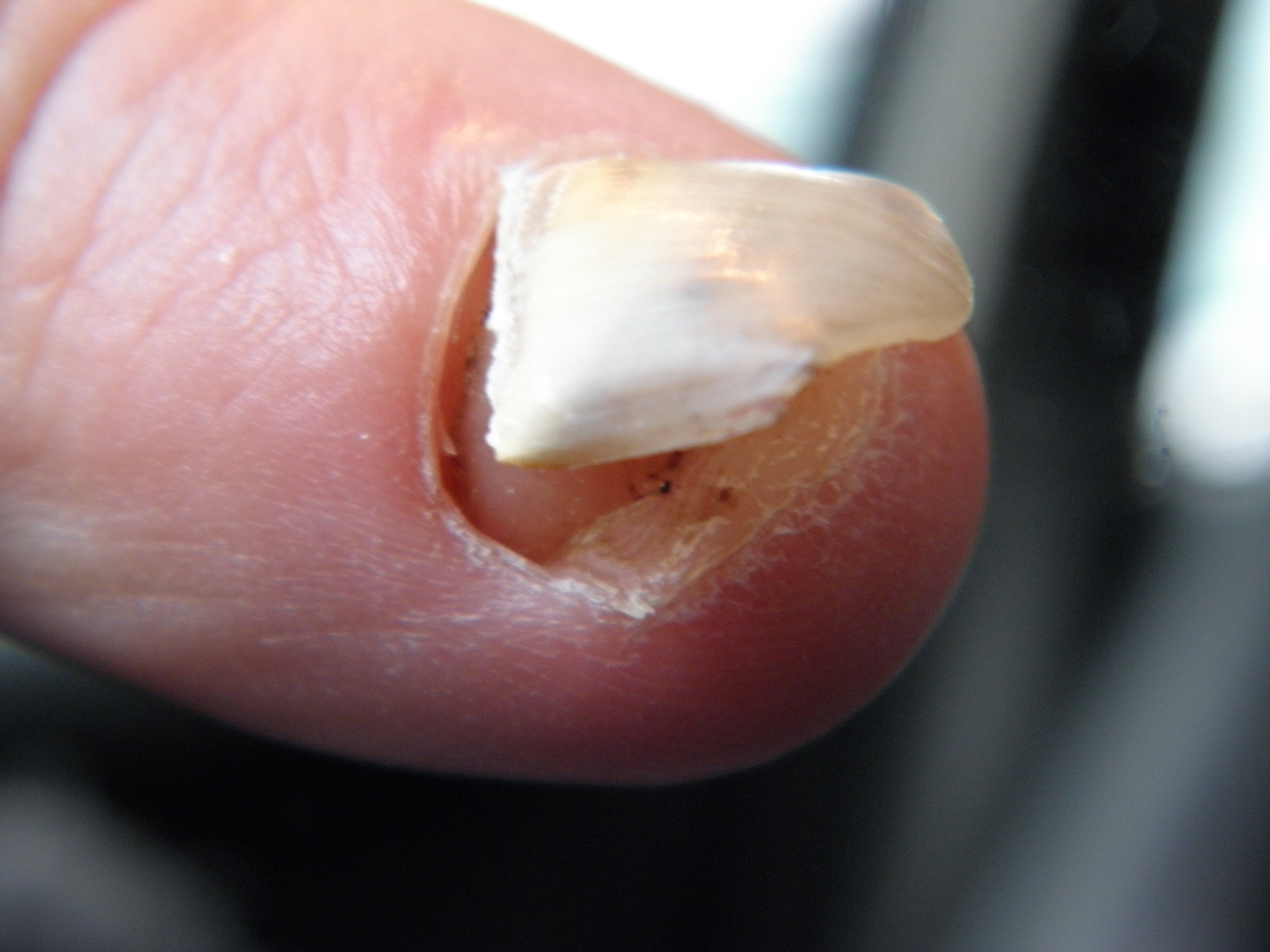
- Detached nail (in this image, due to crushing injury).
- Specialty: Dermatology

Hapalonychia, is a condition in which a toenail or fingernail (or multiple nails) nail becomes soft and thin, causing it to easily bend or break. This can result from an inherited condition, malnutrition, or debility.

Nails often reflect underlying systemic health and nutrition issues. Although overall well-being is not typically determined by nail health, fissures, nail fissures (or breaks) and calcium spots are minor indications of inner health. Hapalonychia is known to occur in persons with myxedema, rheumatoid arthritis, anorexia, bulimia, Hansen's disease, Raynaud phenomenon, oral retinoid therapy, and radiodermatitis.

Treatment involves treating the underlying cause and filling down the nail to reduce symptoms.

== Signs and symptoms ==
Hapalonychia is marked by a thin, pliable nail plate that is prone to splitting or cracking at the ends. In certain instances, the nails could have a bluish-white colour and be semitransparent.

== Causes ==
Hapalonychia may result from a vitamin and mineral deficit or may be congenital. More precisely, deficiencies in calcium and vitamins A, B6, C, and D have been linked to hapalonychia. In addition, hapalonychia may be a clinical manifestation of several disorders that cause hyperhidrosis. Hapalonychia can occur in conjunction with several illnesses, including cachexia, wet gangrene, kwashiorkor, leprosy, paronychia, scleroderma, and myxedema.

== Treatment ==
If there is a deficiency, vitamin or mineral supplements should be taken to restore sufficient stores as part of the hapalonychia treatment plan. If not, hapalonychia can be controlled by appropriately filing down the nails to lessen the symptoms.

== See also ==
- Nail anatomy
