= Peter M. Wolf =

American author and businessman

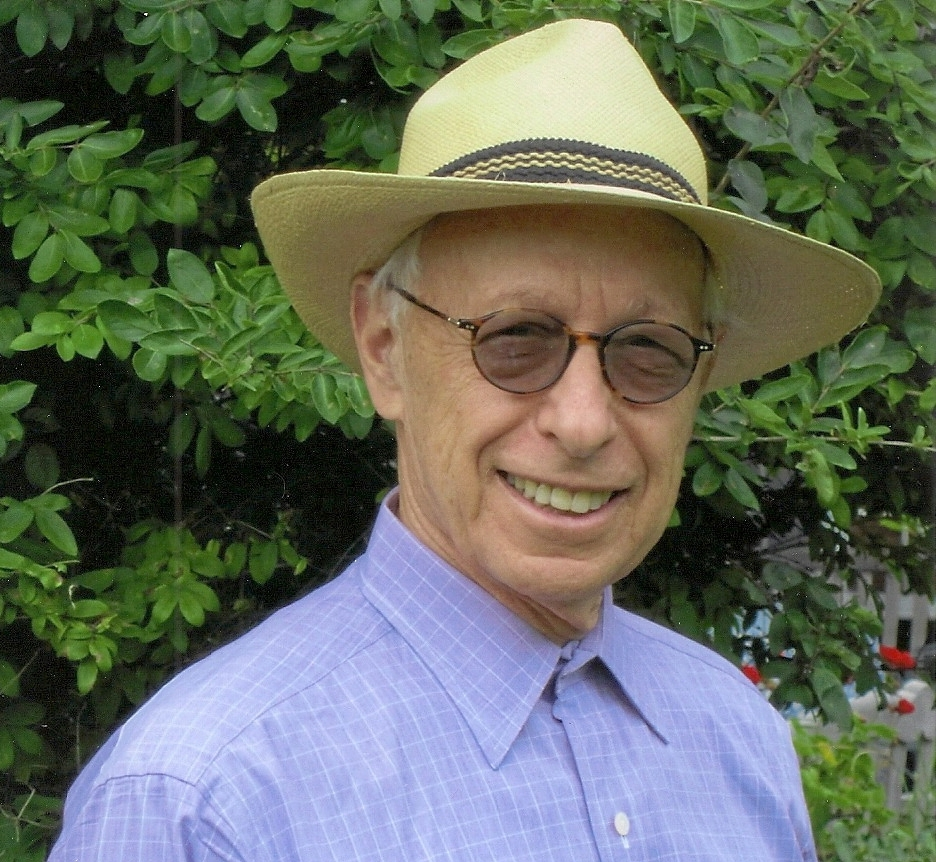
- Born: New Orleans, Louisiana
- Occupations: Author, educator, asset manager, land use authority
- Awards: Ford Foundation, National Endowment for the Arts, Graham Foundation

Peter M. Wolf is an American author, land planning and urban policy authority, investment manager, and philanthropist. He lives in New Orleans, Louisiana.

== Early biography ==
Peter Michael Wolf was born in New Orleans. He is the author of several books, including the biography The Sugar King: Leon Godchaux, A New Orleans Legend, His Creole Slave, and His Jewish Roots and his memoir, My New Orleans, Gone Away – A Memoir of Loss and Renewal. Wolf attended Metairie Park Country Day School, Phillips Exeter Academy, Yale University (BA), Tulane University (MA), and New York University Institute of Fine Arts (PhD). At Yale, he was elected to the Manuscript Society and the Elizabethan Club, and was a board member and the publicity manager of the Yale Daily News. During his graduate studies, he was awarded a Fulbright Fellowship in Paris. His doctoral dissertation was published in 1968, Eugène Hénard and the Beginning of Urbanism in Paris 1900–1914. In 1969, it became the basis for a solo exhibition at the Museum of Modern Art in New York.

Wolf has been awarded grants for his writing and scholarship by the Ford Foundation, the National Endowment for the Arts, the Graham Foundation for Advanced Studies in the Fine Arts, and the National Research and Education Trust Fund. He has twice been a visiting artist/scholar at the American Academy in Rome.

Wolf's career in urbanism began at Wilbur Smith Associates, where he engaged in land planning focused on transportation. He began teaching urbanism as an adjunct professor at the School of Architecture at the Cooper Union for the Advancement of Science and Art in 1971, and continued in that role through 1987. Wolf also began working for the Institute for Architecture and Urban Studies in 1971, participating in a number of research initiatives, including: "The Street as a Component of the Urban Environment" (co-director with architect Peter Eisenman, 1971–1973); "Low-Rise High-Density Prototype" (co-director with professor Kenneth Frampton, 1971–1973); and Union Square Redevelopment Program (director, 1972–1973). From 1972–1982 Wolf was chairman of the IAUS Board of Fellows and as a trustee.

Between 1965 and 1990, Wolf published studies and articles related to land use and open space planning for the Office of the Manhattan Borough President, the Department of Housing and Urban Development, Pan American World Airways, and private land owners across the US. His study, "Shaker Heritage Historic District," commissioned by the National Endowment for the Arts, the New York State Council on the Arts, the Shaker Central Trust Fund, and the Historical Society of the Town of Colonie, New York, was instrumental in saving the first Shaker settlement in America, a National Register of Historic Places property. In 1987, as the consultant to the Village of East Hampton, New York, he rewrote the East Hampton Village Residential Zoning Ordinance and, in 2002, he was senior advisor to the Town of East Hampton Comprehensive Plan.

== Recent biography ==
In 2010, Wolf founded and became chairman of the Thomas Moran Trust, a nonprofit organization aiming to restore the Thomas Moran House, the studio house and gardens of painter Thomas Moran and printmaker Mary Nimmo Moran, a National Historic Property.

Wolf's memoir, My New Orleans, Gone Away, was published by Delphinium Books in 2013. The book, which reached the New York Times e-book best seller list in 2016, celebrates New Orleans and explores growing up as a Jew in the South.

== Public service ==
Wolf has served on the New York Cultural Council, the Executive Committee of the Architectural League of New York, and the Advisory Board of the National Academy of Design. He was chairman of the Van Alen Institute in New York, New York and a trustee of One to World, a program for Fulbright Fellows and other foreign students in the greater New York area. He was appointed to the New York State Advisory Board of The Trust for Public Land. He is currently an Advisory Board member of the Tulane University School of Architecture, a trustee of Guild Hall and the Village Preservation Society, both in East Hampton where he was a Town-appointed member of the Airport Planning Committee, Noise Subcommittee.

== Bibliography ==
=== Books ===
- Eugène Hénard and the Beginning of Urbanism in France 1900–1914 (International Federation of Housing and Planning/Centre de Recherché de Urbanisme, 1969)
- Another Chance for Cities (Whitney Museum of American Art, 1970)
- The Evolving City: Urban Design Proposals by Ulrich Franzen and Paul Rudolph (Whitney Library of Design for American Federation of Arts, 1974)
- The Future of the City: New Directions in Urban Planning (Watson Guptill Publications, 1974)
- Land in America: Its Value, Use and Control (Pantheon Books, 1981)
- Hot Towns: The Future of the Fastest Growing Communities in America (Rutgers University Press, 1999)
- Land Use and Abuse in America: A Call to Action (Xlibris Corporation, 2010)
- My New Orleans, Gone Away – A Memoir of Loss and Renewal (Delphinium Books, 2013)
- The Sugar King: Leon Godchaux, A New Orleans Legend, His Creole Slave, and His Jewish Roots (Bayou Editions/Xlibris Books, 2022). ISBN 978-1-6698-2931-7
- The Etruscans and the Jews: New Orleans Echoes, Sardinian Shadows, Roman Shame (Bayou Editions/Xlibris Books, 2025). ISBN 979-8-3694-3429-1

== Exhibitions ==
- Eugène Hénard and Urban Anticipations, Museum of Modern Art, New York (1969)
- Another Chance for Cities, Whitney Museum of American Art, New York (1970)
- Another Chance for Housing, Low-Rise Alternatives, Museum of Modern Art, New York (1973)
- Recapturing Wisdom's Valley: The Watervliet Shaker Heritage, 1775–1975, Albany Institute of History & Art, Albany, New York (1975)

== Sources ==
- 1957 Class Book, Yale Banner Publications
- Julius Weis, Autobiography of Julius Weis, Goldman's Printing Office, New Orleans, Louisiana, 1908
- Paul L. Godchaux, Jr., The Godchaux Family of New Orleans, self-published, 1971
- Laura Renee Westbrook, "The Godchaux Family in Louisiana History, Literature, and Public Folklore," PhD dissertation, University of Louisiana/Lafayette, 2001
- Course 185: The Development of Cities, Cooper Union School of Architecture, Cooper Union Course Catalog 1977–1987
- "IAUS: The Institute for Architecture and Urban Studies,” published by the Institute for Architecture and Urban Studies, 1979
- "Feasibility Study, Durham Golf Development" for Paul Kempner and Associates, 1969
- "Land Investment Management Study for Sugarland Industries, Inc.," Houston, Texas, 1970
- "Toward an Evaluation Framework for Transportation Planning in the Urban Context" for United States Department of Housing and Urban Development (HUD), Washington, DC, June 1971
- "The Impact of Metro-Flight on Urban Centers and Regional Development in the North-East Corridor" for Pan American World Airways, Inc., 1971
- "Lower Midtown Manhattan Study" for President, Borough of Manhattan and Community Board 5, New York, 1972
- "Shaker Heritage Historic District: South Family Property, Design and Implementation Program," 1973
- "Land Management Study, Watervliet-Shaker Historic and Recreation District" for the Town of Colonie, New York, 1973
- "Historic and Commercial Land Management Report" for East Hampton Town Planning Board, June 1976
- "East Hampton Village Zoning Study: A Report to The Trustees of East Hampton Village" April 1987
- Draft Generic Environmental Impact Statement & Village of East Hampton Comprehensive Plan, adopted February 15, 2002
- Robin Pogrebin, "Preserving the Home of Thomas Moran, Whose Art Preserves Visions of the West," The New York Times, August 24, 2006
- Aileen Jacobson, "New Life for a Renowned Painter's House," The New York Times, March 215, 2009
- Jeremy D. Samuelson, "The Lay of the Land," The East Hampton Star, April 27, 2011
- Yardley, Jonathan (July 7, 2013). "Rising above Bias in the Big Easy". The Washington Post. Archived from the original on June 1, 2016 – via HighBeam Research.
- Winston Groom, "The Place He Was Once From," Wall Street Journal, July 19, 2013
- Lori Ferguson, "Profile: Peter Wolf '53," The Exeter Bulletin, Winter 2014
- Michael Patrick Welch, "Vanished Culture," The New Orleans Advocate, January 11, 2014
- Joanne Pilgrim, "Aircraft Noise Sets Off a Primal Scream," The East Hampton Star, September 4, 2014
- Joanne Pilgrim, "Big Players in New Push to Rein in Airport," The East Hampton Star, November 24, 2014
- Joanne Pilgrim, "Packed Hearing on Airport Noise," The East Hampton Star, March 19, 2015
- James Barron, "As Din of Aircraft Grows, East Hampton Reclaims Power to Regulate Airport," The New York Times, January 4, 2015
