= Epley maneuver =

Maneuver used by medical professionals to treat one common cause of vertigo

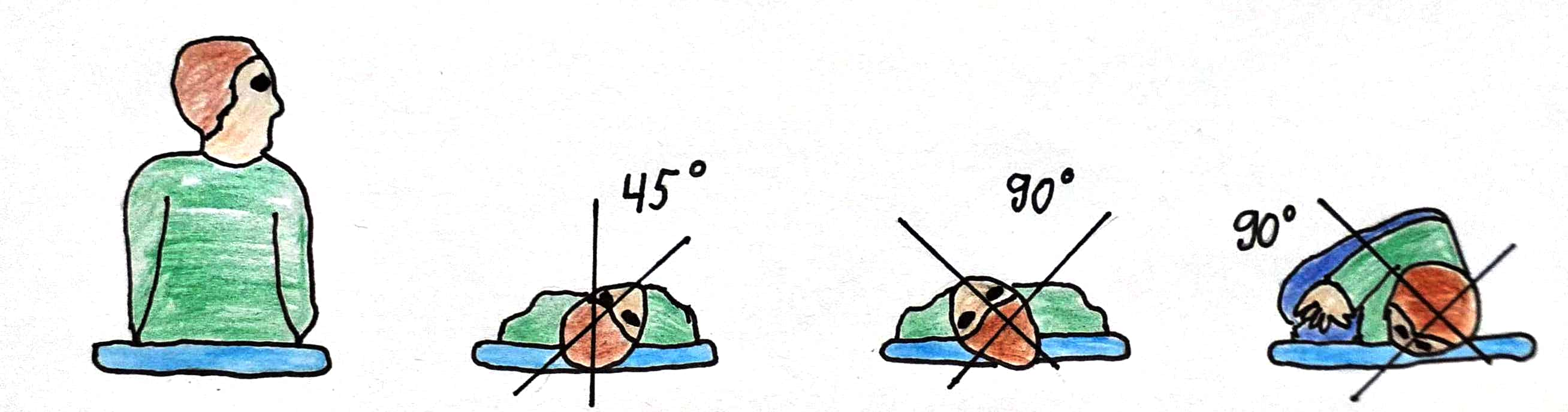
Epley maneuver

The Epley maneuver or repositioning maneuver is a maneuver used by medical professionals to treat one common cause of vertigo, benign paroxysmal positional vertigo (BPPV) of the posterior or anterior canals of the ear. The maneuver works by allowing free-floating particles, namely displaced otoconia (calcium carbonate structures), from the affected semicircular canal to be relocated by using gravity, back into the utricle, where they can no longer stimulate the cupula, therefore relieving the patient of bothersome vertigo. The maneuver was developed by the physician John M. Epley, and was first described in 1980.

A version of the maneuver called the "modified" Epley does not include vibrations of the mastoid process originally indicated by Epley, as the vibration procedures have been proven ineffective. The modified procedure is now the one generally accepted as the Epley maneuver.

== Effectiveness ==
An Epley maneuver is a safe and effective treatment for BPPV, although the condition recurs in approximately one third of cases.

== Sequence of positions ==
The following sequence of positions describes the Epley maneuver:

1. The patient begins in an upright sitting posture, with the legs fully extended and the head rotated 45 degrees toward the side in the same direction that gives a positive Dix–Hallpike test.
2. Then the patient is quickly lowered into a supine position (on the back), with the head held approximately in a 30-degree neck extension (Dix-Hallpike position), with the head remaining rotated to the side.
3. The clinician observes the patient's eyes for "primary stage" nystagmus.
4. The patient remains in this position for approximately 1–2 minutes.
5. Then the patient's head is rotated 90 degrees in the opposite direction, so that the opposite ear faces the floor, while maintaining 30 degrees of neck extension.
6. The patient remains in this position for approximately 1–2 minutes.
7. Keeping the head and neck in a fixed position relative to the body, the patient rolls onto the shoulder, thus rotating the head another 90 degrees in the direction being faced. Now the patient is looking downward at a 45-degree angle.
8. The eyes should be observed immediately by the clinician for "secondary stage" nystagmus (this secondary stage nystagmus should be in the same direction as the primary stage nystagmus).
9. The patient remains in this position for approximately 1–2 minutes.
10. Finally, the patient is slowly brought up to an upright sitting posture, while maintaining the 45-degree rotation of the head.
11. The patient holds a sitting position for up to 30 seconds.

These steps may be repeated twice, for a total of three times during a procedure. During every step of this procedure, the patient may experience some dizziness.

== Post-treatment phase ==
Following the treatment, the clinician may provide the patient with a soft collar, often worn for the remainder of the day, as a cue to avoid any head positions that may once again displace the otoconia. The patient may be instructed to be cautious of bending over, lying backward, moving the head up and down, or tilting the head to either side. For the next two nights, patients should sleep in a semi-recumbent position. This means sleeping with the head halfway between being flat and being upright (at a 45-degree angle). This is most easily done by using a recliner chair or by using pillows arranged on a couch. The soft collar is removed occasionally. When doing so, the patient should be encouraged to perform horizontal movements of the head to maintain normal neck range of motion. It is important to instruct the patient that horizontal movement of the head should be performed to prevent stiff neck muscles.

It remains uncertain whether activity restrictions following the treatment improve the effectiveness of the canalith repositioning maneuver. However, study patients who were not provided with any activity restrictions, needed one or two additional treatment sessions to attain a successful outcome. The Epley maneuver appears to be a long-term, effective, and conservative treatment for BPPV that has a limited number of complications (nausea, vomiting, and residual vertigo) and is well tolerated by patients.

== Background information ==
In 1957, John M. Epley received his M.D. degree from the University of Oregon Medical School (now Oregon Health Sciences University). While a resident at Stanford Medical School he conducted original research on the first multichannel cochlear implant. He developed his BPPV technique in 1979. He died July 31, 2019.

The goal of an Epley maneuver is to restore the equilibrium of the vestibular system, more specifically, to the semicircular canals, in order to treat the symptoms associated with BPPV. There is compelling evidence that free-floating otoconia, probably displaced from the otolithic membrane in the utricle, are the main cause of this disequilibrium. Recent pathological findings also suggest that the displaced otoconia typically settle in the posterior semicircular canal in the cupula of the ampulla and render it sensitive to gravity. The cupula move in relation to acceleration of the head during rotary movements and signal to the brain via action potentials about which way the head is moving in relation to its surroundings. However, once a crystal becomes lodged in the cupula, it only takes slight head movements in combination with gravity, to create an action potential, which signals to the brain that the head is moving through space, when in reality, it is not, thus creating the experience of vertigo associated with BPPV.

When a therapist is performing an Epley maneuver, the patient's head is rotated to 45 degrees in the direction of the affected side, in order to target the posterior semicircular canal of the affected side. When the patient is passively positioned from an upright seated posture down to a supine (lying on the back) position, this momentum helps to dislodge the otoconia (crystal) embedded in the cupula. Steps 3–10 in the above-mentioned procedure are intended to cause the newly dislodged crystal to be brought back to the utricle through the posterior semicircular canal so that it can be re-absorbed by the utricle.

== See also ==
- Balance disorder
- DizzyFIX
