= American Bronchoesophagological Association =

US health organization

The American Broncho-Esophagological Association (ABEA) was founded in 1917 by Chevalier Jackson, the well-known American otolaryngologist. The ABEA is a society of physicians who share their expertise and meet annually for scholarly presentations on matters relevant to the science and practice of their specialty. The association deals with the medical and surgical diseases of the upper aerodigestive tract, including the larynx, the pharynx, the tracheobronchial tree and the esophagus.

The ABEA convenes each spring for a scientific meeting in which original research is presented to an international audience, in conjunction with other otolaryngology subspecialty societies under the auspices of COSM (Combined Otolaryngology Spring Meeting). In addition, the ABEA has endowments for several named lectures given at the annual meeting by noteworthy speakers in bronchoesophagology and allied fields. Continuing medical education courses have also been sponsored by the association. The ABEA is active in the generation of practice guidelines, and in ongoing national efforts related to coding and reimbursement.
