= Clinics in Dermatology =

- Subject: Dermatology
- Language: English
- Edited by: L.C. Parish

Publication details
- History: 1983-present
- Publisher: Elsevier (United States)
- Frequency: Bimonthly
- Impact factor: 2.470 (2014)

Standard abbreviations
- ISO 4: Clin. Dermatol.

Indexing
- ISSN: 0738-081X (print); 1879-1131 (web)
- LCCN: 92659577
- OCLC no.: 09508305

Links
- Journal homepage; International Academy of Cosmetic Dermatology

Clinics in Dermatology is a medical journal published for the International Academy of Cosmetic Dermatology by Elsevier, addressing clinical treatment and care of skin disorders. According to the Journal Citation Reports, the journal has a 2014 impact factor of 2.470.
