= Otolaryngology–Head and Neck Surgery =

- Discipline: Otolaryngology
- Language: English
- Edited by: Cecelia Schmalbach

Publication details
- History: 1995-present
- Publisher: SAGE Publishing on behalf of the American Academy of Otolaryngology–Head and Neck Surgery
- Frequency: Monthly
- Impact factor: 5.591 (2021)

Standard abbreviations
- ISO 4: Otolaryngol. Head Neck Surg.

Indexing
- CODEN: OHNSDL
- ISSN: 0194-5998 (print); 1097-6817 (web)
- OCLC no.: 638742774

Links
- Journal homepage; Online access; Online archive

Otolaryngology–Head and Neck Surgery is a monthly peer-reviewed medical journal that covers the field of otolaryngology, especially surgery of the head and neck. The journal's editor-in-chief is Cecelia Schmalbach (Temple University). It was established in 1995 and is published by SAGE Publishing on behalf of the American Academy of Otolaryngology–Head and Neck Surgery.

== Abstracting and indexing ==
The journal is abstracted and indexed in Scopus and the Social Sciences Citation Index. According to the Journal Citation Reports, the journal has a 2021 impact factor of 5.591.
