= American Board of Otolaryngology =

The American Board of Otolaryngology logo

The American Board of Otolaryngology, located in Houston, Texas, is a non-profit corporation that has set the mission of ensuring professional standards with certificates and memberships, and have offered training in the fields of head neck surgery to professionals since 1924.

Five years of training in an Accreditation Council for Graduate Medical Education (ACGME) program, along with the successful completion of both a written and oral exam is required to achieve certification.

== Mission ==
The mission of the American Board of Otolaryngology - Head and Neck Surgery (ABOHNS) is to assure that, at the time of certification and recertification, diplomates certified by the ABOHNS have met the ABOHNS's professional standards of training and knowledge in otolaryngology - head and neck surgery.

The ABOHNS's fiduciary responsibility is to the public. Although the ABOHNS carefully considers the concerns of and impact on our diplomates, it is what is in the public's best interest that guides the ABOHNS's decision making process.

== Meaning of certification ==
While licensure by the individual states sets the minimum competency requirements to practice medicine, it is not specialty specific. Board certification is a voluntary program in which specialists seek to improve their performance and demonstrate a commitment to their profession. Board-certified otolaryngologists must meet the ABOto training requirements, pass psychometrically validated examinations, and participate in Maintenance of Certification.

The ABOto views certification as not just passing the examinations, but a continuum beginning with entry into training and ends with retirement. In order to be eligible to take the certification examinations, candidates must be registered with the ABOto Resident Registry by their Program Director at the beginning of their training, which includes verification of graduation from medical school. The Program Director provides the ABOto with an annual evaluation of each resident and determines whether the resident should receive credit for completion of that year of training. Applicants are required to have completed an ACGME-accredited residency and receive approval from their Program Director to sit for the examinations. The online application process must be completed by the appropriate deadlines, which allows time for the information to be verified.

== History ==
(adapted from the "American Board of Otolaryngology 1924–1999" by Robert W. Cantrell, MD and Jerome C. Goldstein, MD)

The first formal proposal for a standardized, prescribed post-graduate period of medical education was made at the 1912 meeting of the Triological Society and published in the Laryngoscope in 1913. The American Academy of Ophthalmology and Otolaryngology (the two academies formally separated in the late 1977) embraced this initiative by establishing two committees to explore this concept and develop a plan. The otolaryngology committee consisted of representatives from the Academy, the American Laryngological Association, the American Otological Society, the AMA Section on Otolaryngology, and the Triological Society. The committee established, not without controversy, a recommended curriculum of training that should last three years, if possible. The ABOto accredited otolaryngology residencies until 1953 when the Residency Review Committee of the Accreditation Council for Graduate Medical Education assumed this responsibility.

Under pressure from the Academy, the ABOto was constituted in 1924 to develop a certifying examination, the first of which was administered in 1926. The certifying examination has evolved over the years from its original oral examination and a written histopathology examination. For several years, actual patients with otolaryngological conditions were used in various sites around the country in the "practical exam". The current format of a multiple choice written and a structured oral examination was established in the 1970s, but has been significantly refined over the past thirty years.

== Staff ==
The board examinations are currently handled by Executive Director Elect Brian Nussenbaum, MD, FACS. Physicians who are not board certified by ABOTO, can misrepresent their board credentials and are not censured or punished by the board.

== See also ==
- American Osteopathic Board of Ophthalmology and Otolaryngology
- American Board of Medical Specialties
