= The Laryngoscope =

- Discipline: Otolaryngology
- Language: English
- Edited by: Samuel H. Selesnick

Publication details
- History: 1896; 129 years ago to present
- Publisher: Wiley-Blackwell on behalf of the Triological Society
- Frequency: Monthly
- Impact factor: 2.442 (2017)

Standard abbreviations
- ISO 4: Laryngoscope

Indexing
- ISSN: 0023-852X (print); 1531-4995 (web)
- OCLC no.: 01755551

Links
- Journal homepage; Online access; Online archive

The Laryngoscope is a monthly peer-reviewed medical journal in the field of otolaryngology. It was established in 1896 and is published by Wiley-Blackwell on behalf of the Triological Society. The editor-in-chief is Samuel H. Selesnick (Weill Cornell Medical College). According to the Journal Citation Reports, the journal has a 2017 impact factor of 2.442, ranking it 12th out of 41 journals in the category "Otorhinolaryngology".
