= Annals of Otology, Rhinology, and Laryngology =

- Discipline: Otorhinolaryngology
- Language: English
- Edited by: Richard J.H. Smith

Publication details
- Former name(s): Annals of Ophthalmology and Otology
- History: 1897–present
- Publisher: Annals Publishing Company (United States)
- Frequency: Monthly
- Impact factor: 1.171 (2016)

Standard abbreviations
- ISO 4: Ann. Otol. Rhinol. Laryngol.

Indexing
- CODEN: AORHA2
- ISSN: 0003-4894 (print); 1943-572X (web)
- OCLC no.: 01481398

Links
- Journal homepage; archive

The Annals of Otology, Rhinology, and Laryngology is a peer-reviewed monthly medical journal addressing topics in otolaryngology. It is the official journal of the American Broncho-Esophagological Association.

== History ==
The journal was established in 1892 by James Pleasant Parker (Kansas City Polyclinic Post-Graduate Medical School) as the Annals of Ophthalmology and Otology. It was published by his brother, Jones H. Parker (St. Louis, Missouri). On the editor's death his role was assumed by Casey A. Wood (Chicago) in 1896. The following year the journal was split into the quarterlies Annals of Ophthalmology and Annals of Otology, Rhinology, and Laryngology. In 1917 the journal absorbed the Index of Oto-laryngology (1897–1917).
