= Dix–Hallpike test =

Diagnostic maneuver used to identify benign paroxysmal positional vertigo

- ICD-9-CM: 95.45

The Dix–Hallpike or Nylén–Bárány test is a diagnostic maneuver from the group of rotation tests used to identify benign paroxysmal positional vertigo (BPPV).

== Procedure ==
When performing the Dix–Hallpike test, patients are lowered quickly to a supine position (lying horizontally with the face and torso facing up) with the neck extended 30 degrees below horizontal by the clinician performing the maneuver.

The Dix–Hallpike and the side-lying testing position have yielded similar results. As such, the side-lying position can be used if the Dix–Hallpike cannot be performed easily.

Steps:

1. perform first with the right ear down
2. perform next with the left ear down

The examiner looks for nystagmus (usually accompanied by vertigo). In BPPV, the nystagmus typically occurs in A or B only, and is torsional—the fast phase beating toward the lower ear. Its onset is usually delayed a few seconds, and it lasts 10–20 seconds. As the patient is returned to the upright position, transient nystagmus may occur in the opposite direction. Both nystagmus and vertigo typically decrease on repeat testing.

== Interpretation ==
=== Positive test result ===
A positive test is indicated by patient report of a reproduction of vertigo and clinician observation of nystagmus (involuntary eye movement).

For some patients, this maneuver may be contraindicated, and a modification may be needed that also targets the posterior semicircular canal. Such patients include those who are too anxious about eliciting the uncomfortable symptoms of vertigo, and those who may not have the range of motion necessary to comfortably be in a supine position. The modification involves the patient moving from a seated position to side-lying without their head extending off the examination table, such as with Dix–Hallpike. The head is rotated 45 degrees away from the side being tested, and the eyes are examined for nystagmus.

=== Negative test ===
If the test is negative, it makes benign positional vertigo a less likely diagnosis and central nervous system involvement should be considered.

== Advantages ==
Although there are alternative methods to administering the test, Cohen proposes advantages to the classic maneuver. The test can be easily administered by a single examiner, which prevents the need for external aid. Due to the position of the subject and the examiner, nystagmus, if present, can be observed directly by the examiner.

== Limitations ==
The negative predictive value of this test is not 100%. Some patients with a history of BPPV will not have a positive test result. The estimated sensitivity is 79%, along with an estimated specificity of 75%.

The test may need to be performed more than once, as it is not always easy to demonstrate observable nystagmus that is typical of BPPV. Also, the test results can be affected by the speed with which the maneuver is conducted and the plane of the occiput.

There are several disadvantages proposed by Cohen for the classic maneuver. Patients may be too tense, for fear of producing vertigo symptoms, which can prevent the necessary brisk passive movements for the test. A subject must have adequate cervical spine range of motion to allow neck extension, as well as trunk and hip range of motion to lie supine. From the previous point, the use of this maneuver can be limited by musculoskeletal and obesity issues in a subject.

== Precautions and contraindications ==
In rare cases a patient may be unable or unwilling to participate in the Dix–Hallpike test due to physical limitations. In these circumstances the side-lying test or other alternative tests may be used.

Precautions

- The Dix–Hallpike maneuver places a degree of stress on the patient's lower back; therefore, a cautious approach must be taken with patients who are suffering from back pain.
- Severe respiratory or cardiac problems may not allow a patient to tolerate the maneuver. For example, a patient with orthopnoea may not be able to participate in the procedure, as the patient may have troubling breathing when lying down.

Absolute contraindications

1. Neck surgery
2. Severe rheumatoid arthritis
3. Atlantoaxial and occipitoatlantal instability
4. Aplasia of odontoid process
5. Cervical myelopathy
6. Cervical radiculopathy
7. Carotid sinus syncope
8. Vascular dissection syndromes

== See also ==
- Tilt table test
- Epley maneuver – used to treat BPPV
