= Granular myringitis =

Ear condition

- Other names: GM
- Specialty: Otorhinolaryngology

Granular myringitis is a long term condition in which there is inflammation of the tympanic membrane in the ear and formation of granulation tissue within the tympanic membrane. It is a type of otitis externa.

Without treatment it can lead to narrowing of the ear canal. A number of treatment options exist including putting vinegar in the ear, using antibiotic drops, and surgery.

== Signs and symptoms ==
Clinically, patients experience aural fullness, intra-meatal itching, and malodorous otorrhea all at the same time. Although granular myringitis does not typically result in a hearing loss, it can cause complications like inflammatory infiltration of the deep canal, canal atresia or stenosis, and post-inflammatory medial canal fibrosis. It may be possible to see focal, segmental, diffuse, or polypoid red granulation tissue on a thicker tympanic membrane during an otoscopic examination. Mucopurulent discharge and involvement of the external auditory canal wall may also be present.

== Causes ==
It's not clear what caused it. It is acknowledged that one of the initial phases of granulation development is the loss of squamous epithelium on the lateral surface of the tympanic membrane. Affected ears frequently contain gram-negative organisms, particularly Proteus mirabilis, Staphylococcus aureus, and Pseudomonas aeruginosa.

== Treatment ==
The literature mentions three primary treatment modalities: debridement of granulomatous tissue, cauterization of granulations, and topical antibiotic with steroid drops. But no single treatment has been shown to work in every situation.

== See also ==
- Otitis externa
- Bullous myringitis hemorrhagica
