= Ear pain =

Pain in the ear

- Other names: Earache, otalgia
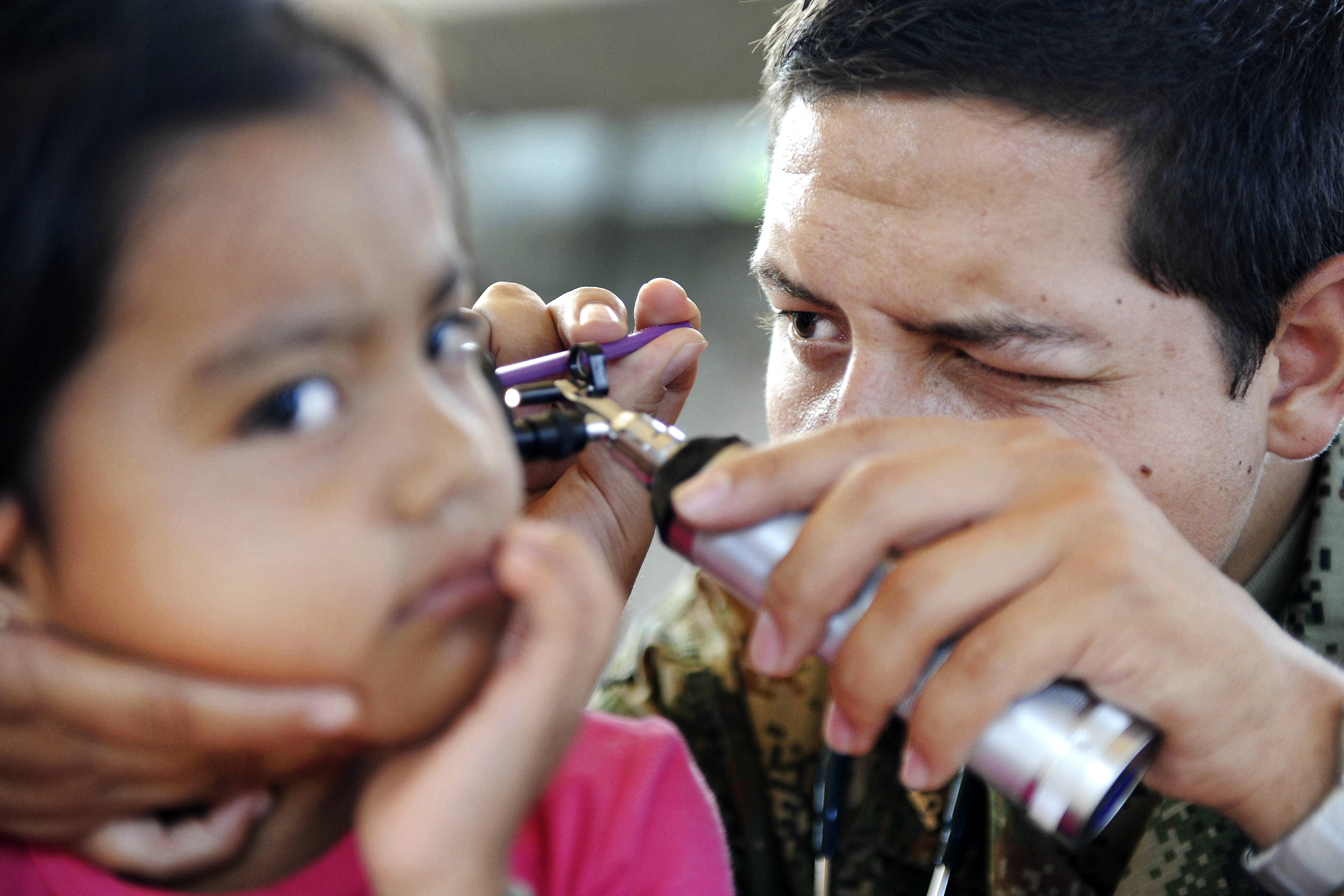
- Examination of the ear canal and eardrum
- Specialty: ENT surgery

Ear pain, also known as earache or otalgia, is pain in the ear. Primary ear pain is pain that originates from the ear. Secondary ear pain is a type of referred pain, meaning that the source of the pain differs from the location where the pain is felt.

Most causes of ear pain are non-life-threatening. Primary ear pain is more common than secondary ear pain, and it is often due to infection or injury. The conditions that cause secondary (referred) ear pain are broad and range from temporomandibular joint syndrome to inflammation of the throat.

In general, the reason for ear pain can be discovered by taking a thorough history of all symptoms and performing a physical examination, without need for imaging tools like a CT scan. However, further testing may be needed if red flags are present like hearing loss, dizziness, ringing in the ear or unexpected weight loss.

Management of ear pain depends on the cause. If there is a bacterial infection, antibiotics are sometimes recommended and over the counter pain medications can help control discomfort. Some causes of ear pain require a procedure or surgery.

83 percent of children have at least one episode of a middle ear infection by three years of age.

== Signs and symptoms ==
Ear pain can present in one or both ears. It may or may not be accompanied by other symptoms such as fever, sensation of the world spinning, ear itchiness, or a sense of fullness in the ear. The pain may or may not worsen with chewing. The pain may also be continuous or intermittent.

Ear pain due to an infection is the most common in children and can occur in babies. Adults may need further evaluation if they have hearing loss, dizziness or ringing in the ear. Additional red flags include diabetes, a weakened immune system, swelling seen on the outer ear, or swelling along the jaw.

== Causes ==
Ear pain has a variety of causes, the majority of which are not life-threatening. Ear pain can originate from a part of the ear itself, known as primary ear pain, or from an anatomic structure outside the ear that is perceived as pain within the ear, known as secondary ear pain. Secondary ear pain is a type of referred pain, meaning that the source of the pain differs from the location where the pain is felt. Primary ear pain is more common in children, whereas secondary (referred) pain is more common in adults.

Primary ear pain is most commonly caused by infection or injury to one of the parts of the ear.

=== External ear ===
Many conditions involving the external ear will be visible to the naked eye. Because the external ear is the most exposed portion of the ear, it is vulnerable to trauma or environmental exposures. Blunt trauma, such as a blow to the ear, can result in a hematoma, or collection of blood between the cartilage and perichondrium of the ear. This type of injury is particularly common in contact sports such as wrestling and boxing. Environmental injuries include sunburn, frostbite, or contact dermatitis.

Less common causes of external ear pain include:

- Auricular Cellulitis: a superficial infection of the ear that may be precipitated by trauma, an insect bite, or ear piercing
- Perichondritis: infection of the perichondrium, or fascia surrounding the ear cartilage, which can develop as a complication of untreated auricular cellulitis. It is important to identify and treat perichondritis with antibiotics to avoid permanent ear deformities.
- Relapsing polychondritis: a systemic inflammatory condition involving cartilage in many parts of the body, but often including the cartilage of both ears. The severity and prognosis of the disease varies widely.

==== Otitis externa ====
Otitis externa, also known as "swimmer's ear", is a cellulitis of the external ear canal. In North America, 98% of cases are caused by bacteria, and the most common causative organisms are Pseudomonas and Staph aureus. Risk factors include exposure to excessive moisture (e.g. from swimming or a warm climate) and disruption of the protective cerumen barrier, which can result from aggressive ear cleaning or placing objects in the ear.

Malignant otitis externa is a rare and potentially life-threatening complication of otitis externa in which the infection spreads from the ear canal into the surrounding skull base, hence becoming an osteomyelitis. It occurs largely in diabetic patients. It is very rare in children, though can be seen in immunocompromised children and adults. Pseudomonas is the most common causative organism. The pain tends to be more severe than in uncomplicated otitis externa, and laboratory studies often reveal elevated inflammatory markers (ESR and/or CRP). The infection may extend to cranial nerves, or rarely to the meninges or brain. Examination of the ear canal may reveal granulation tissue in the inferior canal. It is treated with several weeks of IV and oral antibiotics, usually fluoroquinolones.

==== Mechanical obstruction ====
- Earwax impaction: results in 12 million medical visits annually in the United States. Cerumen impaction may cause ear pain, but it can also prevent thorough examination of the ear and identification of an alternate source of pain.
- Foreign body: commonly include insects or small objects like beads

==== Less common ====
- Herpes zoster: varicella zoster virus can reactivate in an area that includes the ear. Reactivation can produce pain and visible vesicles within the ear canal and, when combined with facial paralysis due to facial nerve involvement, is called Ramsay Hunt syndrome.
- Tumors: the most common ear canal tumor is squamous cell carcinoma. Symptoms can resemble those of otitis externa, and cancer should be considered if the symptoms are not improving on appropriate treatment.

=== Middle and inner ear ===
==== Acute otitis media ====
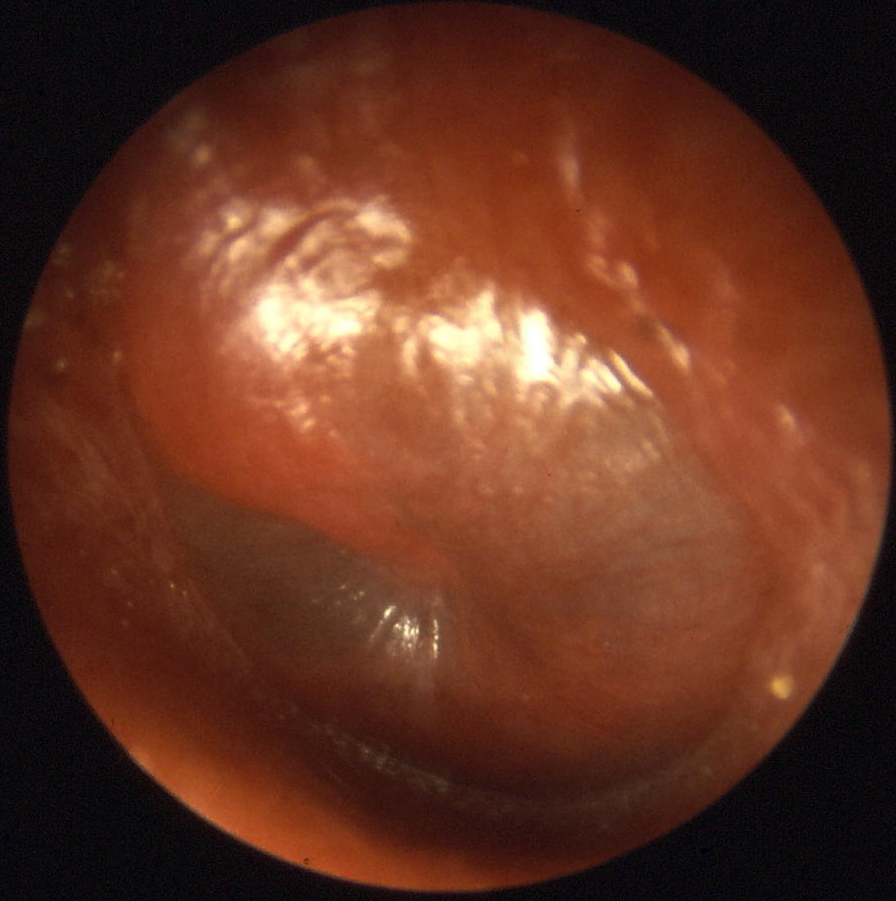
Otitis media

Acute otitis media is an infection of the middle ear. More than 80% of children experience at least one episode of otitis media by age 3 years. Acute otitis media is also most common in these first 3 years of life, though older children may also experience it. The most common causative bacteria are Streptococcus pneumoniae, Haemophilus influenzae, and Moraxella catarrhalis. Otitis media often occurs with or following cold symptoms. The diagnosis is made by the combination of symptoms and examination of the tympanic membrane for redness, bulging, and/or a middle ear effusion (collection of fluid within the middle ear).

Complications of otitis media include hearing loss, facial nerve paralysis, or extension of infection to surrounding anatomic structures, including:

- Mastoiditis: infection of the air cells in the mastoid process, the area of the skull located right behind the ear
- Petrositis: infection of the petrous portion of the temporal bone
- Labyrinthitis
- Meningitis
- Subdural abscess
- Brain abscess
- Cerebral venous sinus thrombosis

==== Trauma ====
- Barotrauma: results from changes in atmospheric pressure that occur, for example, when descending in a plane or deep diving. As atmospheric pressure increases with descent, the eustachian tube collapses due to pressure within the middle ear being less than the external pressure, which causes pain. In severe cases, middle ear hemorrhage or tympanic membrane rupture can result.
- Tympanic membrane rupture: disruption of the eardrum. This can be caused by a blow to the ear, blast injury, barotrauma, or direct penetration of the tympanic membrane by an object entering the ear.
- Noxacusis (Pain Hyperacusis): causes pain in the ear when exposed to noise that typically does not cause pain. This has been thought to be caused by type II nerves responding to damage of the outer hair cells.

=== Referred ear pain ===
A variety of conditions can cause irritation of one of the nerves that provides sensation to the ear.

Conditions causing irritation the trigeminal nerve (cranial nerve V):

- Temporomandibular joint syndrome: inflammation or abnormal movements of the joint between the jaw and skull. These disorders are most common in women of childbearing age, and are uncommon in children younger than 10 years old.
- Myofascial pain syndrome: pain in the muscles involved in chewing. There may be certain parts of the muscles or tendons (connective tissue connecting the muscles to bones) that are especially painful when pressed
- Trigeminal neuralgia: attacks of shooting pain down the face that may be triggered by touching the face or temperature changes
- Dental pain from cavities or an abscess
- Oral cavity carcinoma

Conditions causing irritation of the facial nerve (cranial nerve VII) or glossopharyngeal nerve (cranial nerve IX):

- Tonsillitis: infection/inflammation of the tonsils
- Post-tonsillectomy: pain following surgical removal of the tonsils
- Pharyngitis: infection/inflammation of the throat
- Sinusitis
- Parotitis: inflammation of the parotid gland, the salivary gland right in front of the ear
- Carcinoma of the oropharynx (base of tongue, soft palate, pharyngeal wall, tonsils)

Conditions causing irritation of the vagus nerve (cranial nerve X):

- GERD
- Myocardial ischemia (inadequate oxygen supply to the heart muscle)

Conditions causing irritation of cervical nerves C2-C3:

- Cervical spine trauma, arthritis (joint inflammation), or tumor
- Temporal arteritis: an autoimmune disorder leading to inflammation of the temporal artery, a large artery in the head. This condition tends to occur in adults older than 50.

== Pathophysiology ==
=== Primary ear pain ===
The ear can be anatomically divided into the external ear, the external auditory canal, the middle ear, and the inner ear. These three are indistinguishable in terms of the pain experienced.

=== Secondary ear pain ===
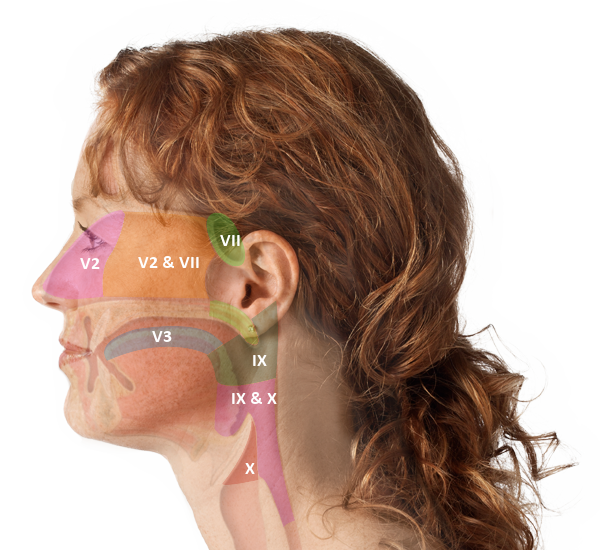
Referred otalgia from neck and head sources

Many different nerves provide sensation to the various parts of the ear, including cranial nerves V (trigeminal), VII (facial), IX (glossopharyngeal), and X (vagus), and the great auricular nerve (cervical nerves C2-C3). These nerves also supply other parts of the body, from the mouth to the chest and abdomen. Irritation of these nerves in another part of the body has the potential to produce pain in the ear. This is called referred pain. Irritation of the trigeminal nerve (cranial nerve V) is the most common cause of referred ear pain.

== Diagnostic ==
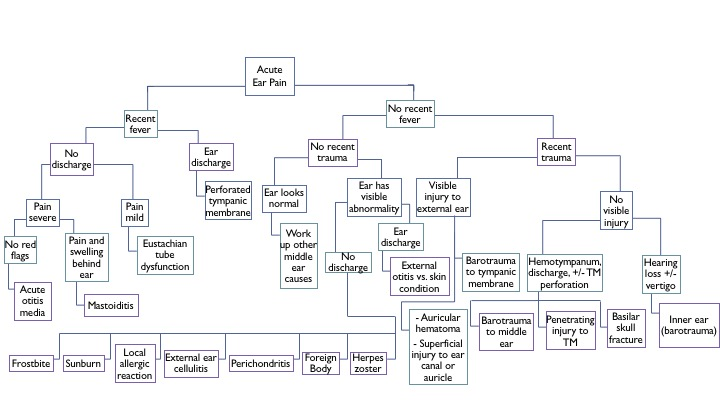
Acute ear pain decision tree

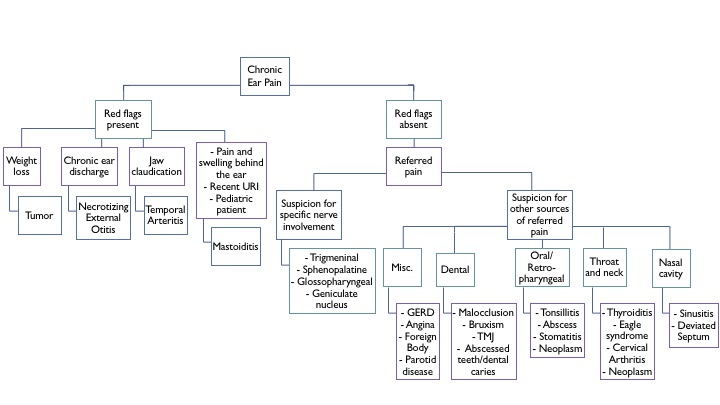
Chronic ear pain decision tree

While some disorders may require specific imaging or testing, most etiologies of ear pain are diagnosed clinically. Because the differential for ear pain is so broad, there is no consensus on the best diagnostic framework to use. One approach is to differentiate by time course, as primary causes of ear pain are typically more acute in nature, while secondary causes of ear pain are more chronic.

Acute causes may be further distinguished by the presence of fever (indicating an underlying infection) or the absence of fever (suggesting a structural problem, such as trauma or other injury to the ear). Etiologies leading to chronic pain may be broken down by the presence or absence of worrisome clinical features, also known as red flags.

One red flag is the presence of one or multiple risk factors including smoking, heavy alcohol use (greater than 3.5 drinks per day), diabetes, coronary artery disease, and older age (greater than 50). These factors increase the risk of having a serious cause of ear pain, like cancer or a serious infection. In particular, second hand smoke may increase risk of acute otitis media in children. In addition, swimming is the most significant risk factor for otitis externae, though other risk factors include high humidity in the ear canal, eczema and/or ear trauma.

If red flags are present it may be necessary to do additional workup such as a CT scan or biopsy to rule out a more dangerous diagnosis. Such diagnoses include malignant (or necrotizing) otitis externa, mastoiditis, temporal arteritis, and cancer. While the presence of a red flag does raise suspicion for one of these four disease, it does not guarantee a diagnosis as any one symptom can be seen in a variety of situations. For example, jaw claudication can be seen in temporal arteritis, but also in TMJ dysfunction.

If there are no red flags, other sources of referred ear pain become more likely and are reasonable to pursue.

Infectious causes
Diagnosis	Features		
Acute otitis media	History of URI within 10 days	Child pulling on ear	Severe pain; feels deep inside the ear.
Acute otitis media	Fever	Hearing loss	Pain may disrupt sleep
Perforated tympanic membrane	Discharge followed by pain improvement		
Mastoiditis*	Children	History of URI >10 days	Recent history of URI or ear infection
Mastoiditis*	Fevers/chills	May see signs of otitis media on exam	Pain is located behind the ear with postauricular (i.e. near mastoid process) swelling*
Mastoiditis*	Diagnose with CT		
Chronic suppurative otitis media	Conductive hearing loss	Relapsing/remitting or chronic discharge	May see perforation of tympanic membrane or cholesteatoma on exam
Serous otitis media (otitis media with effusion)	No signs of infection	Prominent hearing loss	May have history of URI or acute otitis media
Otitis externa	Swimming	Psoriasis	Seborrheic dermatitis
Otitis externa	Q-tips in the ear	Bilateral pain	Scaling
Otitis externa	Itching	Pain exacerbated when ear is pulled	May see granulation tissue in canal on exam
Necrotizing/malignant otitis externa*	Diabetes	Immuno-compromised	Constant pain with increasing severity at night*
Necrotizing/malignant otitis externa*	Purulent discharge*	Pain out of proportion to exam findings*	Biopsy granulation tissue for culture
Chondritis vs perichondritis	Recent ear trauma (i.e. ear piercing)	External ear appears inflamed	Chondritis more likely than perichondritis if ear shape is distorted

Referred causes
Diagnosis	Features	
GERD	Bilateral pain	
Neuralgia	Pain described as tingling/sharp/burning sensation; episodes can start with light touch	
Malignancy*	Weight loss*	
Arthritis of the neck	Pain exacerbated by neck movement	
Eagle syndrome	Swallowing exacerbates pain	
Infected 3rd molar	Extreme food temperatures exacerbate pain	
Temporal arteritis*	Patient age > 50*	Chewing exacerbates pain*
TMJ dysfunction	Patient grinds teeth	Bilateral pain
TMJ dysfunction	Pain + crepitus with TMJ palpation	Jaw clicking

*Indicates a "Can't Miss" diagnosis or a red flag.

Other causes
Diagnosis	Features		
Barotrauma	Recent ear trauma	Recent scuba diving or flying (+/- onset of pain coinciding with event)	Hearing loss
Eustachian tube dysfunction	Pain described as ear pressure or "plugged up" sensation in ears	Unilateral hearing loss	Crackling/gurgling sounds in ear
Eustachian tube dysfunction	History of seasonal allergies	Poor light reflex and TM mobility	Air-fluid levels present
Cerumen Impaction	Q-tips in the ear	Pain described as ear pressure or "plugged up" sensation in ears	May need to remove any ear wax present to rule this out as the underlying etiology

== Management ==
Management of ear pain depends on the underlying cause.

=== Antibiotics ===
While not all causes of ear pain are treated with antibiotics, those caused by bacterial infections of the ear are usually treated with antibiotics known to cover the common bacterial organisms for that type of infection. Many bacterial ear infections are treated with cleaning of the area, topical or systemic antibiotics, and oral analgesics for comfort. Some types of bacterial ear infections can benefit from warm compresses included in the treatment. Some of the causes of ear pain that are typically treated with either a topical or systemic antibiotic include:

- Uncomplicated acute bacterial otitis externa (AOE). For symptoms that are not responsive to treatment within 10 days, a physician should evaluate for necrotizing external otitis.
- Acute otitis media (AOM) self-resolves within 24–48 hours in 80% of cases. If it does not self-resolve, AOM thought to be caused by bacteria is treated with systemic antibiotics. If symptoms do not respond to a week of treatment, a physician should evaluate for mastoiditis.
- Acute folliculitis.
- Auricular cellulitis.
- Suppurative otitis media. There is also a risk for tympanic membrane rupture.
- Perichondritis. An otorhinolaryngologist should also evaluate it and if a foreign body is present in the cartilage, this foreign body should be removed. If there is cartilage involvement, then more advance care with hospitalization is needed.
- Sinusitis can cause secondary ear pain. Treating the underlying sinusitis will treat the ear pain. (See sinusitis.)

Some bacterial infections may require a more advanced treatment with evaluation by otorhinolaryngology, IV antibiotics, and hospital admission.

- Necrotizing external otitis is potentially fatal and should be evaluated by an otorhinolaryngologist with admission to the hospital and IV antibiotics.(See otitis externa.)
- Acute mastoiditis is treated with admission to the hospital, otorhinolaryngology consultation and empiric IV antibiotics. Cases with intracranial involvement are treated with a mastoidectomy with myringotomy.
- Chondritis.

=== Procedures ===
Some causes of ear pain require procedural management alone, by a health professional, or in addition to antibiotic therapy.

- Keratosis obturans is treated with removal of impacted desquamated keratin debris in the ear canal.
- Chronic perichondritis and chondritis that continues to be symptomatic despite appropriate antibiotic management may require surgical debridement. Surgical drainage could be required.
- Bullous myringitis leads to the development of bullae on the tympanic membrane that can be punctured to give pain relief.
- Foreign body in the ear canal can cause pain and be treated with careful removal.
- Infected sebaceous cyst is treated with incision and drainage of the cysts, oral antibiotics and otorhinolaryngology assessment.

=== Other ===
Given the variety of causes of ear pain, some causes require treatment other than antibiotics and procedures.

- Relapsing polychondritis is an autoimmune disease treated with immunomodulating medications (medications that help modulate the immune system).
- Temporomandibular joint dysfunction can lead to secondary ear pain and can be initially treated with a soft food diet, NSAIDs, application of a heat pack, massage of local area, and a referral to a dentist.
- Myofascial pain syndromes are initially treated with NSAIDs and physical therapy. Local anesthetic injection into the muscle trigger point can be considered in severe cases.
- Glossopharyngeal neuralgia is treated with carbamazepine.

== Epidemiology ==
2/3 of people presenting with ear pain were diagnosed with some sort of primary otalgia and 1/3 were diagnosed with some sort secondary otalgia.

A common cause of primary otalgia is ear infection called otitis media, meaning an infection behind the eardrum. The peak age for children to get acute otitis media is ages 6–24 months. One review paper wrote that 83% of children had at least one episode of acute otitis media by 3 years of age. Worldwide, there are 709 millions cases of acute otitis media every year. Hearing loss globally due to ear infection is estimated to be 30 people in every 10,000. Around the world there is around 21,000 to 28,000 deaths due to complications from ear infections. These complications include brain abscesses and meningitis.

Otitis externae peaks at age 7–12 years of age and around 10% of people has had it at least once in their lives.

Cerumen impaction occurs in 1 out of every 10 children, 1 in every 20 adults and 1 in every 3 elderly citizens.

Barotrauma occurs around 1 in every 1000 people.

Of people presenting with ear pain, only 3% was diagnosed with eustachian tube dysfunction.

== History ==
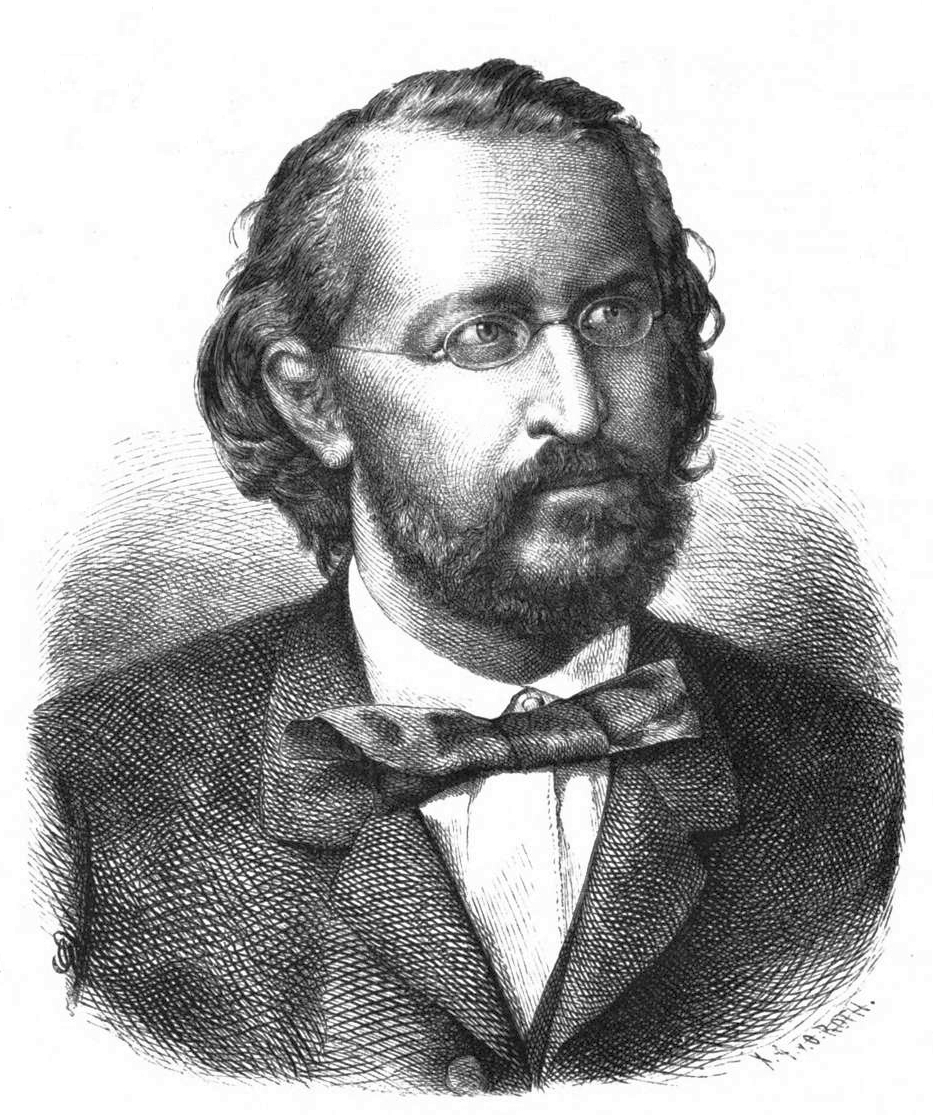
Professor Anton Friedrich von Tröltsch 1869 O. Roth, Inventor of the otoscope

Not much was known about ear pain and acute otitis media before the 17th century. It was a common phenomenon with no treatment. That changed when the otoscope was invented in the 1840s by Anton von Troeltsh in Germany. Another shift came with the invention of antibiotics. Before antibiotics was introduced there used to be a high rate of ear infections spreading to the bone around the ear, but that is now considered a rare complication.

== Society and culture ==
There was previously a strong tradition of treating acute otitis media with amoxicillin. One quote from the 1980s shows this sentiment by saying "any child with an earache has an acute amoxicillin deficiency". However, people started realizing that using antibiotics too much can cause bacteria to gain resistance. Increasing resistance makes antibiotics less effective. The term antibiotic stewardship is then used to describe the systematic effort to educate antibiotic prescribers to only give these medications when they are warranted. In particular to children, most ear pain resolves by itself with no complications. There are guidelines in place to help determine when antibiotics for ear pain are needed in children.

The ear itself played a role in treatment via acupuncture, also known as auriculotherapy. It was believed that acupuncture of the ear could be used to correct other pain or disorders in the body. Such practices may have started as far back as the Stone Age. The first documentation of auriculotherapy in Europe was in the 1600s. One physician described stimulating the ear by burning or scarring to treat sciatic pain, while another physician applied this treatment for toothache. Paul Nogier is known as the father of ear acupuncture for his theory that parts of the ear corresponds to other areas of the body in a reliable fashion.

== Research ==
There are currently studies going on delivering antibiotics directly into the middle ear.
