= Surfer's ear =

Common name for an abnormal bone growth within the external ear canal

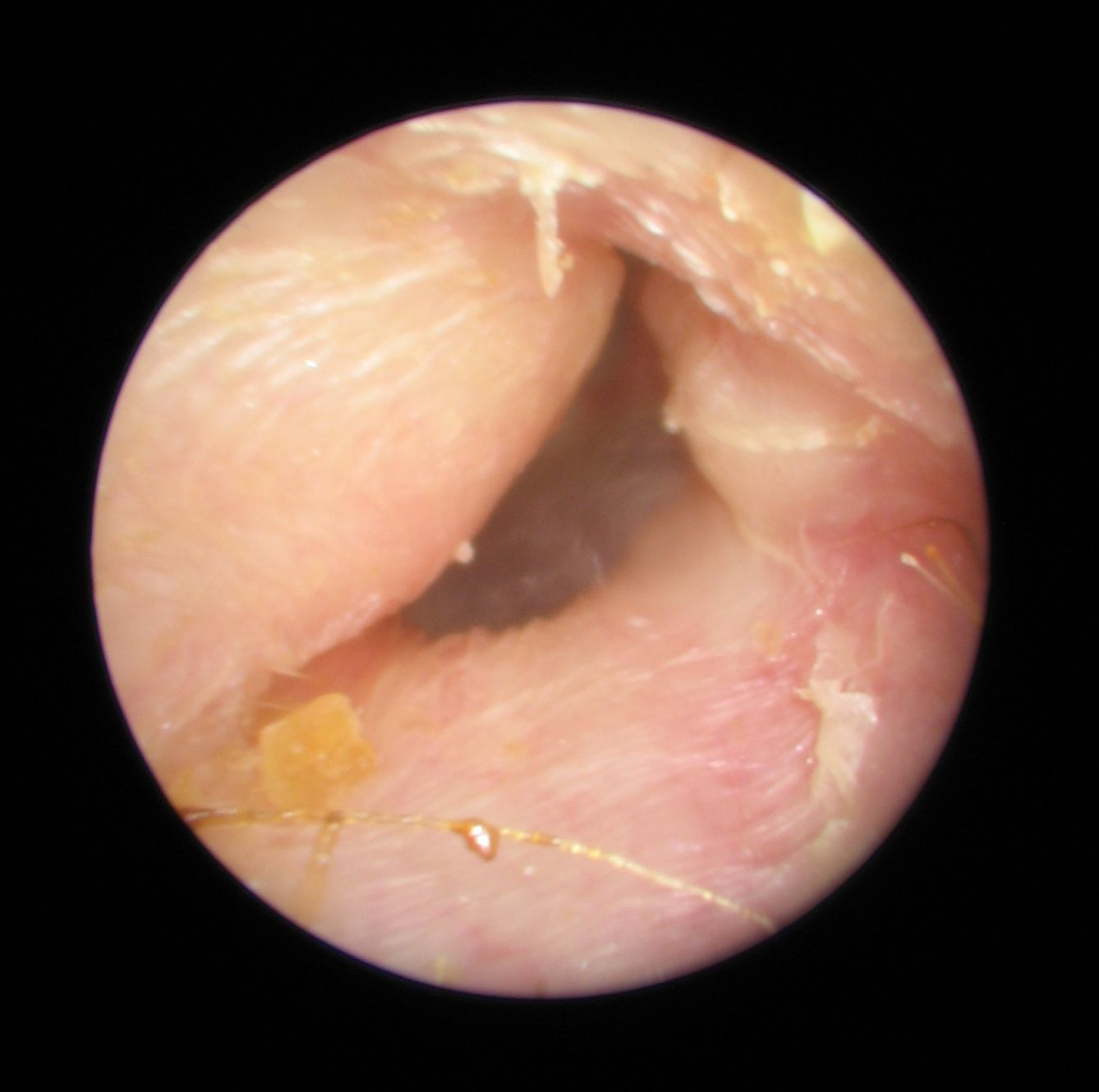
- Exostoses in the ear canal, as seen through otoscopy
- Specialty: ENT surgery

External auditory canal exostoses (EAE), commonly known as Surfer's ear, is the name for an exostosis or abnormal bone growth within the ear canal. They are otherwise benign hyperplasias (growths) of the tympanic bone and are strongly associated with frequent cold-water and wind exposure.

Cases are often asymptomatic but noticeable. Irritation from cold water and wind exposure cause the bone surrounding the ear canal to develop lumps of new bony growth which constrict the ear canal. When the ear canal is actually blocked by this condition, water and wax can become trapped and give rise to reocurring infection (otitis externa). The blockage causes individuals to experience a sense of fullness, conductive hearing loss, and pain in the ear.

The condition is named due to its high prevalence among cold water surfers, although it can occur in any water temperature due to the presence of water in the ear canal. Despite the name, anyone who regularly spends time in cold or windy water is at risk such as kayakers, swimmers, and water athletes.

Most avid surfers have at least some mild bone growths, causing little to no problems. The condition is gradually progressive and gets worse over time. It can generally be prevented by shielding the ear from water by consistently using earplugs and wetsuit hoods. The condition is not limited to surfing and can occur in any activity with cold, wet, windy conditions such as windsurfing, kayaking, sailing, jet skiing, kitesurfing, and diving.

== Signs and symptoms ==
In general, one ear will be somewhat worse than the other due to the prevailing wind direction of the area surfed or the side that most often strikes the wave first. Common symptoms include recurrent ear infections, obstructed sensation, conductive hearing loss, pain in the ear, and tinnitus.

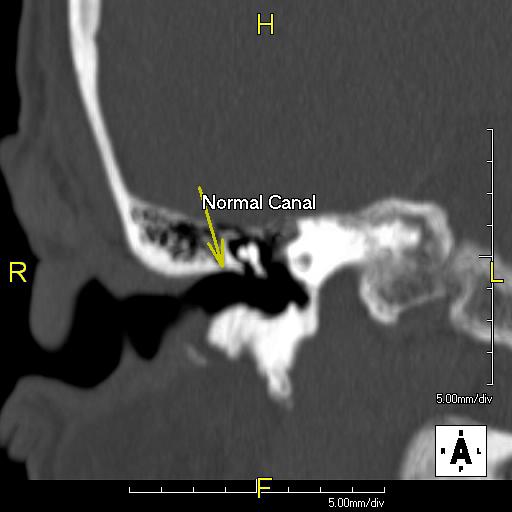
Normal ear canal

Normal ear canal

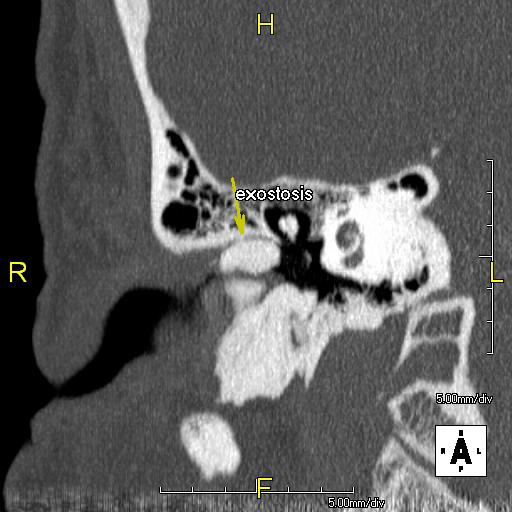
Exostosis in ear canal

Exostosis in ear canal

== Causes ==
The majority of patients present in their mid-30s to late 40s. This is likely due to a combination of the slow growth of the bone and the decreased participation in activities associated with surfer's ear past the 30s. However, surfer's ear is possible at any age and is directly proportional to the amount of time spent in cold, wet, windy weather without adequate protection. The broad-based bony ridges formed by the body are part of its defense mechanism.

The normal ear canal is approximately 7mm in diameter and has a volume of approximately 0.8ml (approximately one-sixth of a teaspoon). As the condition progresses, the diameter narrows and can even close completely if untreated, although people generally seek help once the passage has constricted to 0.5–2 mm due to the noticeable hearing impairment. While not necessarily harmful in and of itself, constriction of the ear canal from these growths can trap debris, leading to painful and difficult to treat infections.

== Complications ==
The size of the bone growth is directly proportional to severity of complications present. Complications progressively get worse the more time one spends exposed to the elements. Hearing loss is the primary complication of surfers ear, especially as one ages. The reason the hearing loss occurs is because the bone growth in the ear makes it is harder for trapped water to escape. The blocked water impacts the cerumen (earwax) glands and puts pressure on the tympanic membrane (eardrum). In severe cases with high impact water sport athletes like surfing, the eardrum can rupture due to the pressure. Surfer's ear is not the same as swimmer's ear, although recurring infection can result as a side effect because of the trapped water.

== Prevalence ==
A 2023 study found that the prevalence of surfer's ear among surfers was as high as 73%, largely depending on sea temperature of the geographical area studied, with higher prevalence in colder climates. The severity of the condition is directly correlated to the amount of time the ear is exposed to cold and windy atmosphere.

== Prevention ==
The widespread use of wetsuits has allowed people to surf in much colder waters, which has increased the incidences and severity of surfer's ear for people who do not properly protect their ears. Preventative measures include avoiding activity during extremely cold or windy conditions, and keeping the ear canal as warm and dry as possible through the use of earplugs and wetsuit hoods. Ear putty is also available as a protective measure. The putty can provide a tighter seal than earplugs, but can also restrict hearing. In one study, two thirds of 92 surfers were aware that surfer's ear could be prevented. One study suggests that in kayaking, since surfer's ear is a slowly progressive condition, kayakers may not wear earplugs until symptoms appear.

== Treatment ==
Outside of symptom relief, the only treatment is surgical removal of the formed exostoses. Although not an especially hazardous surgery, exostosis removal can result in major complications such as facial nerve paralysis, canal stenosis, temporomandibular joint prolapse, hearing loss, persistent deep bony lip, and persistent eardrum perforations.

Surgical techniques include drilling the bone off and later cleaning debris using a osteotome, typically under local anesthesia or general anesthesia with the use of a microscope. After surgery, it is recommended to continue keeping the ear clear of water, and in one study, using ciprofloxacin / hydrocortisone drops was recommended for one week post-surgery to avoid infection, and 90% of the study group had fully healed after four weeks.

== See also ==
- Surfer's myelopathy – Spinal cord injury
- Swimmers ear
- Pterygium (conjunctiva) – Triangular tissue growth on the cornea
