= Perforated eardrum =

Injury leading to a hole in the eardrum

- Other names: Punctured eardrum
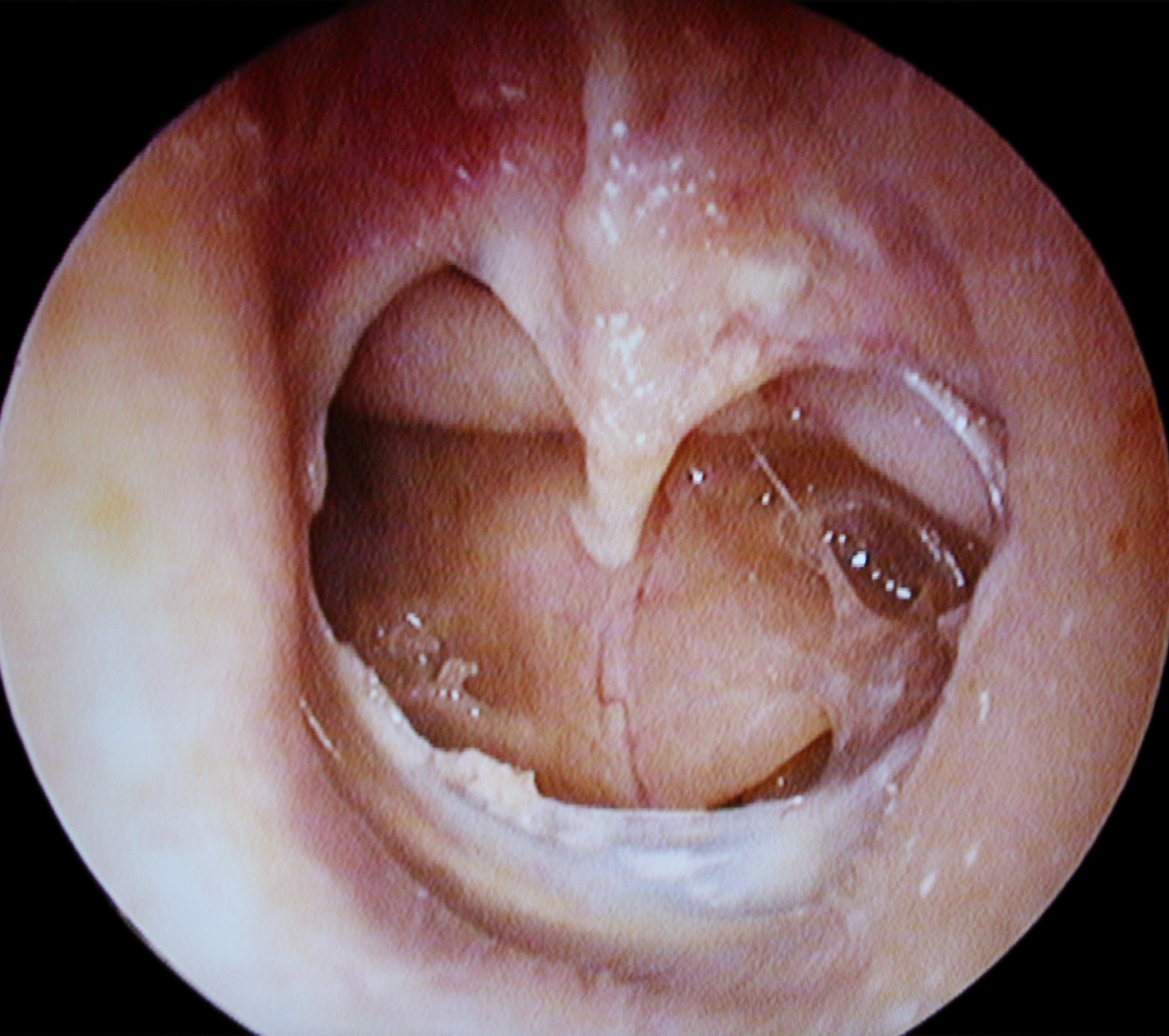
- A completely perforated eardrum, showing the handle of the malleus (hammer bone).
- Specialty: ENT surgery
- Symptoms: conductive hearing loss, tinnitus, ear pain, vertigo
- Causes: ear infection, physical trauma, overpressure, ear cleaning
- Diagnostic method: otoscopy
- Treatment: conservative or surgery

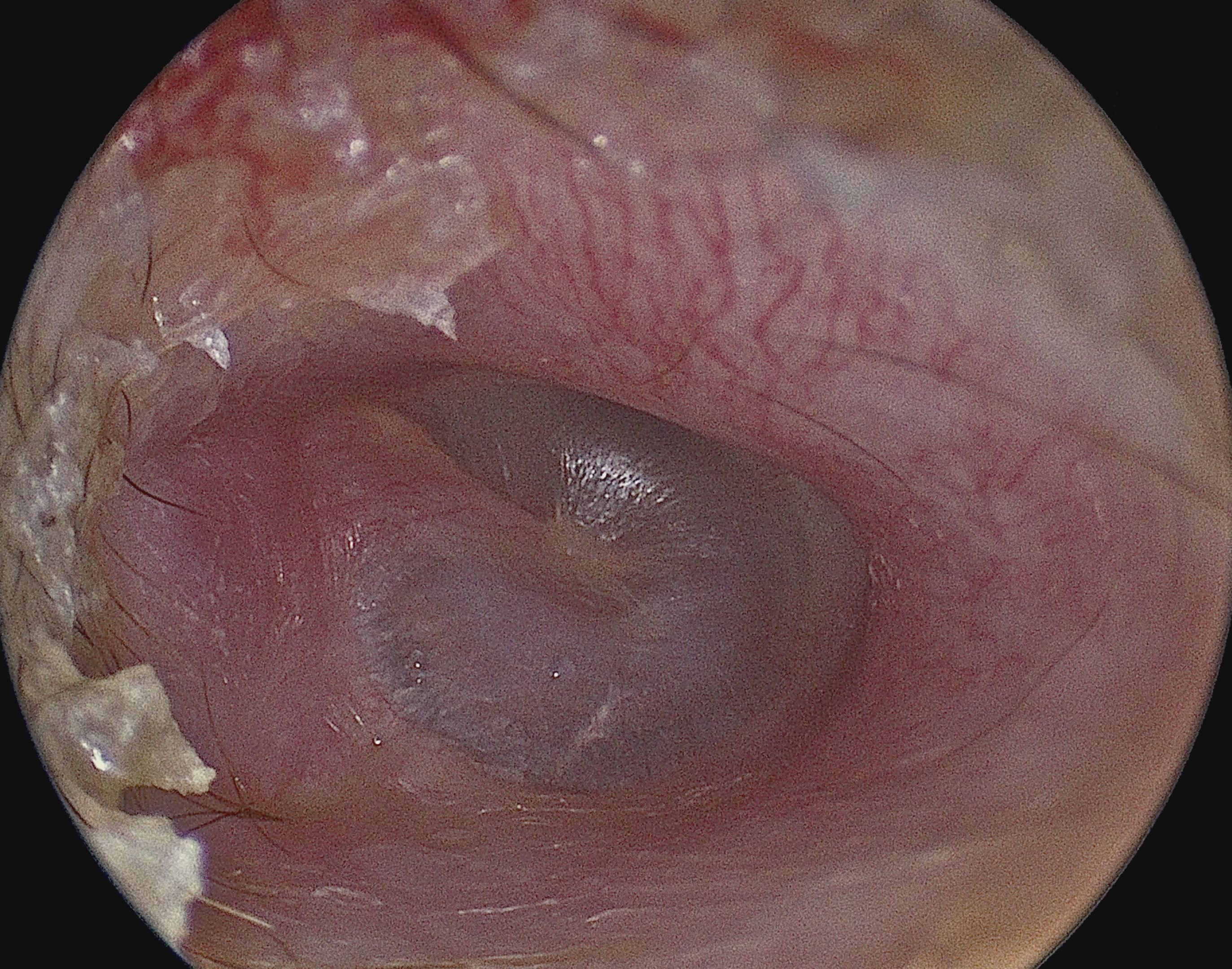
Normal ear drum

A perforated eardrum (tympanic membrane perforation) is a prick in the eardrum. It can be caused by infection (otitis media), trauma, overpressure (loud noise), inappropriate ear clearing, and changes in middle ear pressure. An otoscope can be used to view the eardrum to diagnose a perforation. Perforations may heal naturally or require surgery.

== Presentation ==
A perforated eardrum leads to conductive hearing loss, which is usually temporary. Other symptoms may include tinnitus, ear pain, vertigo, or a discharge of mucus. Nausea and/or vomiting secondary to vertigo may occur.

== Causes ==
A perforated eardrum can have one of many causes, such as:

- Infection (otitis media). This infection may then spread through the middle ear and may reoccur.
- Trauma. This may be caused by trying to clean ear wax with sharp instruments. It may also occur due to surgical complications.
- Overpressure (loud noise or shockwave from an explosion).
- Inappropriate ear clearing.
- Flying with a severe cold, due to changes in air pressure and blocked Eustachian tubes resulting from the cold. This is especially true on landing.

== Diagnosis ==
An otoscope can be used to look at the ear canal. This gives a view of the ear canal and eardrum, so that a perforated eardrum can be seen. Tympanometry may also be used.

== Treatment ==
=== Conservative management ===
A perforated eardrum often heals naturally. It may heal in a few weeks or may take up to a few months.

=== Surgery ===
Some perforations require surgical intervention. This may take the form of a paper patch to promote healing (a simple procedure by an ear, nose and throat specialist), or surgery (tympanoplasty). However, in some cases, the perforation can last several years and will be unable to heal naturally. For patients with persistent perforation, surgery is usually undertaken to close the perforation. The objective of the surgery is to provide a platform of sort to support the regrowth and healing of the tympanic membrane in the two weeks post-surgery period. There are two ways of doing the surgery:

1. Traditional tympanoplasty, usually using the microscope and performed through a 10 cm incision behind the ear lobe. This technique was introduced by Wullstien and Zollner and popularized by the Jim Sheehy at the House Ear Institute.
2. Endoscopic tympanoplasty, usually using the endoscope through the ear canal without the need for incision. This technique was introduced and popularized by Professor Tarabichi of TSESI: Tarabichi Stammberger Ear and Sinus Institute.

The success of surgery is variable based on the cause of perforation and the technique being used. Predictors of success include traumatic perforation, dry ear, and central perforations. Predictors of failure includes young age and poor Eustachian tube function. The use of minimally invasive endoscopic technique does not reduce the chance of successful outcome. Hearing is usually recovered fully, but chronic infection over a long period may lead to permanent hearing loss. Those with more severe ruptures may need to wear an ear plug to prevent water contact with the ear drum.
