= Bullous myringitis hemorrhagica =

Type of eardrum infection

Bullous myringitis haemorrhagica
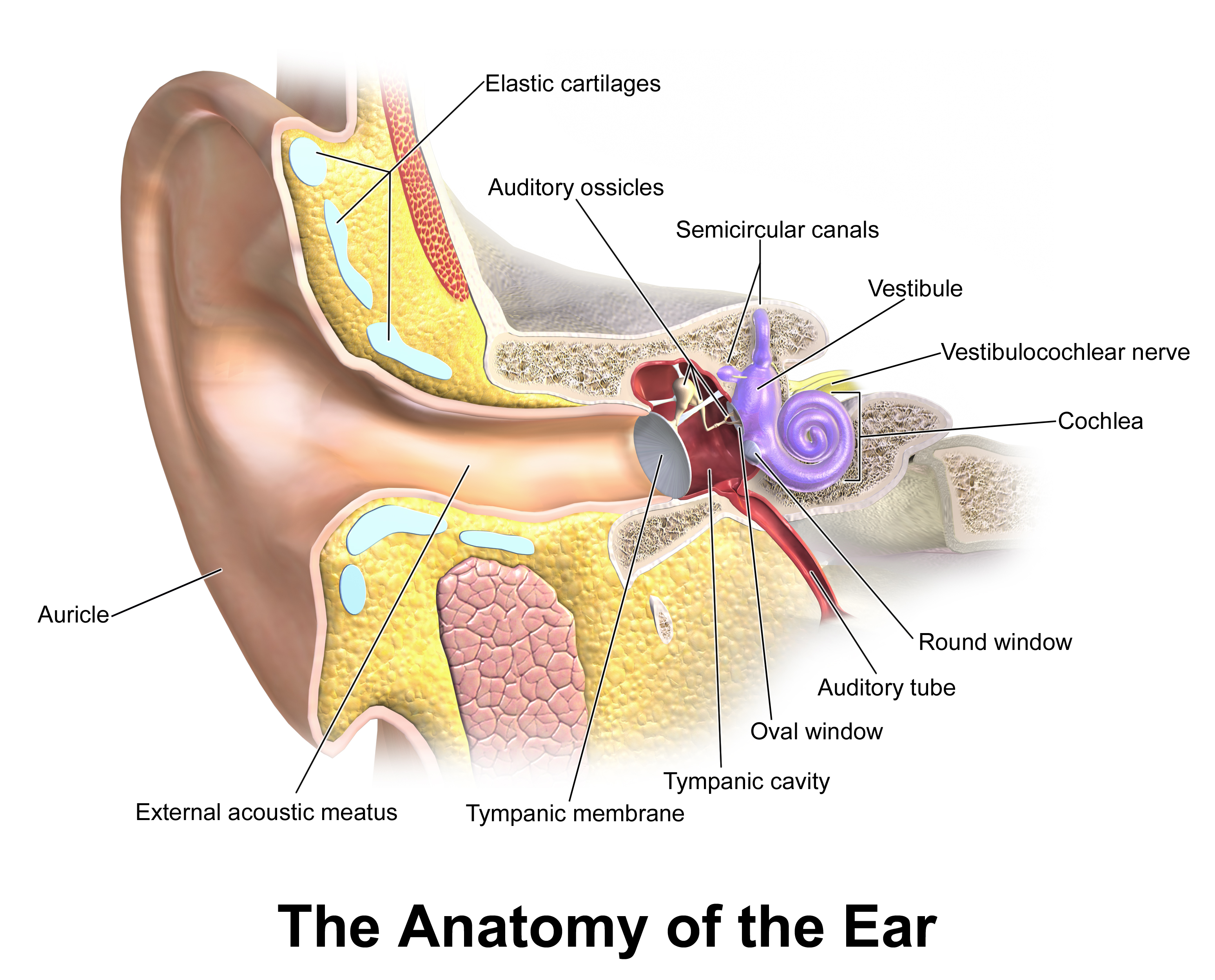
- Specialty: Otorhinolaryngology
- Symptoms: Ear pain
- Causes: Virus
- Diagnostic method: Otoscope
- Treatment: High-dose oral antibiotics

Bullous myringitis haemorrhagica or bullous myringitis is a painful medical condition characterized by an infection of the eardrum or tympanic membrane. Bullous myringitis is an infection on or around the tympanic membrane that results in fluid-filled blisters that look like bubbles.

== Symptoms and signs ==
Patients with Bullous myringitis haemorrhagica commonly experience severe ear pain, which is the most significant and prevalent symptom. Additionally, a slight blood-colored, watery discharge may occur if the bullae rupture, and mild deafness can be observed.

== Causes ==
Bullous myringitis, often caused by viruses and sometimes by bacteria, inflames the eardrum, forming fluid-filled blisters. It can be associated with middle or external ear infections but the main focus on the eardrum and nearby skin.

== Diagnosis ==
Diagnosing bullous myringitis involves using an otoscope to spot distinctive white sack-like structures on the eardrum. Ear pain is the primary complaint. However, differentiating it from acute otitis media can be difficult, leading to early misdiagnosis.The rarity of bullous myringitis, especially compared to acute otitis media, can result in common misdiagnoses. Practitioners often mistake it for the more prevalent condition, leading to delayed or incorrect treatment.

=== Differential diagnosis ===
Bullous myringitis, when mistaken for acute otitis media, can lead to complications . Recurring episodes may persist even after completing antibiotics. To avoid misdiagnosis, doctors should keep bullous myringitis in mind during diagnosis for timely treatment.

== Treatment ==
Treating bullous myringitis involves strong oral antibiotics to fight the infection, which might take some time to fully go away. It's important to get the right dose based on the infection's severity. Pain is managed with oral painkillers, and in severe cases, a first dose of intravenous pain relief may be given before switching to oral medication.

== Etymology ==
The condition can be understood via looking at the different words, and hence understanding about the disease. for example, Bullous: The term "bullous" derives from the Latin word "bulla," meaning bubble, indicating the presence of these fluid-filled structures.
