= Head mirror =

Diagnostic device

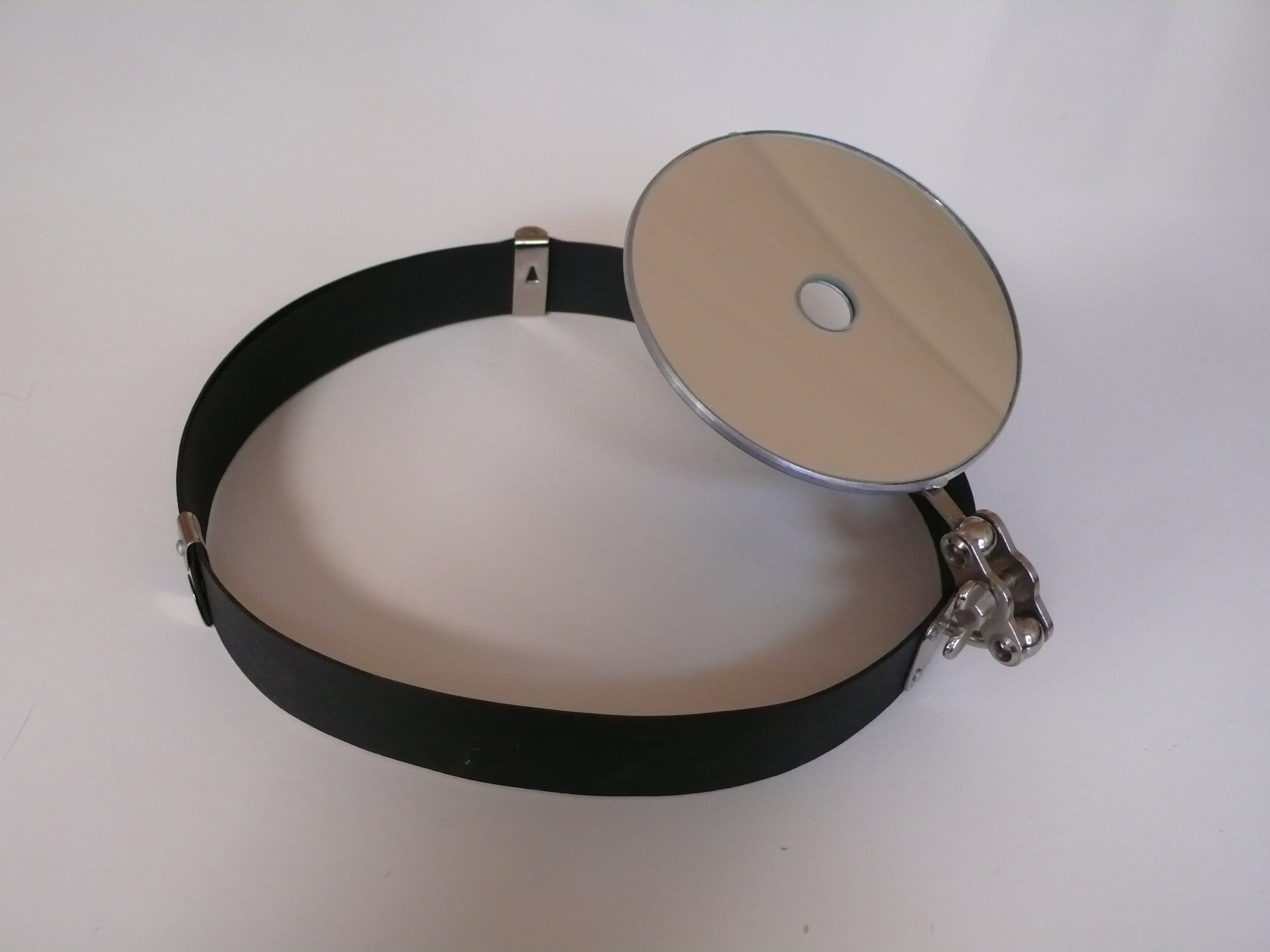
Head mirror

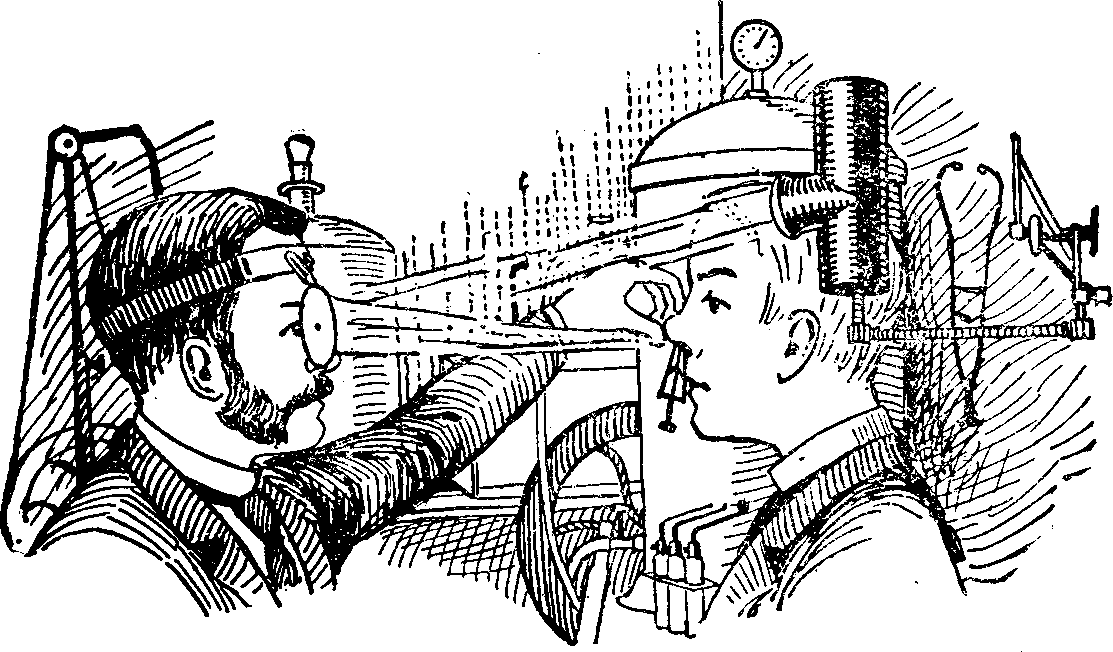
A doctor using a head mirror to illuminate his patient's nasal passages.

A head mirror is a simple diagnostic device, stereotypically worn by physicians, but less so in recent decades as they have become largely obsolete.

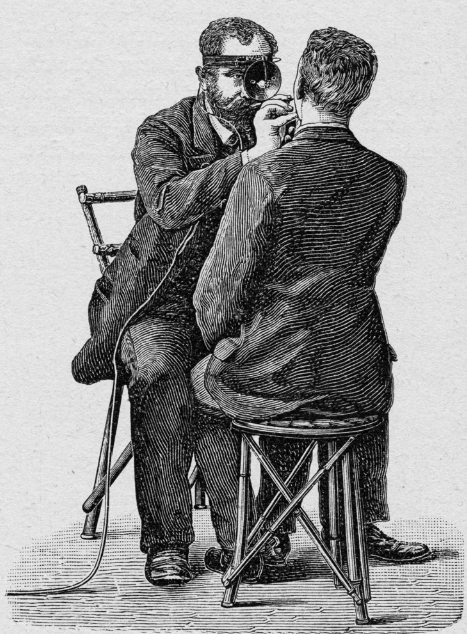
"Clar's mirror" advertised in a 1908 catalog from Austria showing an innovation based on the work of Conrad Clar

A head mirror is mostly used for examination of the ear, nose and throat (ENT). It comprises a circular concave mirror, with a small hole in the middle, and is attached to a headband. The mirror is worn over the physician's eye of choice, with the concave mirror surface facing outwards and the hole directly over the physician's eye, providing illumination like a ring light.

In use, the patient sits and faces the physician. A bright lamp is positioned adjacent to the patient's head, pointing toward the physician's face and hence towards the head mirror. The light from the lamp reflects off the mirror, along the line of sight of the user, with the light being somewhat concentrated by the curvature of the mirror. When used properly, the head mirror thus provides excellent shadow-free illumination.

Because they were once in common use, notably by general practitioners and otorhinolaryngologists, head mirrors are often used as a stereotypical part of a physician's uniform by costumers and as props in comic routines. The main drawback to head mirrors was that they required some skill to use well. They are rarely seen outside of the ENT setting, having been largely replaced by pen lights among general practitioners. They are still used by some otolaryngologists, particularly for examinations and procedures involving the oral cavity, although many have switched to fiber optic headlights.

== See also ==
- Otoscope – Medical device for examining the ears
