= Autoinflation =

- Specialty: Otolaryngology

Autoinflation is a minimally invasive procedure to treat serous non-infectious otitis media, in which a nasal balloon is inserted into the nasopharynx, followed by the application of pressure to the sinus cavities by forcibly contracting the diaphragm against the closed nasal passageways. It can also be performed by manually pinching the nasal passages and closing the back of the pharynx, followed by forceful contraction of the diaphragm.

It may provide short-term relief of symptoms in cases of otitis media with effusion (colloquially known as glue ear). However, it is not recommended as a long-term treatment of otitis media with effusion due to the variable effectiveness of the treatment in studies, as well as a lack of high-quality evidence to suggest that the long-term benefits of using autoinflation in glue ear outweigh the inconveniences of regularly performing the procedure and the risk of pain.
