= Keratosis obturans =

Relatively uncommon ear disease

keratosis obturans
- Specialty: ENT
- Symptoms: Hearing loss, pain
- Complications: Expansion of ear canal, facial nerve damage
- Differential diagnosis: Impacted wax, external ear canal cholesteatoma
- Treatment: Initial removal of keratin plug; other measures as required
- Frequency: 4 to 5 per 1000 new otological cases

Keratosis obturans is a relatively uncommon ear disease, where a dense plug of keratin, formed by abnormal accumulation of desquamated skin in sheet-like layers (lamellae), forms in the bony (deeper) part of the external auditory canal. It is clinically diagnosed when removal of the debris shows silvery white peripheral matrix and causes excruciating pain.

== Discovery ==
Keratosis obturans was first properly described by Wreden of St. Petersburg in 1874, who differentiated this condition from impacted wax. Peipergedes and Behnke were the first to define the distinctions between the two.

== Signs and symptoms ==
The most common symptoms are hearing loss and severe pain secondary to the accumulation of keratin in the ear canal. Keratosis obturans has been classified into four grades depending on the severity of symptoms:

Grade I
Mild pain ± ear block with the presence of accumulated keratin enveloped by a tightly adherent matrix; no discernible expansion of external canal.
Grade II
Moderate to severe pain ± conductive deafness; presence of accumulated keratin enveloped by a tightly adherent matrix with mild expansion of the bony canal in the presence of keratosis. obturans.
Grade III
Moderate to severe pain ± conductive deafness; presence of accumulated keratin enveloped by a tightly adherent matrix with expanded bony canal with granulation tissue at the osteo-cartilaginous junction.
Grade IV
Presence of accumulated keratin enveloped by a tightly adherent matrix (grade III) with exposure of the mastoid air cells with or without facial nerve involvement.

== Diagnosis ==
The diagnosis of keratosis obturans is clinical. Differentiation between keratosis obturans and impacted wax is difficult at first presentation. It is diagnosed only when attempted removal of the substance causes excruciating pain, and shows silvery white peripheral matrix. When the matrix is peeled, new capillaries that were formed within the matrix rupture, resulting in bleeding. It is possible that these new capillaries are formed as a result of inflammation of the surrounding bony canal.

== Treatment ==
Canaloplasty, where the ear canal is widened using grafts, was first proposed as the treatment for keratois obturans. However, with the migration of keratin within the canal, any amount of widening could not restore the migration of skin. Reconstruction of the bony canal with cartilage graft from temporalis fascia has showed some results. But firstly preferred is cleaning with 1 percent acetic acid.
