= Perichondritis =

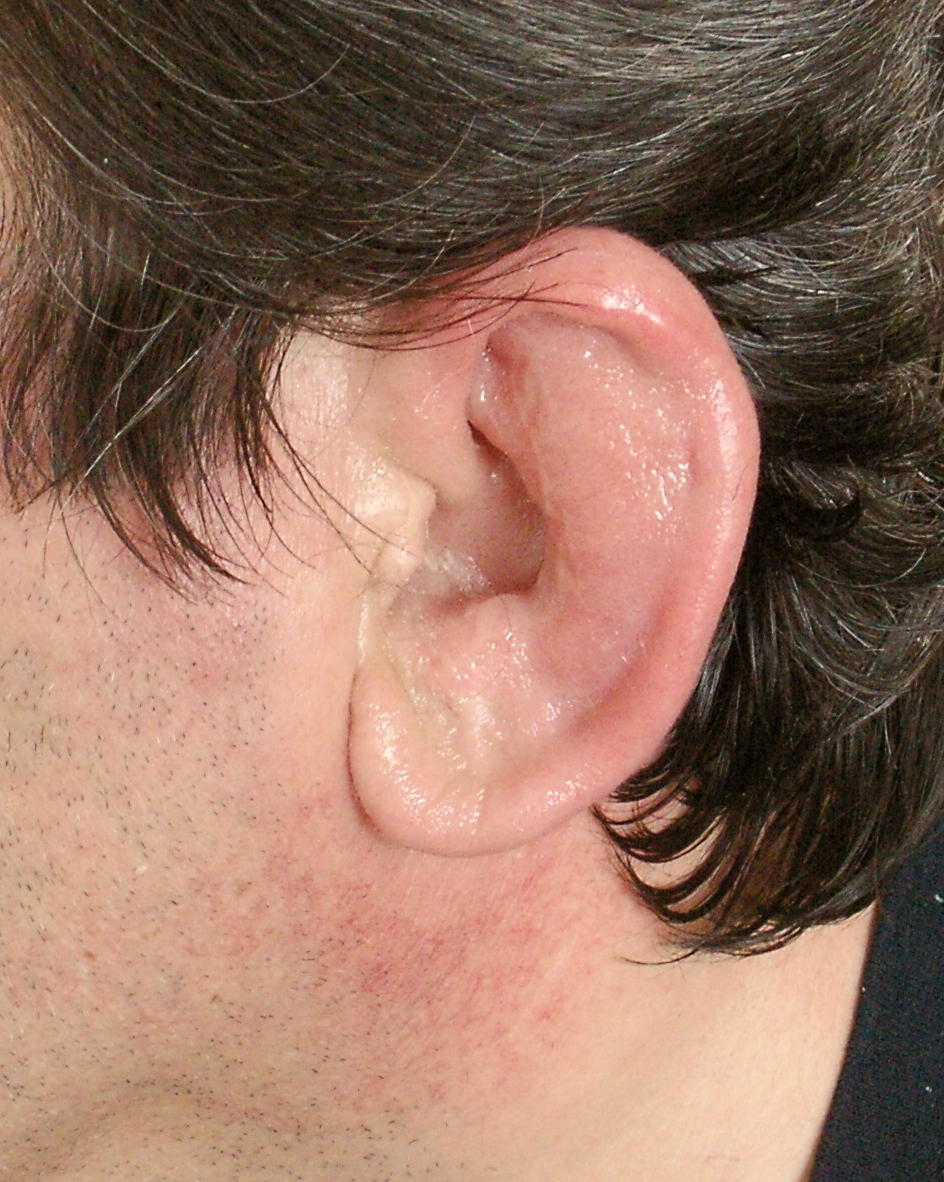
- Perichondritis of the pinna
- Specialty: Otorhinolaryngology
- Differential diagnosis: Otitis externa

Perichondritis is inflammation of the perichondrium, a layer of connective tissue which surrounds cartilage. A common form, auricular perichondritis (perichondritis auriculae) involves infection of the pinna due to infection of traumatic or surgical wound or the spread of inflammation into depth (e.g. Infected transcartilaginous ear piercings). It may lead to severe deformation of the pinna if not treated vigorously with IV antibiotics. The causative organism is usually Pseudomonas aeruginosa. A rare form is laryngeal perichondritis (perichondritis laryngis). It develops suddenly due to an injury, virulent organisms or compromised immune status of the host, and also affects cartilage of the larynx. This may result in deformations and stenoses.

== Signs and symptoms ==
Signs of perichondritis or chondritis in patients with an embedded earring are similar (these include pain, swelling and erythema of the overlying skin) and fluctuant swelling indicate an abscess that we should drain (typically associated with chondritis). Clinically, perichondritis can be differentiated from cellulitis of the pinna, in that the first usually does not involve the earlobe.

In serious cases pus appears between the perichondrium and cartilage. Purulent melting of auricular cartilage takes place. Dead tissue tears away, as a result, auricle deforms strongly and becomes shrunken.

== See also ==
- Chondritis
