= Otitis externa =

Inflammation of the ear canal

- Other names: External otitis, swimmer's ear
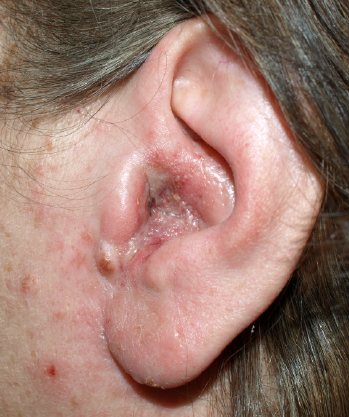
- A moderate case of otitis externa. There is narrowing of the ear channel, with a small amount of exudate and swelling of the outer ear.
- Specialty: Otorhinolaryngology
- Symptoms: Ear pain, swelling of the ear canal, decreased hearing, difficulty chewing
- Types: Acute, chronic
- Causes: Bacterial infection, allergies, autoimmune disorders
- Risk factors: Swimming, minor trauma from cleaning, using hearing aids or ear plugs, diabetes, psoriasis, dermatitis
- Diagnostic method: Based on symptoms, microbial culture
- Differential diagnosis: Perichondritis
- Prevention: Acetic acid ear drops
- Treatment: Antibiotic drops such as ofloxacin, acetic acid
- Frequency: ~2% of people a year

Otitis externa, also called swimmer's ear, is inflammation of the ear canal. It often presents with ear pain, swelling of the ear canal, and occasionally decreased hearing. Typically there is pain with movement of the outer ear. A high fever is typically not present except in severe cases.

Otitis externa may be acute (lasting less than six weeks) or chronic (lasting more than three months). Acute cases are typically due to bacterial infection, and chronic cases are often due to allergies and autoimmune disorders. The most common cause of otitis externa is bacterial. Risk factors for acute cases include swimming, minor trauma from cleaning, using hearing aids and ear plugs, and other skin problems, such as psoriasis and dermatitis. People with diabetes are at risk of a severe form of malignant otitis externa. Diagnosis is based on the signs and symptoms. Culturing the ear canal may be useful in chronic or severe cases.

Acetic acid ear drops may be used as a preventive measure. Treatment of acute cases is typically with antibiotic drops, such as ofloxacin or acetic acid. Steroid drops may be used in addition to antibiotics. Pain medications such as ibuprofen may be used for the pain. Antibiotics by mouth are not recommended unless the person has poor immune function or there is infection of the skin around the ear. Typically, improvement occurs within a day of the start of treatment. Treatment of chronic cases depends on the cause.

Otitis externa affects 1–3% of people a year; more than 95% of cases are acute. About 10% of people are affected at some point in their lives. It occurs most commonly among children between the ages of seven and twelve and among the elderly. It occurs with near equal frequency in males and females. Those who live in warm and wet climates are more often affected.

== Signs and symptoms ==
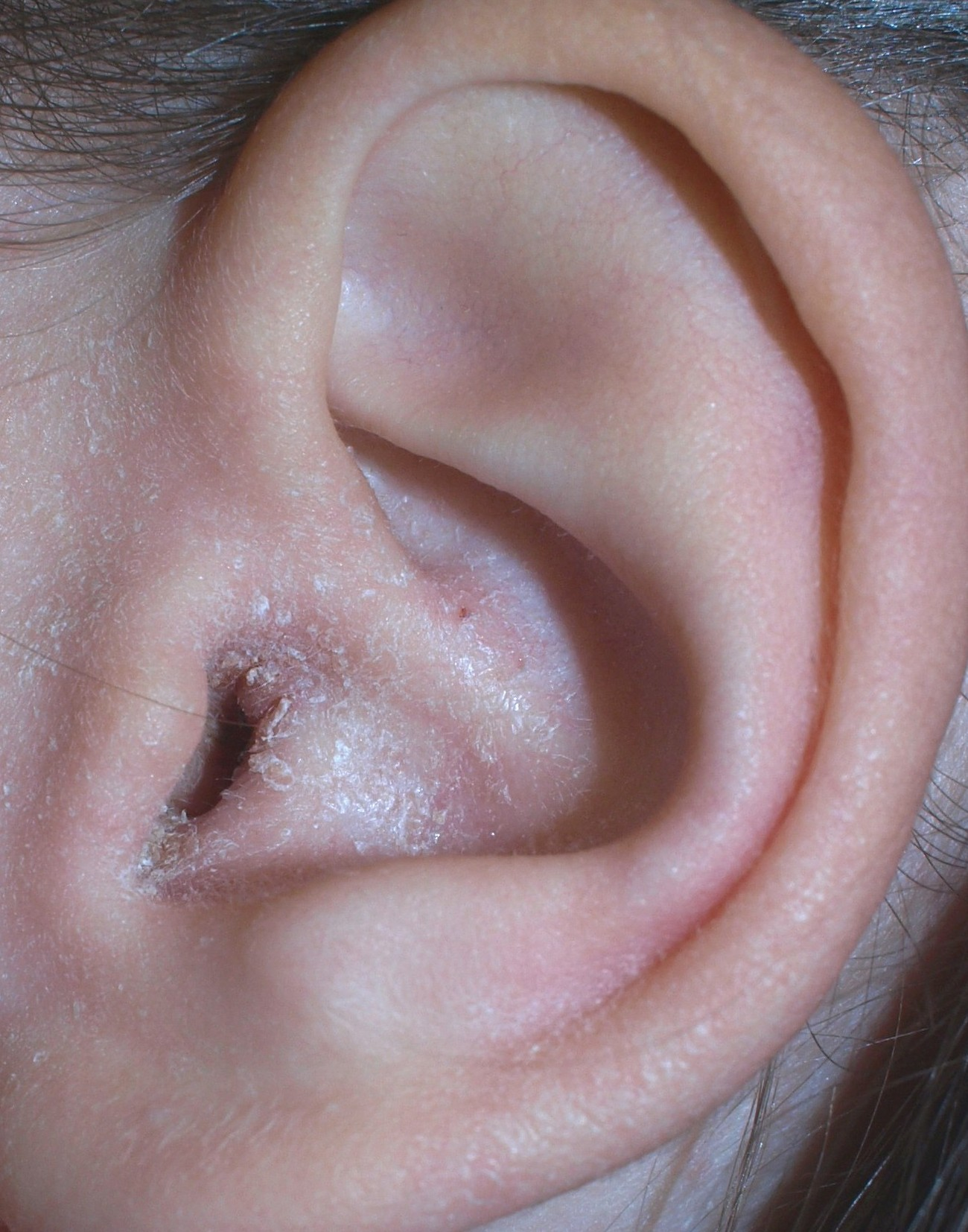
A mild case of otitis externa.

A severe case of acute otitis externa. Note the narrowing of the ear channel, the large amounts of exudate, and swelling of the outer ear.

Tenderness of pinna is the predominant complaint and the only symptom directly related to the severity of acute external otitis. Unlike other forms of ear infections, there is tenderness in outer ear, i.e., the pain of acute external otitis is worsened when the outer ear is touched or pulled gently. Pushing the tragus, the tablike portion of the auricle that projects out just in front of the ear canal opening, also typically causes pain in this condition as to be diagnostic of external otitis on physical examination. People may also experience ear discharge and itchiness. When enough swelling and discharge in the ear canal is present to block the opening, external otitis may cause temporary conductive hearing loss.

Because the symptoms of external otitis lead many people to attempt to clean out the ear canal (or scratch it) with slim implements, self-cleaning attempts generally lead to additional traumas of the injured skin, so rapid worsening of the condition often occurs.

== Causes ==
The two factors that are required for external otitis to develop are (1) the presence of germs that can infect the skin and (2) impairments in the integrity of the skin of the ear canal that allow an infection to occur. If the skin is healthy and uninjured, only exposure to a high concentration of pathogens, such as submersion in a pond contaminated by sewage, is likely to set off an episode. However, if there are chronic skin conditions that affect the ear canal skin, such as atopic dermatitis, seborrheic dermatitis, psoriasis or abnormalities of keratin production, or if there has been a break in the skin from trauma, even the normal bacteria found in the ear canal may cause infection and full-blown symptoms of external otitis.

Fungal ear canal infections, also known as otomycosis, range from inconsequential to extremely severe. Fungi can be saprophytic, in which there are no symptoms and the fungus simply co-exists in the ear canal in a commensal relationship with the host, in which case the only physical finding is the presence of a fungus. If the fungus begins active reproduction, the ear canal can fill with dense fungal debris, causing pressure and ever-increasing pain that is unrelenting until the fungus is removed from the canal and anti-fungal medication is used. Most antibacterial ear drops also contain a steroid to hasten resolution of canal edema and pain. Unfortunately, such drops make the fungal infection worse. Prolonged use of them promotes the growth of fungus in the ear canal. Antibacterial ear drops should be used for a maximum of one week, but 5 days is usually enough. Otomycosis responds more than 95% of the time to a three-day course of the same over-the-counter anti-fungal solutions used for athlete's foot.

=== Swimming ===
Swimming in polluted water is a common way to contract swimmer's ear, but it is also possible to contract swimmer's ear from water trapped in the ear canal after a shower, especially in a humid climate. Prolonged swimming can saturate the skin of the canal, compromising its barrier function and making it more susceptible to further damage if the ear is instrumented with cotton swabs after swimming. Main symptoms of swimmer’s ear are a feeling of fullness in the ear, itchiness, redness, and swelling in or around the ear canal, muffled hearing, pain in the external ear and ear canal and especially a smelly discharge from the ear.

Constriction of the ear canal from bone growth (Surfer's ear) can trap debris leading to infection. Saturation divers have reported otitis externa during occupational exposure.

=== Objects in ear ===
Even without exposure to water, the use of objects such as cotton swabs or other small objects to clear the ear canal is enough to cause breaks in the skin, and allow the condition to develop. Once the skin of the ear canal is inflamed, otitis externa can be drastically worsened by either scratching the ear canal with an object or by allowing water to remain in the ear canal for any prolonged length of time.

=== Infections ===
The majority of cases are due to Pseudomonas aeruginosa and Staphylococcus aureus, followed by a great number of other gram-positive and gram-negative species. Candida albicans and Aspergillus species are the most common fungal pathogens responsible for the condition.

== Diagnosis ==
When the ear is inspected, the canal appears red and swollen in well-developed cases. The ear canal may also appear eczema-like, with scaly shedding of skin. Touching or moving the outer ear increases the pain, and this maneuver on physical exam is important in establishing the clinical diagnosis. It may be difficult to see the eardrum with an otoscope at the initial examination because of narrowing of the ear canal from inflammation and the presence of drainage and debris. Sometimes the diagnosis of external otitis is presumptive and return visits are required to fully examine the ear. The culture of the drainage may identify the bacteria or fungus causing infection, but is not part of the routine diagnostic evaluation. In severe cases of external otitis, there may be swelling of the lymph node(s) directly beneath the ear.

The diagnosis may be missed in most early cases because the examination of the ear, with the exception of pain with manipulation, is nearly normal. In some early cases, the most striking visual finding is the lack of earwax. As a moderate or severe case of external otitis resolves, weeks may be required before the ear canal again shows a normal amount of it.

=== Classification ===
In contrast to the chronic otitis externa, acute otitis externa (AOE) is predominantly a bacterial infection, occurs suddenly, rapidly worsens, and becomes painful. The ear canal has an abundant nerve supply, so the pain is often severe enough to interfere with sleep. Wax in the ear can combine with the swelling of the canal skin and the associated pus to block the canal and dampen hearing, creating a temporary conductive hearing loss. In more severe or untreated cases, the infection can spread to the soft tissues of the face that surround the adjacent parotid gland and the jaw joint, making chewing painful. In its mildest forms, otitis externa is so common that some ear nose and throat physicians have suggested that most people will have at least a brief episode at some point in life.

The skin of the bony ear canal is unique, in that it is not movable but is closely attached to the bone, and it is almost paper-thin. For these reasons, it is easily abraded or torn by even minimal physical force. Inflammation of the ear canal skin typically begins with a physical insult, most often from injury caused by attempts at self-cleaning or scratching with cotton swabs, pen caps, fingernails, hair pins, keys, or other small implements. Another causative factor for acute infection is prolonged water exposure in the forms of swimming or exposure to extreme humidity, which can compromise the protective barrier function of the canal skin, allowing bacteria to flourish, hence the name "swimmer's ear".

== Prevention ==
The strategies for preventing acute external otitis are similar to those for treatment.

- Avoid inserting anything into the ear canal: use of cotton buds or swabs is the most common event leading to acute otitis externa. Most normal ear canals have a self-cleaning and self-drying mechanism, the latter by simple evaporation.
- After prolonged swimming, a person prone to external otitis can dry the ears using a small battery-powered ear dryer, available at many retailers, especially shops catering to watersports enthusiasts. Alternatively, drops containing dilute acetic acid (vinegar diluted 3:1) or Burow's solution may be used. It is especially important not to instrument ears when the skin is saturated with water, as it is very susceptible to injury, which can lead to external otitis.
- Avoid swimming in polluted water.
- Avoid washing hair or swimming if very mild symptoms of acute external otitis begin.
- Although the use of earplugs when swimming and shampooing hair may help prevent external otitis, there are important details in the use of plugs. Hard and poorly fitting earplugs can scratch the ear canal skin and set off an episode. When earplugs are used during an acute episode, either disposable plugs are recommended, or used plugs must be cleaned and dried properly to avoid contaminating the healing ear canal with infected discharge.

According to one source, the use of in-ear headphones during otherwise "dry" exercise in the summer has been associated with the development of swimmer's ear since the plugs can create a warm and moist environment inside the ears. The source claims that on-ear or over-ear headphones can be a better alternative for preventing swimmer's ear.

== Treatment ==
=== Medications ===
Effective solutions for the ear canal include acidifying and drying agents, used either singly or in combination. When the ear canal skin is inflamed from the acute otitis externa, the use of dilute acetic acid may be painful.

Burow's solution is a very effective remedy against both bacterial and fungal external otitis. This is a buffered mixture of aluminium sulfate and acetic acid, and is available without prescription in the United States.

Ear drops are the mainstay of treatment for external otitis. Some contain antibiotics, either antibacterial or antifungal, and others are simply designed to mildly acidify the ear canal environment to discourage bacterial growth. Some prescription drops also contain anti-inflammatory steroids, which help to resolve swelling and itching. Although there is evidence that steroids are effective at reducing the length of treatment time required, fungal otitis externa (also called otomycosis) may be caused or aggravated by overly prolonged use of steroid-containing drops.

Antibiotics by mouth should not be used to treat uncomplicated acute otitis externa. Antibiotics by mouth are not a sufficient response to bacteria which cause this condition and have significant side effects including increased risk of opportunistic infection. In contrast, topical products can treat this condition. Oral anti-pseudomonal antibiotics can be used in case of severe soft tissue swelling extending into the face and neck and may hasten recovery.

Although the acute external otitis generally resolves in a few days with topical washes and antibiotics, complete return of hearing and cerumen gland function may take a few more days. Once healed completely, the ear canal is again self-cleaning. Until it recovers fully, it may be more prone to repeat infection from further physical or chemical insult.

Effective medications include ear drops containing antibiotics to fight infection, and corticosteroids (Hydrocortisone +Neomycin+ Polymixin B) to reduce itching and inflammation. In painful cases, a topical solution of antibiotics such as aminoglycoside, polymyxin or fluoroquinolone is usually prescribed. Antifungal solutions are used in the case of fungal infections. External otitis is almost always predominantly bacterial or predominantly fungal so that only one type of medication is necessary and indicated.

=== Cleaning ===
Removal of debris (wax, shed skin, and pus) from the ear canal promotes direct contact of the prescribed medication with the infected skin and shortens recovery time. When canal swelling has progressed to the point where the ear canal is blocked, ear drops may not penetrate far enough into the ear canal to be effective. The physician may need to carefully insert a wick of cotton or other commercially available, pre-fashioned, absorbent material called an ear wick and then saturate that with the medication. The wick is kept saturated with medication until the canal opens enough that the drops will penetrate the canal without it. Removal of the wick does not require a health professional. Antibiotic ear drops should be dosed in a quantity that allows coating of most of the ear canal and used for no more than 4 to 7 days. The ear should be left open. It is imperative that visualization of an intact tympanic membrane (eardrum) is noted. Use of certain medications with a ruptured tympanic membrane can cause tinnitus, vertigo, dizziness and hearing loss in some cases.

== Prognosis ==
Otitis externa responds well to treatment, but complications may occur if it is not treated. Individuals with underlying diabetes, disorders of the immune system, or history of radiation therapy to the base of the skull are more likely to develop complications, including malignant otitis externa. In these individuals, rapid examination by an otolaryngologist (ear, nose, and throat physician) is very important.

- Chronic otitis externa
- Spread of infection to other areas of the body
- Necrotizing external otitis
- Otitis externa haemorhagica

=== Necrotizing external otitis ===
Necrotizing external otitis (malignant otitis externa) is an uncommon form of external otitis that occurs mainly in elderly diabetics, being somewhat more likely and more severe when the diabetes is poorly controlled. Even less commonly, it can develop due to a severely compromised immune system. Beginning as infection of the external ear canal, there is an extension of the infection into the bony ear canal and the soft tissues deep to the bony canal. Unrecognized and untreated, it may result in death. The hallmark of malignant otitis externa (MOE) is unrelenting pain that interferes with sleep and persists even after swelling of the external ear canal may have resolved with topical antibiotic treatment. It can also cause skull base osteomyelitis (SBO), manifested by multiple cranial nerve palsies, described below under the "Treatment" heading.

==== Natural history ====
MOE follows a much more chronic and indolent course than ordinary acute otitis externa. There may be granulation involving the floor of the external ear canal, most often at the bony-cartilaginous junction. Paradoxically, the physical findings of MOE, at least in its early stages, are often much less dramatic than those of ordinary acute otitis externa. In later stages, there can be soft tissue swelling around the ear, even in the absence of significant canal swelling. While fever and leukocytosis might be expected in response to bacterial infection invading the skull region, MOE does not cause fever or elevation of white blood count.

==== Treatment of MOE ====
Unlike ordinary otitis externa, MOE requires oral or intravenous antibiotics for cure. Pseudomonas is the most common offending pathogen. Diabetes control is also an essential part of treatment. When MOE goes unrecognized and untreated, the infection continues to smolder and over weeks or months can spread deeper into the head and involve the bones of the skull base, constituting skull base osteomyelitis (SBO). Multiple cranial nerve palsies can result, including the facial nerve (causing facial palsy), the recurrent laryngeal nerve (causing vocal cord paralysis), and the cochlear nerve (causing deafness).

The infecting organism is almost always pseudomonas aeruginosa, but it can instead be fungal (aspergillus or mucor). MOE and SBO are not amenable to surgery, but exploratory surgery may facilitate the culture of unusual organism(s) that are not responding to empirically used anti-pseudomonal antibiotics (ciprofloxacin being the drug of choice). The usual surgical finding is diffuse cellulitis without localized abscess formation. SBO can extend into the petrous apex of the temporal bone or more inferiorly into the opposite side of the skull base.

The use of hyperbaric oxygen therapy as an adjunct to antibiotic therapy remains controversial.

==== Complications ====
As the skull base is progressively involved, the adjacent exiting cranial nerves and their branches, especially the facial nerve and the vagus nerve, may be affected, resulting in facial paralysis and hoarseness, respectively. If both of the recurrent laryngeal nerves are paralyzed, shortness of breath may develop and necessitate tracheotomy. Profound deafness can occur, usually later in the disease course due to relative resistance of the inner ear structures. Gallium scans are sometimes used to document the extent of the infection but are not essential to disease management. Skull base osteomyelitis is a chronic disease that can require months of IV antibiotic treatment, tends to recur, and has a significant mortality rate.

== Epidemiology ==
The incidence of otitis externa is high. In the Netherlands, it has been estimated at 12–14 per 1000 population per year, and has been shown to affect more than 1% of a sample of the population in the United Kingdom over a 12-month period.

== History ==
During the Tektite Project in 1969 there was a great deal of otitis externa. The Diving Medical Officer devised a prophylaxis that came to be known as, "Tektite Solution", equal parts of 15% tannic acid, 15% acetic acid and 50% isopropyl alcohol or ethanol. During Tektite ethanol was used because it was available in the lab for pickling specimens.
