= Otoscope =

Medical device for examining the ears

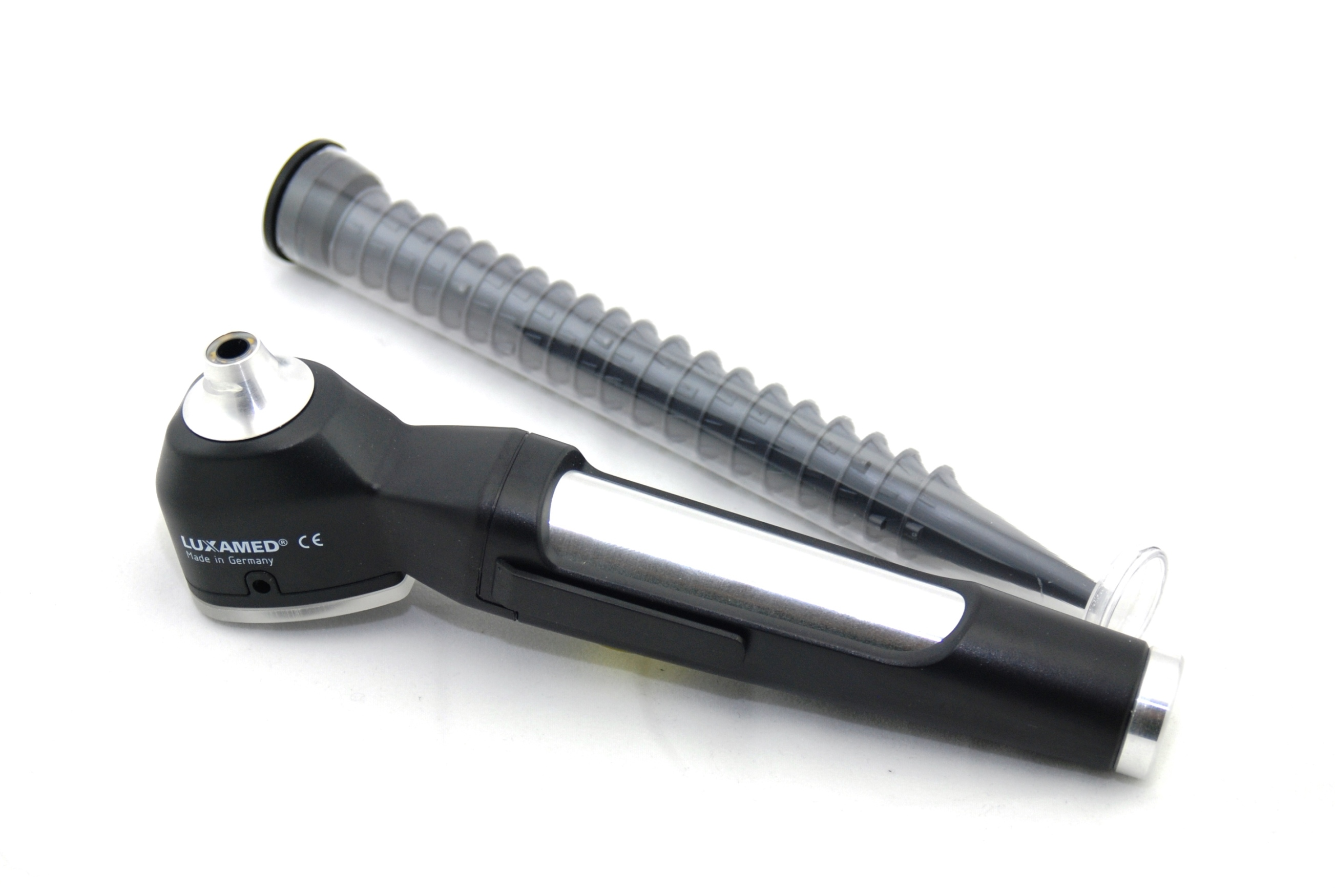
- An otoscope, with a tube of disposable tips behind
- Synonyms: auriscope
- Specialty: Otorhinolaryngology
- [edit on Wikidata]

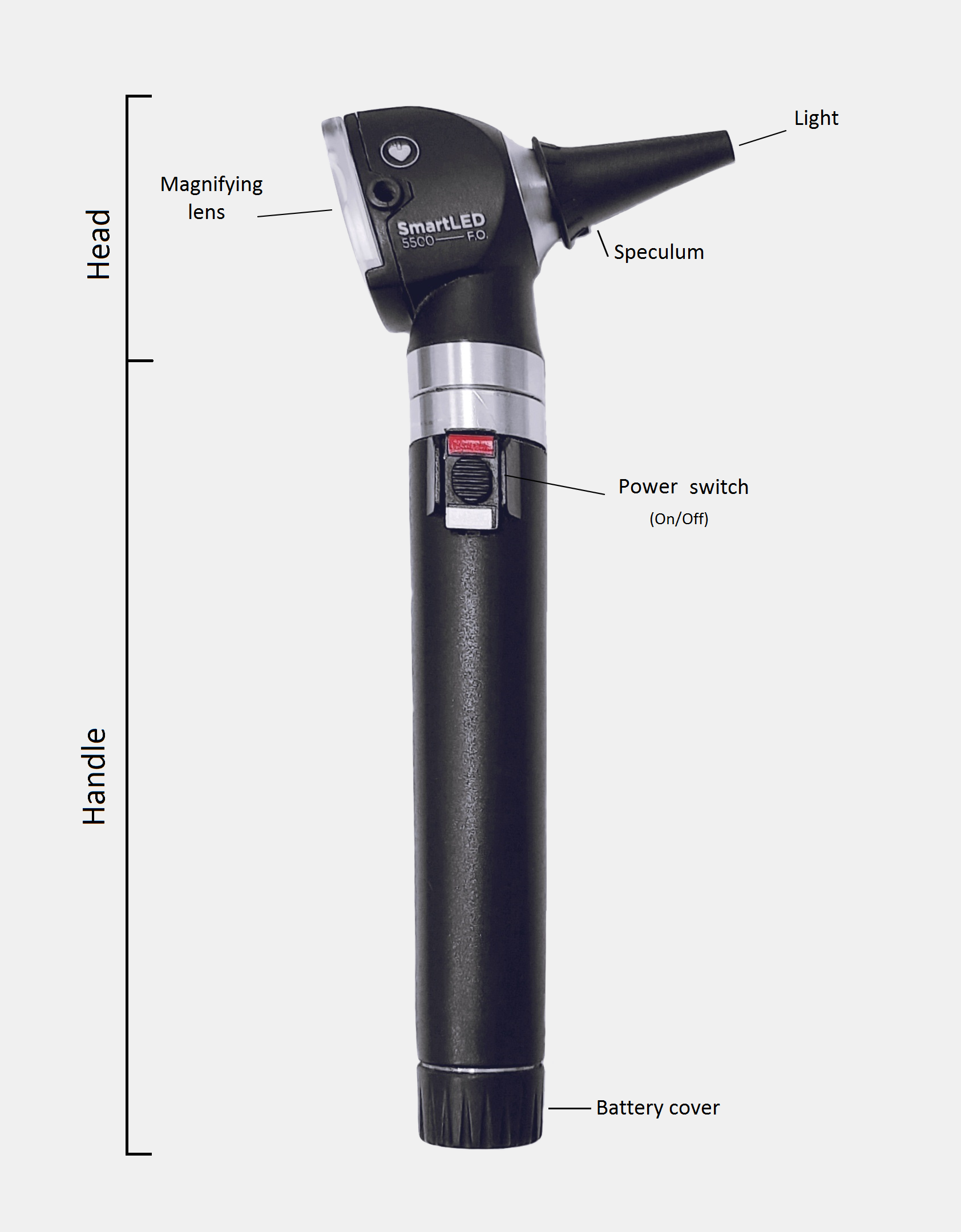
Components of an otoscope

Anatomy of the human ear

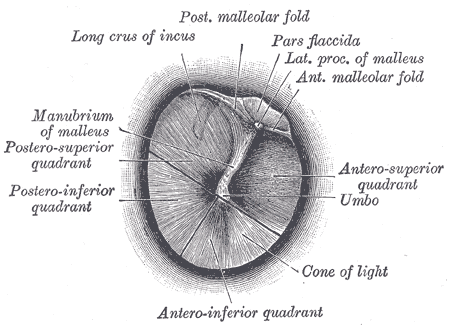
Right tympanic membrane as seen through a speculum

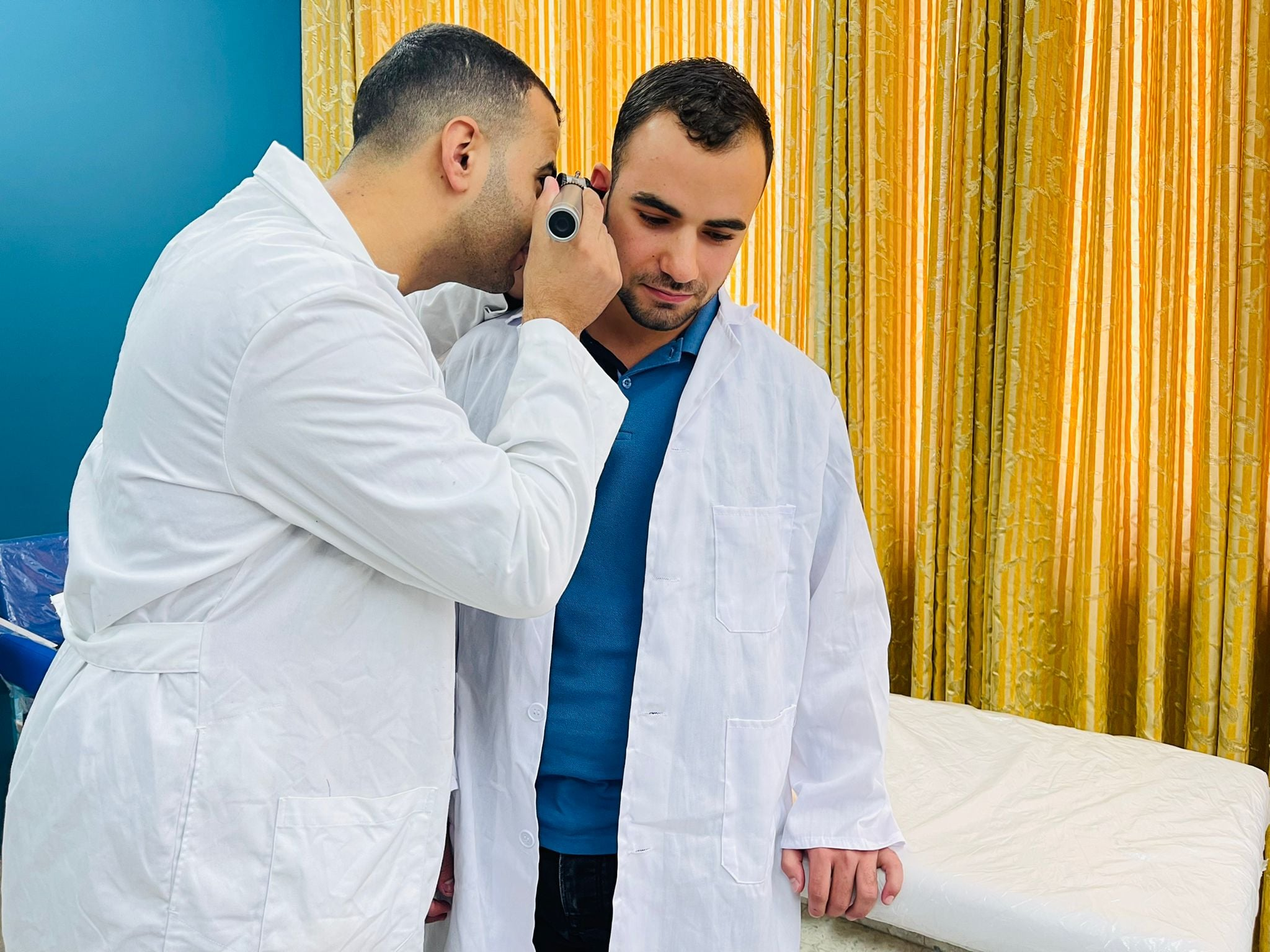
A doctor performs an otoscopy examination.

An otoscope or auriscope is a medical device used by healthcare professionals to examine the ear canal and eardrum. This may be done as part of routine physical examinations, or for evaluating specific ear complaints, such as earaches, sense of fullness in the ear, or hearing loss.

== Usage ==
=== Function ===
An otoscope enables viewing and examination of the ear canal and tympanic membrane (eardrum). As the eardrum is the border between the external ear canal and the middle ear, its characteristics can indicate various diseases of the middle ear space. Otoscopic examination can help diagnose conditions such as acute otitis media (infection of the middle ear), otitis externa (infection of the outer ear), traumatic perforation of the eardrum, and cholesteatoma.

The presence of cerumen (earwax), shed skin, pus, canal skin edema, foreign bodies, and various ear diseases, can obscure the view of the eardrum and thus compromise the value of otoscopy done with a common otoscope, but can confirm the presence of obstructing symptoms.

Otoscopes can also be used to examine patients' noses (avoiding the need for a separate nasal speculum) and upper throats (by removing the speculum).

=== Method of use ===
The most common otoscopes consist of a handle and a head. The head contains a light source and a magnifying lens, typically around 8 diopters (3× magnification), to help illuminate and enlarge ear structures. The distal (front) end of the otoscope has an attachment for disposable plastic ear specula.

The examiner first pulls on the pinna (usually the earlobe, side or top) to straighten the ear canal, and then inserts the ear speculum side of the otoscope into the outer ear. It is important to brace the index or little finger of the hand holding the otoscope against the patient's head to avoid injuring the ear canal. The examiner then looks through the lens on the rear of the instrument to see inside the ear canal.

In many models, the examiner can remove the lens and insert instruments like specialized suction tips through the otoscope into the ear canal, such as for removing earwax. Most models also have an insertion point for a bulb that pushes air through the speculum (pneumatic otoscopy) for testing eardrum mobility.

== Types ==
Many otoscopes for doctors' offices are wall-mounted, with an electrical cord providing power from an electric outlet. Portable otoscopes powered by batteries (usually rechargeable) in the handle are also available.

Otoscopes are often sold with ophthalmoscopes as a diagnostic set.

=== Monocular and binocular ===
Most otoscopes used in emergency rooms, pediatric offices, general practice, and by internists are monocular devices. These provide a two-dimensional view of the ear canal and its contents, and usually at least a portion of the eardrum.

Another method of performing otoscopy (visualization of the ear) is by using a binocular (two-eyed) microscope in conjunction with a larger plastic or metal ear speculum, which provides a much larger field of view. The microscope is suspended from a stand, which frees up both of the examiner's hands; the patient is placed in a supine position and their head is tilted, which keeps the head stable and enables better lighting. The binocular view enables depth perception, which makes removal of earwax or other obstructing materials easier and less hazardous. The microscope also has up to 40× magnification, allowing more detailed viewing of the entire ear canal, and of the entire eardrum (unless prevented by edema of the canal skin). Subtle changes in the anatomy can also be more easily detected and interpreted.

Traditionally, binocular microscopes are only used by otolaryngologists (ear, nose, and throat specialists) and otologists (subspecialty ear doctors). Their widespread adoption in general medicine is hindered by cost and lack of familiarity among pediatric and general medicine professors in physician training programs. Studies have shown that reliance on a monocular otoscope to diagnose ear disease results in a more than 50% chance of misdiagnosis, as compared to binocular microscopic otoscopy.

=== Pneumatic otoscope ===
The pneumatic otoscope is used to examine the eardrum for assessing the health of the middle ear. This is done by assessing the eardrum's contour (normal, retracted, full, or bulging), its color (gray, yellow, pink, amber, white, red, or blue), its translucency (translucent, semi-opaque, opaque), and its mobility (normal, increased, decreased, or absent). The pneumatic otoscope is the standard tool used in diagnosing otitis media (infection of the middle ear).

The pneumatic otoscope has a pneumatic (diagnostic) head, which contains a lens, an enclosed light source, and a nipple for attaching a rubber bulb and tubing. By gently squeezing and releasing the bulb in rapid succession, the degree of eardrum mobility in response to positive and negative pressure can be observed. The head is designed so that an airtight chamber is produced when a speculum is attached and fitted snugly into the patient's ear canal. Using a rubber-tipped speculum or adding a small sleeve of rubber tubing at the end of a plastic speculum, can help improve the airtight seal and also help avoid injuring the patient.

By replacing the pneumatic head with a surgical head, the pneumatic otoscope can also be used to clear earwax from the ear canal, and to perform diagnostic tympanocentesis (drainage of fluid from the middle ear) or myringotomy (creation of incision in the eardrum). The surgical head consists of an unenclosed light source and a lens that can swivel over a wide arc.

== See also ==
- Head mirror – Diagnostic device
- Intraoral camera
