= Calculus (concretion) =

Solid mineral mass which forms in a bodily organ or duct

- Other names: Stone
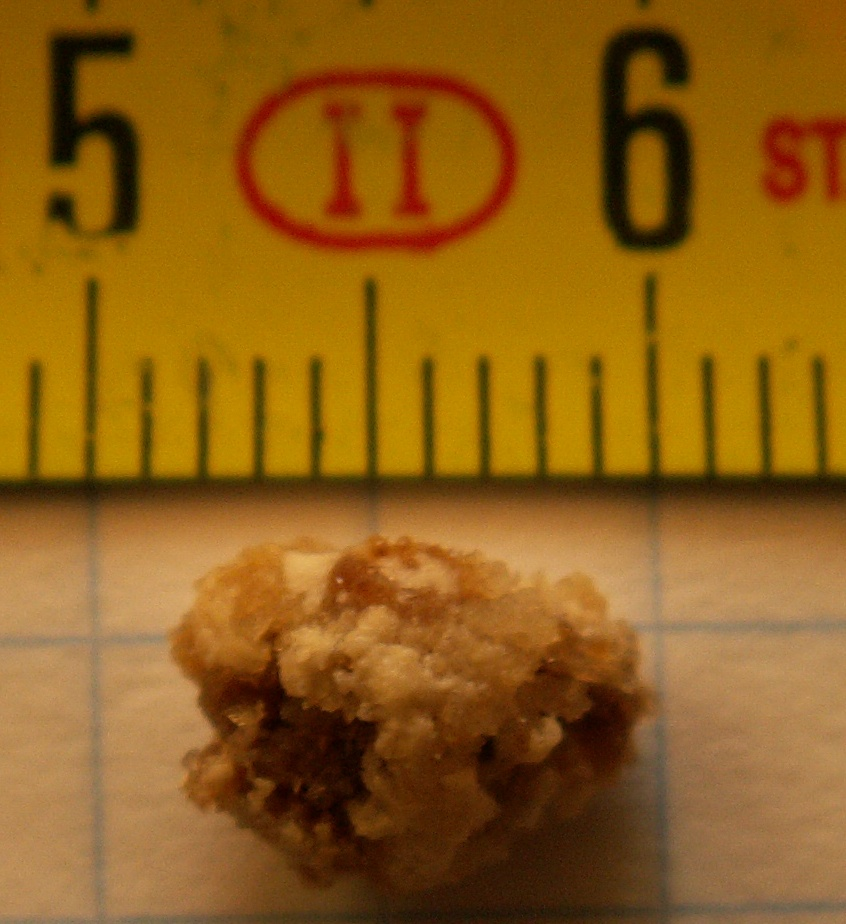
- An 8-mm kidney stone
- Symptoms: Pain
- Complications: Inflammation
- Prevention: Diet
- Treatment: Drinking water, surgery

A calculus (pl.: calculi), often called a stone, is a concretion of material, usually mineral salts, that forms in an organ or duct of the body. Formation of calculi is known as lithiasis (/ˌlɪˈθaɪəsɪs/). Stones can cause a number of medical conditions.

Some common principles (below) apply to stones at any location, but for specifics see the particular stone type in question.

Calculi are not to be confused with gastroliths, which are ingested rather than grown endogenously.

== Types ==
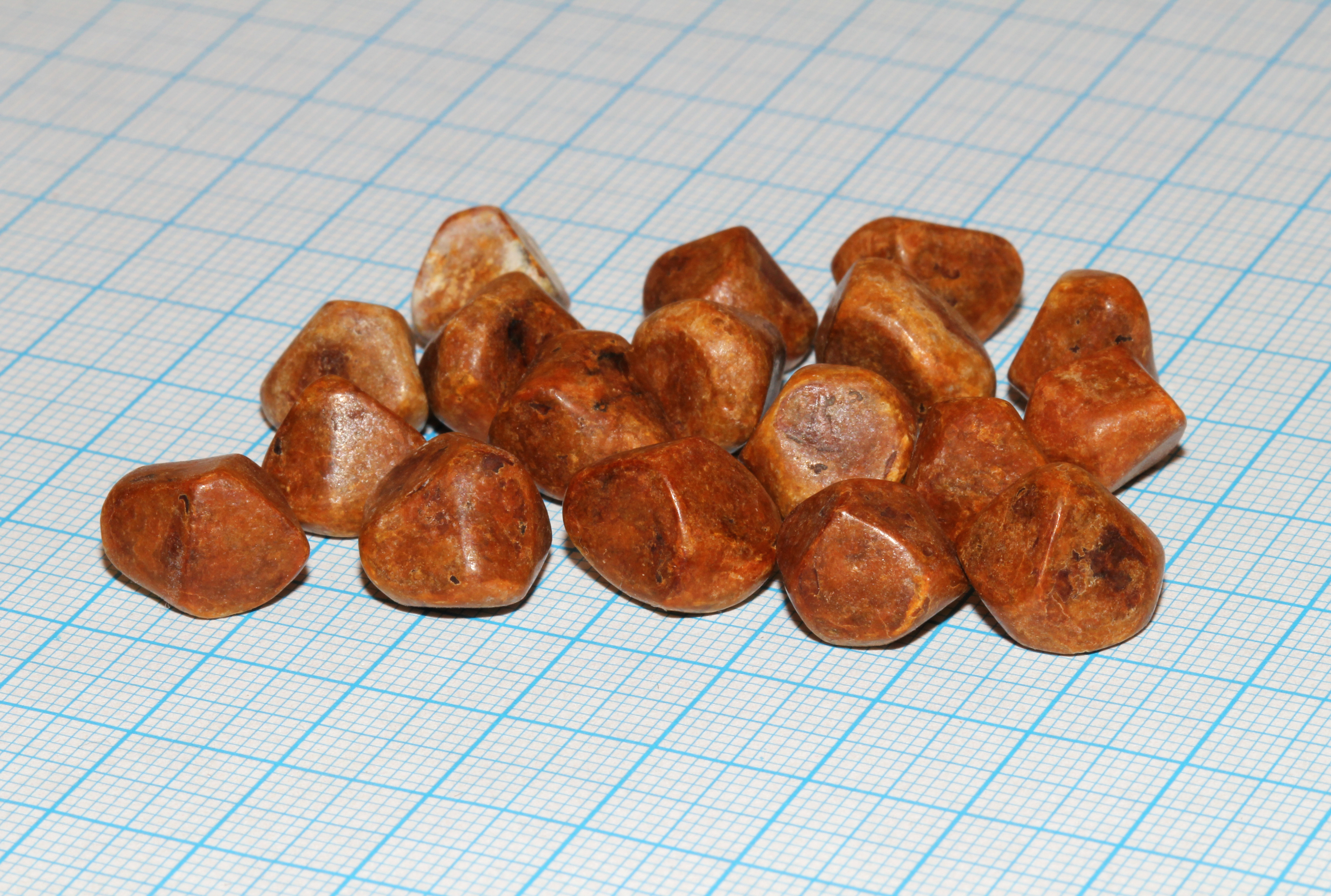
Human gallstones, all removed from one patient. Grid scale 1 mm.

- Calculi in the inner ear are called otoliths. Unlike other entries in this list, otoliths are not pathological but are a normal feature of the inner ear.
- Calculi in the urinary system are called urinary calculi and include kidney stones (also called renal calculi or nephroliths) and bladder stones (also called vesical calculi or cystoliths). They can have any of several compositions, including mixed. Principal compositions include oxalate and urate.
- Calculi in the prostate are called prostatic calculi.
- Calculi in the mammary gland are called breast microcalcifications or mammary microcalcifications.
- Calculi of the gallbladder and bile ducts are called gallstones and are primarily developed from bile salts and cholesterol derivatives.
- Calculi in the nasal passages (rhinoliths) are rare.
- Calculi in the gastrointestinal tract (enteroliths) can be enormous. Individual enteroliths weighing many pounds have been reported in horses.
- Calculi in the stomach are called gastric calculi (not to be confused with gastroliths which are exogenous in nature).
- Calculi in the salivary glands are called salivary calculi (sialoliths).
- Calculi in the tonsils are called tonsillar calculi (tonsilloliths).
- Calculi in the veins are called venous calculi (phleboliths).
- Calculi in the skin, such as in sweat glands, are not common but occasionally occur.
- Calculi in the navel are called omphaloliths.

Most calculi are asymptomatic. Large calculi may have required many years to form.

== Cause ==
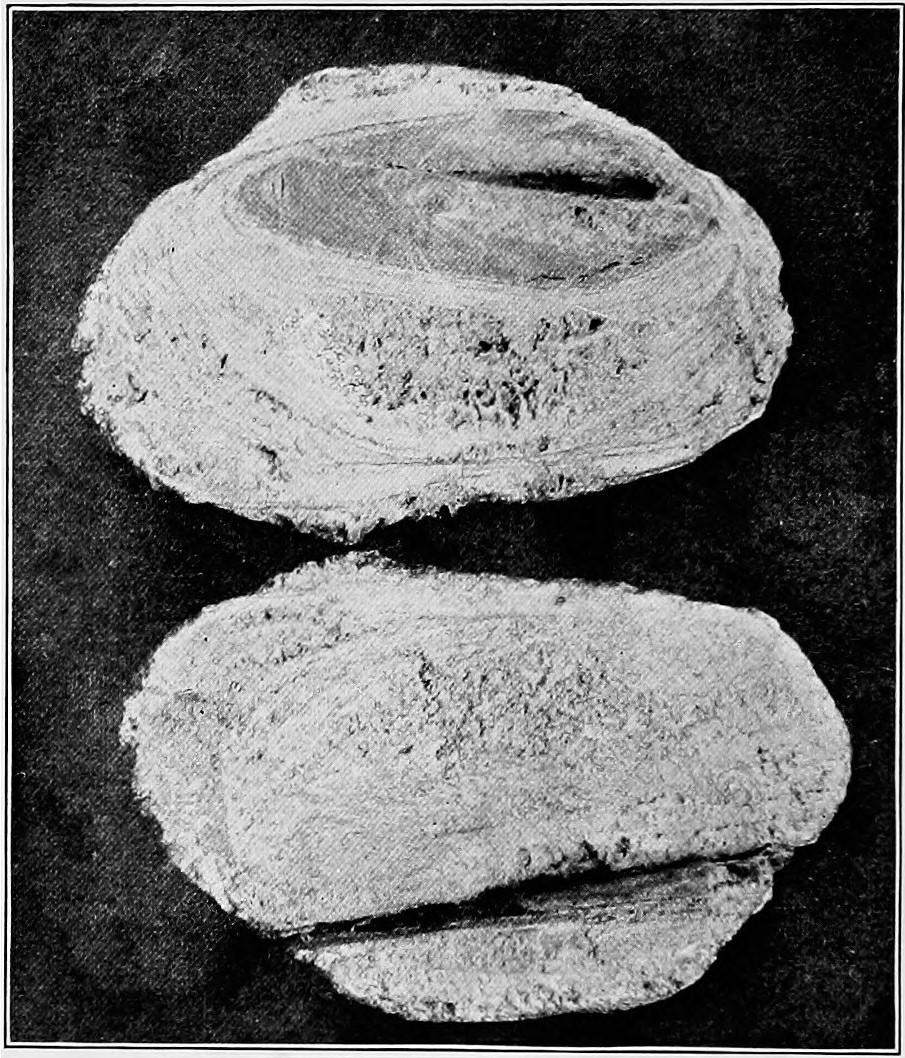
Calculus developed from an arrowhead

- From an underlying abnormal excess of the mineral, e.g., with elevated levels of calcium (hypercalcaemia) that may cause kidney stones, dietary factors for gallstones.
- Local conditions at the site in question that promote their formation, e.g., local bacteria action (in kidney stones) or slower fluid flow rates, a possible explanation of the majority of salivary duct calculus occurring in the submandibular salivary gland.
- Enteroliths are a type of calculus found in the intestines of animals (mostly ruminants) and humans, and may be composed of inorganic or organic constituents.
- Bezoars are lumps of indigestible material in the stomach and/or intestines; most commonly, they consist of hair (in which case they are also known as hairballs). A bezoar may form the nidus of an enterolith.

In kidney stones, calcium oxalate is the most common mineral type (see nephrolithiasis). Uric acid is the second most common mineral type, but an in vitro study showed uric acid stones and crystals can promote the formation of calcium oxalate stones.

== Pathophysiology ==
Stones can cause disease by several mechanisms:

- Irritation of nearby tissues, causing pain, swelling, and inflammation
- Obstruction of an opening or duct, interfering with normal flow and disrupting the function of the organ in question
- Predisposition to infection (often due to disruption of normal flow)

A number of important medical conditions are caused by stones:

- Nephrolithiasis (kidney stones)
  - Can cause hydronephrosis (swollen kidneys) and kidney failure
  - Can predispose to pyelonephritis (kidney infections)
  - Can progress to urolithiasis
- Urolithiasis (urinary bladder stones)
  - Can progress to bladder outlet obstruction
- Cholelithiasis (gallstones)
  - Can predispose to cholecystitis (gall bladder infections) and ascending cholangitis (biliary tree infection)
  - Can progress to choledocholithiasis (gallstones in the bile duct) and gallstone pancreatitis (inflammation of the pancreas)
- Gastric calculi can cause colic, obstruction, torsion, and necrosis.

== Diagnosis ==
Diagnostic workup varies by the stone type, but in general:

- Clinical history and physical examination
- Imaging studies:
  - Some stone types (mainly those with substantial calcium content) can be detected on X-ray and CT scan
  - Many stone types can be detected by ultrasound
- Factors contributing to stone formation (as in #Etiology) are often tested:
  - Laboratory testing can give levels of relevant substances in blood or urine
  - Some stones can be directly recovered (at surgery, or when they leave the body spontaneously) and sent to a laboratory for analysis of content

== Treatment ==
Modification of predisposing factors can sometimes slow or reverse stone formation. Treatment varies by stone type, but, in general:

- Healthy diet and exercise (promotes flow of energy and nutrition)
- Drinking fluids (water and electrolytes like lemon juice, diluted vinegar e.g. in pickles, salad dressings, sauces, soups, shrubs cocktail)
- Surgery (lithotomy)
- Medication / antibiotics
- Extracorporeal shock wave lithotripsy (ESWL) for removal of calculi

== History ==
The earliest operation for curing stones is given in the Sushruta Samhita (6th century BCE). The operation involved exposure and going up through the floor of the bladder.

The care of this disease was forbidden to the physicians that had taken the Hippocratic Oath because:

- There was a high probability of intraoperative and postoperative surgical complications such as infection or bleeding.
- Physicians would not perform surgery, as in ancient cultures surgery was a separate profession.

== Etymology ==
The word comes from Latin calculus "small stone", from calx "limestone, lime", probably related to Greek χάλιξ chalix "small stone, pebble, rubble", which many trace to a Proto-Indo-European language root for "split, break up". Calculus was a term used for various kinds of stones. In the 18th century it came to be used for accidental or incidental mineral buildups in human and animal bodies, like kidney stones and minerals on teeth.

== See also ==
- Bezoar
- Calculus (dental)
- Lithotomy
