= Rhinolith =

Solid mass which forms in the nasal cavity

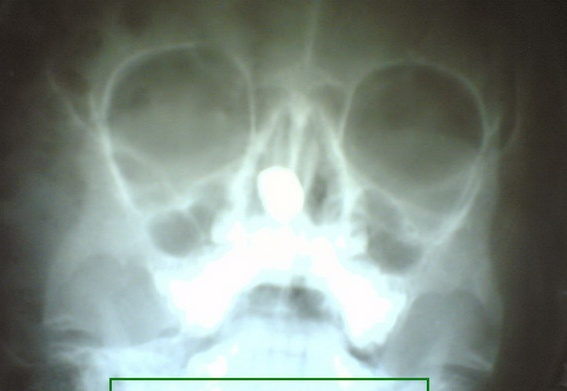
- X-ray of paranasal sinuses showing rhinolith
- Pronunciation: Rai-no-lith
- Specialty: ENT surgery
- Symptoms: Nasal blockage, Foul smelling from nose, Nasal pain, With or without headache, Epistaxis
- Causes: Calcium carbonate, Calcium phosphate, Magnesium carbonate, Magnesium Phosphate stone
- Treatment: Endoscopic Removal of Stone.

A rhinolith (from rhino- 'nose' and -lith 'stone') is a stone present in the nasal cavity. It is an uncommon medical phenomenon, not to be confused with dried nasal mucus. A rhinolith usually forms around the nucleus of a small exogenous foreign body, blood clot or secretion by slow deposition of calcium and magnesium carbonate and phosphate salts. Over time, they grow into large irregular masses that fill the nasal cavity.

They may cause pressure necrosis of the nasal septum or lateral wall of nose. Rhinoliths can cause nasal obstruction, epistaxis, headache, sinusitis and epiphora. They can be diagnosed from the history with unilateral foul-smelling blood-stained nasal discharge or by anterior rhinoscopy. On probing, the probe can be passed around all its corners. In both CT and MRI, a rhinolith will appear like a radiopaque irregular material. Small rhinoliths can be removed by a foreign body hook; large rhinoliths can be removed either by crushing with Luc's forceps or by Moore's lateral rhinotomy approach.

== Signs and symptoms ==
Rhinoliths present as a unilateral nasal obstruction. Foul-smelling, blood-stained discharge is often present. Nosebleed and pain may occur due to the ulceration of surrounding mucosa.

== See also ==
- Rhinotomy
