= Nidus =

Nidus may refer to:

- Nidus (nest), for insects or small animals
- The characteristic lesion in osteoid osteoma
- The centre of a bladder stone
- The material around which an enterolith forms
- The Nidus, a fictional magical object in the television series Into the Labyrinth
