= Eustachian =

Eustachian, meaning "discovered by, described by or attributed to Eustachi" (Latin name Eustachius) may refer to:

== Anatomy ==
- Eustachian tube, an anatomical passage that links the ears to the sinuses
- Eustachian valve, a valve of the heart

== Medicine ==
- Eustachian catheter, a medical instrument which became obsolete after the invention of politzerization.
