= Abraham Kuhn =

German otolaryngologist (1838–1900)

Abraham Kuhn (January 28, 1838 – September 15, 1900) was an Alsatian otolaryngologist born in Bissersheim, Rhineland-Palatinate.

He studied under Anton von Tröltsch (1829–1890) at the University of Würzburg, then continued his education at the École de Médecine in Strasbourg. In 1870, he published his French translation of Tröltsch's Lehrbuch der Ohrenheilkunde, with the title Traité pratique des maladies de l'oreille.

During the Franco-Prussian War he served with the Croix-Rouge (French Red Cross) on the battlefields of Wissembourg and Wörth. In 1873 he became a lecturer at the renamed Kaiser-Wilhelm-Universität in Strassburg, where in 1881 he was appointed associate professor of otolaryngology and director of the clinic of ear diseases. After his death, he was succeeded at Strassburg by Paul Manasse.

During his career, Kuhn was one of only a handful of professors in Germany who specialized in the field of otology. Much of his scientific research dealt with comparative anatomy of the ear, in particular the labyrinth of the inner ear. He also made significant contributions on the diagnosis and treatment of ear tumors.

== Selected writings ==
- Traité pratique des maladies de l'oreille (Paris 1870), translation with D.M. Levi of Anton Friedrich von Tröltsch's Lehrbuch der Ohrenheilkunde.
- Histologie des Häutigen Labyrinthes der Knochenfische (Leipzig 1878).
- Neubildungen des Ohres und Vergleichende Anatomie des Ohres in: Hermann Schwartze's "Handbuch für Ohrenheilkunde" (Leipzig 1893).

== Bibliography ==
- Wininger, Salomon (1928). "Kuhn, Abraham". Große Jüdische National-Biographie (in German). Vol. 3.
- Haneman, Frederick T. (1904). "Kuhn, Abraham". Jewish Encyclopedia. Vol. 7. p. 581.
