= List of instruments used in otorhinolaryngology, head and neck surgery =

Instruments used specially in Otolaryngology (Otorhinolaryngology, head and neck surgery) i.e. ENT are as follows:

== Instrument list ==
Instrument	Uses
Head Mirror with head band	to focus light into the cavity under inspection; mirror is concave and is used with a Chiron lamp to produce a parallel beam of light; doctor views through the hole (average diameter of mirror is 90 mm & that of hole is 6 mm)
Head mounted lights with head band	to focus light into the cavity under inspection
Chiron lamp	source of light
Katz extractor	to remove nasal foreign body
Bull's eye lamp	source of light; exiting lens is convex and produces a divergent beam of light
Speculum	to dilate orifices and to see inside
•Thudichum's nasal speculum	-do-; short blades (uses: anterior rhinoscopy - to see the Little's area, ant-inferior part of nasal septum, anterior part of inferior and middle turbinate and meatus, as well as any pathological lesion in the area; also used in certain nasal operations )
•St. Clair Thompson's long bladed nasal speculum	-do-; long blades (uses: in operations such as Submucous Resection of the nasal septum )
•Killian's long bladed nasal speculum	-do-; long blades and with handles; used more operations like SMR & Septoplasty. (advantage: blade can be adjusted and fixed with screws, to avoid strain due to holding )
•Lempert's endaural speculum	open the ear canal
•Seigle's pneumatic speculum	open the ear canal and give a magnification; test the mobility of tympanic membrane; see a magnified image of small perforations; introduce medicine into middle ear; perform Fistula test for vestibular function
•Aural/Ear speculum	to fit in and straighten the external ear canal
Lack's tongue depressor	to depress or remove the tongue or other structures from the field of inspection or to view them from all sides; examine oral cavity; posterior rhinoscopy; minor operations; foreign body removal; biopsy;peritonsillar abscess drainage; retraction of cheek and lip.
Forceps	to hold things
•Asch's septum forceps	used to work on the nasal septum
•Tilly's nasal dressing forceps	for use in the anterior part of the nasal cavity most importantly, anterior nasal packing; larger than Hartmann's, serrated tip & box joint (uses: all nasal operations; nasal packing; removal of fish bone )
•Tilly's aural dressing forceps	for use in the ear canal; larger than Hartmann's
•Hartmann's aural forceps	for use in the ear canal; smaller than Tilly's and has a better "biting" action
•Hunter Tod's forceps	for use in the ear canal
•Fagge's aural forceps	for use in the ear canal
•Waugh's long dissecting forceps	used for dissection like on the tonsils, also to catch bleeding points and putting in swabs
•Wilson's tonsil artery forceps	as a haemostat (same as Negus )
•Negus tonsil artery forceps	as a haemostat, replaces tonsil artery forceps; used to tie ligature at a depth and ligature won't slip due to its curve tip.
•Peritonsilar abscess forceps	to drain abscesses in the soft tissue adjacent to the palatine tonsils
•Denis Brown's tonsil holding forceps	to hold the tonsil during dissection
•Luc's nasal forceps	used in Caldwell-Luc operation on the maxillary sinuses
•Walsham forceps	used to work on the nasal septum
•Citelli's punch forceps	punching out holes in bones or other tissues
•Henckle's punch forceps	punching out holes in bones or other tissues
Eustachian (tube) catheter	on certain procedures of the eustachian tube or the middle ear like patency test; inflate middle ear and clear eustachian tube blockade; removal of foreign body of the nose; as a suction cannula.
Mirrors	
•Laryngeal mirror	straight mirror for indirect laryngoscopy (seeing the larynx); structure seen are the base of tongue, vallecula, glossoepiglottic fold, epiglottis, pharyngo-epiglottic folds, aryepiglottic folds, epiglottis, interarytenoid region, pyriform sinus, inlet of larynx, supraglottic region, ventricular bands, vocal cord, subglottis and few rings of trachea; used for removal of fish bone, biopsy, anaesthesia of larynx, trachea, bronchi; removal of vocal nodule and papilloma.
•Postnasal/Posterior rhinoscopy mirror (St. Clair Thompson's)	for posterior rhinoscopy (seeing the inner parts of the nose like the choanae)
Bronchoscope	hollow tube to see within the respiratory tract without obstructing respiration
Oesophagoscope	hollow tube to see within the oesophagus
Laryngoscope	used in direct laryngoscopy; video link
Jobson Horne's probe with ring curette	to access or clean the external ear
Tuning forks	for various clinical tests of hearing loss; vibration sense test
Pritchard's politzerization apparatus	video link
Aural/Ear syringe	used to flush out anything like ear wax or foreign bodies from the external ear
Toynbee's auscultation tube	
Otoscope/Auriscope	to examine the external auditory canal and ear drum; used during aural toileting, removal of wax, myringotomy, stapedectomy and to dilate the stenosis of canal
Mouth gag	-
•Doyen's mouth gag	to keep the mouth open, mostly operate the mouth
•Boyle Davis mouth gag	to keep the mouth open and depress the tongue to operate within or through the mouth; operations in which it is used: tonsillectomy, operation of palate, pharynx, nasopharynx.
•Jenning's mouth gag	-do-
Draffin's bipod metallic stand and Magauran's plate	used to hold the Boyle Davis mouth gag fitted head in a particular place.
Guillotine	used in guillotine method of tonsillectomy
Gwyenne Evans Tonsil dissector and anterior pillar retractor	used in tonsillectomy
Snares	-
•Eve's tonsil snare	to remove tonsil - used at the end to minimize bleeding
•Krause's nasal snare	used to remove nasal polyps
•Glegg's nasal polyp snare	used to remove nasal polyps
•Aural snare	used to remove aural polyps
Tonsil knife	used in tonsillectomy.incission of anterior pillar of tonsil in the beginning of operation
Yorke's tonsil haemostatic clamp	haemostatic clamps
Negus' ligature slipper/knot tier	used with Negus's or Wilson's artery forceps to help tie sutures; help to slip the ligature over the tip of Negus or Wilson forceps during ligation of vessels following tonsillectomy.
Negus' artery forceps	as a haemostat; replace tonsil artery forceps; ligature will not slip due to curve tip.
St. Clair Thompson adenoid curette with cage and guard	used in adenoid surgery.held in dagger holding fashion and passed behind soft palate.
Yankauer's nasopharyngoscope	for a direct access or look at the nasopharynx
Yankauer suction tip	double bent sucker; used as a sucker in operations of the mouth
Lichtwitz antrum-puncture trocar and canula	used in nasal sinus surgery; conform presence of puss in maxillary sinus; cytological examination of antral wash out fluid; lavage of the maxillary sinus; introduction of medication and indwelling polythene tube into the sinus
Tilly's antral harpoon trocar	to create an artificial passage into the maxillary sinus through the nose; puncture medial wall of inferior meatuses
Tilly's antral bur	to enlarge the artificial passage into the maxillary sinus through the nose made by the harpoon trochar; dilate and smoothen the antrostomy opening
Freer's double-ended mucoperichondrium elevator	separation of the mucosa from the cartilage in nasal surgery like Septomarginal resectiondisplacement of inferior turbinate
Farabuef's periosteal elevator	used in mastoid surgeries like mastoidectomy
Rose's sinus washing canula	to irrigate the maxillary sinuses
Higginson's syringe	irrigating the antrum, nasal douching for atrophic rhinitis
Ballenger's swivel knife	cutting septal cartilage; SMR operation
Nasal foreign body hook	to remove nasal foreign bodies
Electric drill	for bone drilling
Mollison's self-retaining haemostatic mastoid retractor	used in mastoid surgeries to retract overlying tissues
Staecke's guide and protector	used in mastoid surgeries
Chisel	removing parts of bones
Mastoid gouge	removing parts of mastoid bones
MacEwen's cell seeker with curette	used to curette within the mastoid
Lempert's curette or scoop	removing parts of the nasal septum
Killian's nasal bone gouge	bayonet shaped; removing parts of the nasal septum
Myringotome	used to cut the ear drum
Grommet stapedectomy set	used in surgeries of the ear drum
Tracheostomy tube	used in tracheostomy to bypass the airway above its point of insertion, due to any reason
•Fuller's bi-valve type	metal double tube; used in a new tracheostomy or during closing it for a few days
•Portex type	used in permanent tracheostomy
•Cuffed type	in unconscious patient (single cuff is sufficient); used in permanent tracheostomy (with two cuffs); has a balloon (cuff) that is inflated to occlude the airway around the tube to prevent aspiration of fluids into the lungs
•Jackson's	metal double tube and a pilot
Retractor's (single or double hook)	to retract tissues
Tracheal hooks (blunt or sharp)	used in tracheostomy
Lempert's endural retractor	used in ear surgery
•Jansen's self retaining	self retaining retractor used in mastoid surgery
•Mollison's self retaining haemostatic	self retaining retractor used in mastoid surgery
Tracheal dilator	used in tracheostomy to dilate the cut edges of the trachea
Long gauze pieces	for anterior nasal packing

== Image gallery ==
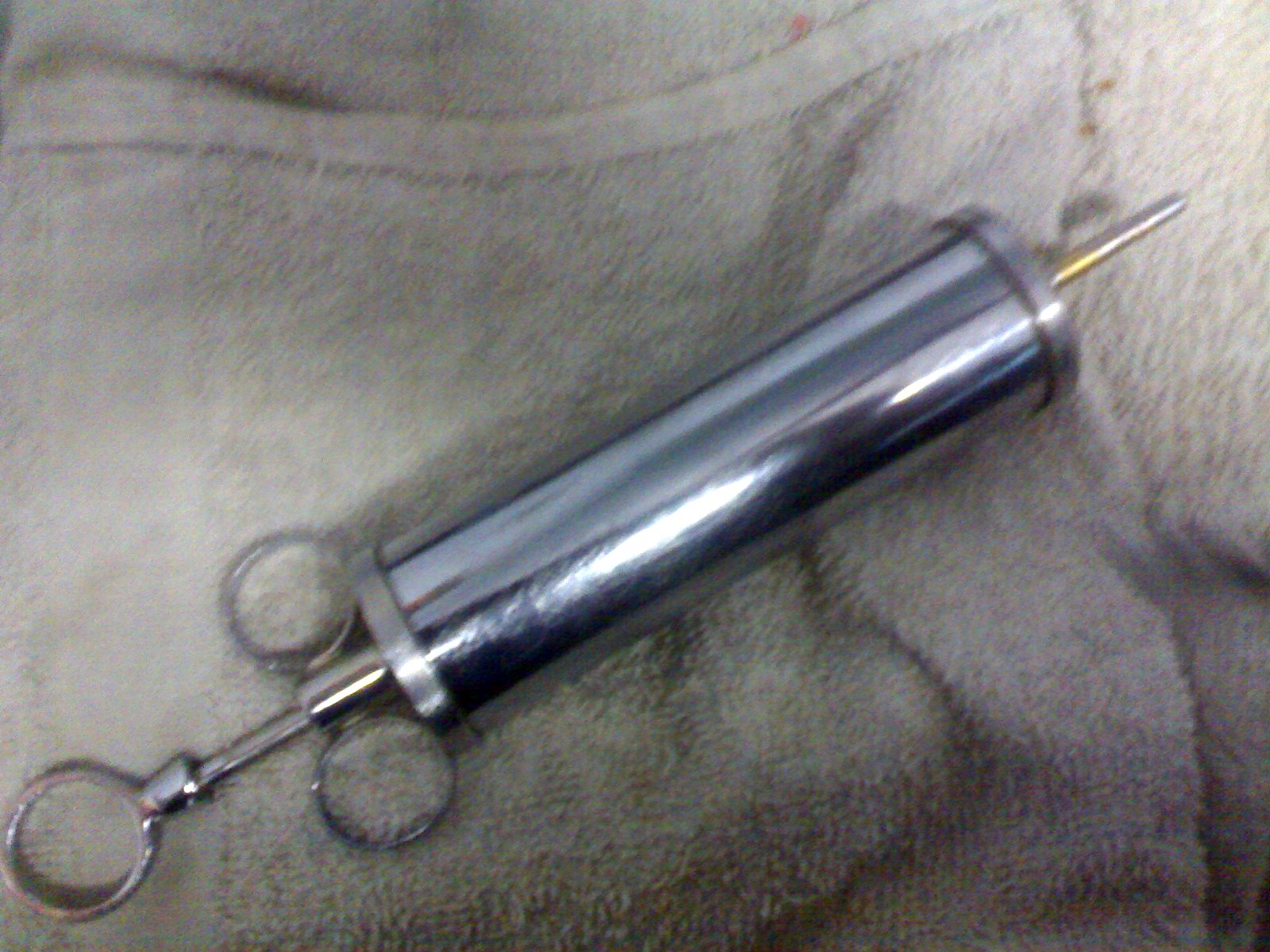
Aural or ear syringe

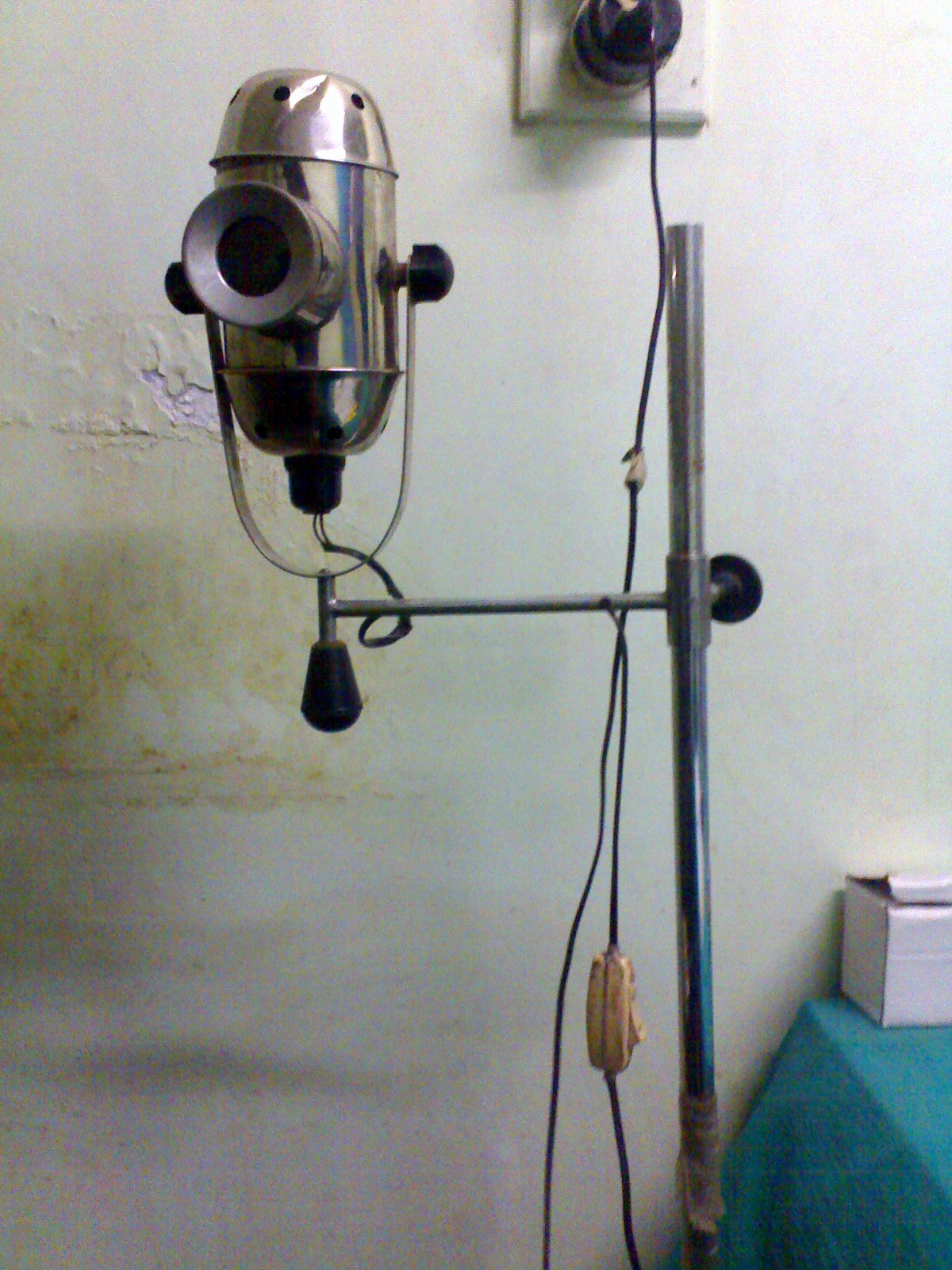
Bull's eye lamp

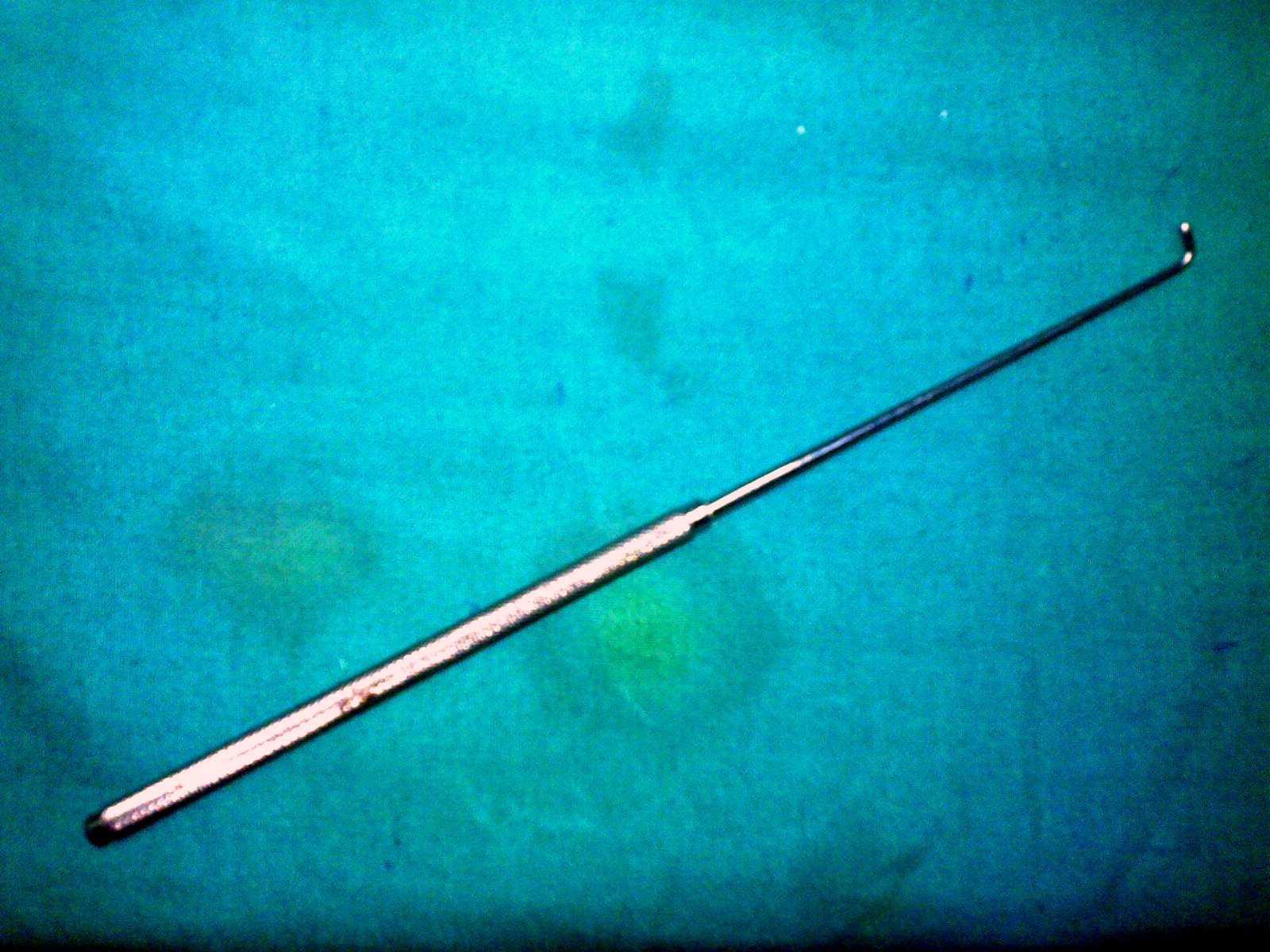
Foreign body hook

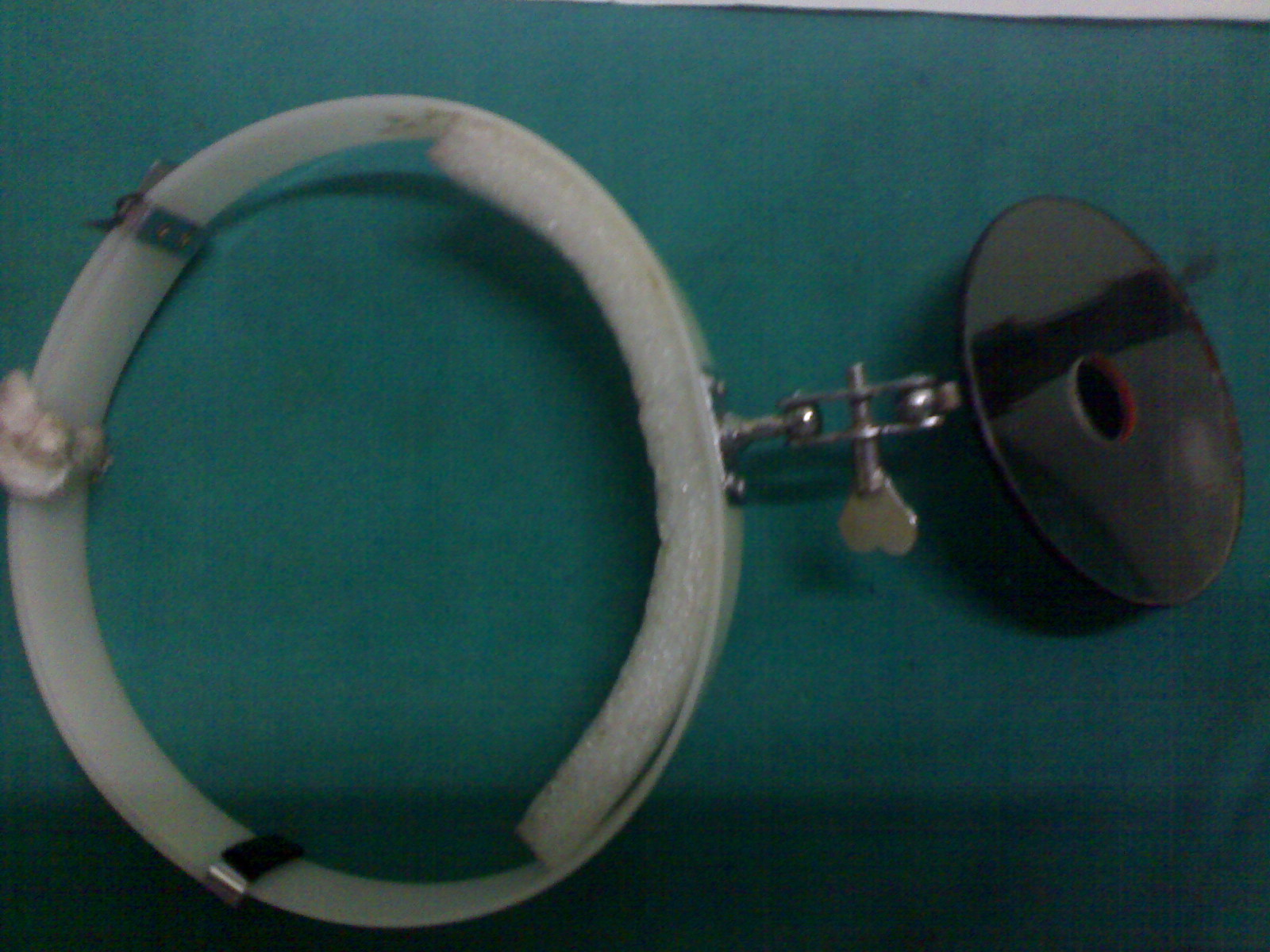
Head Mirror

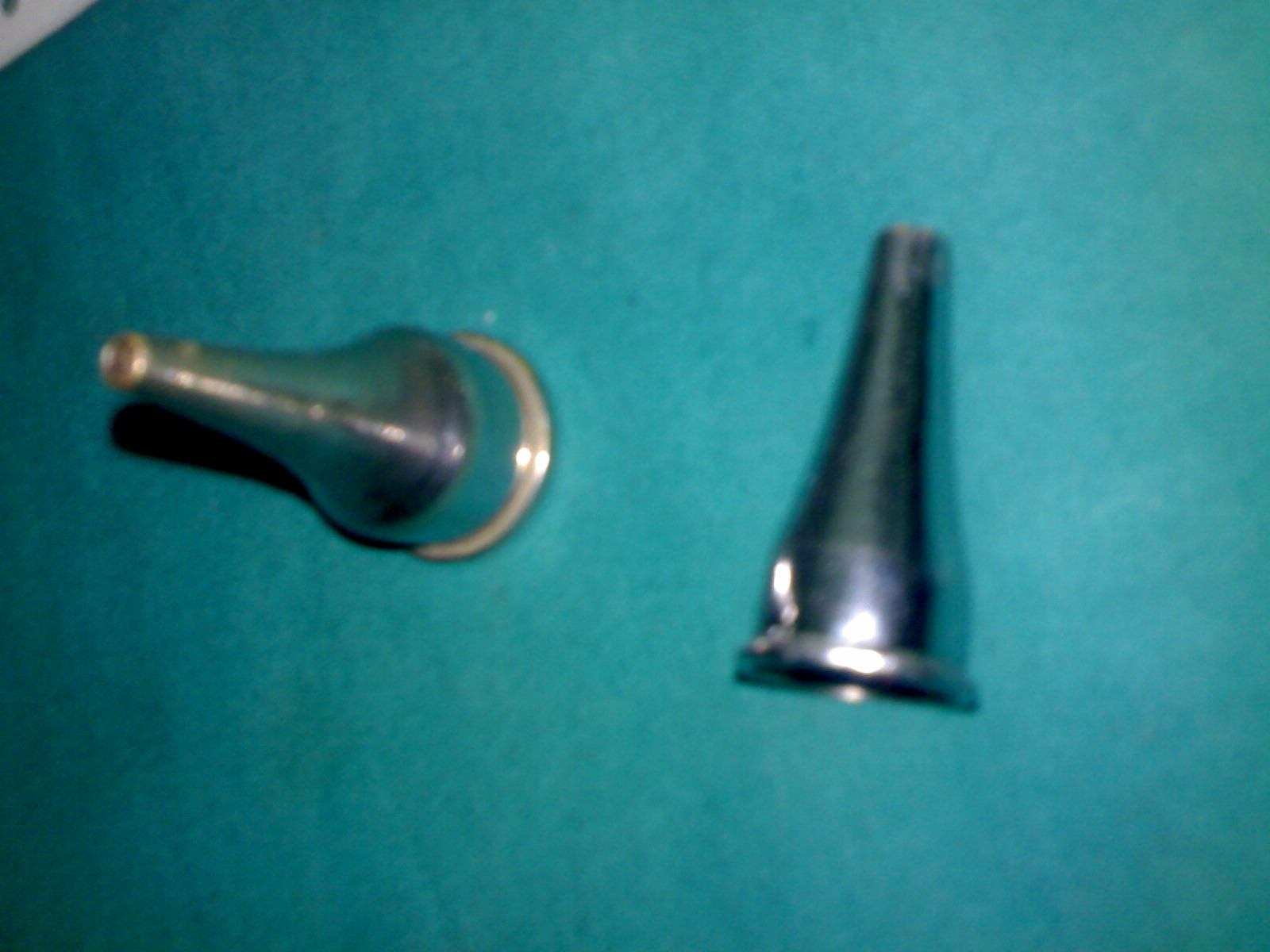
Aural/Ear speculum

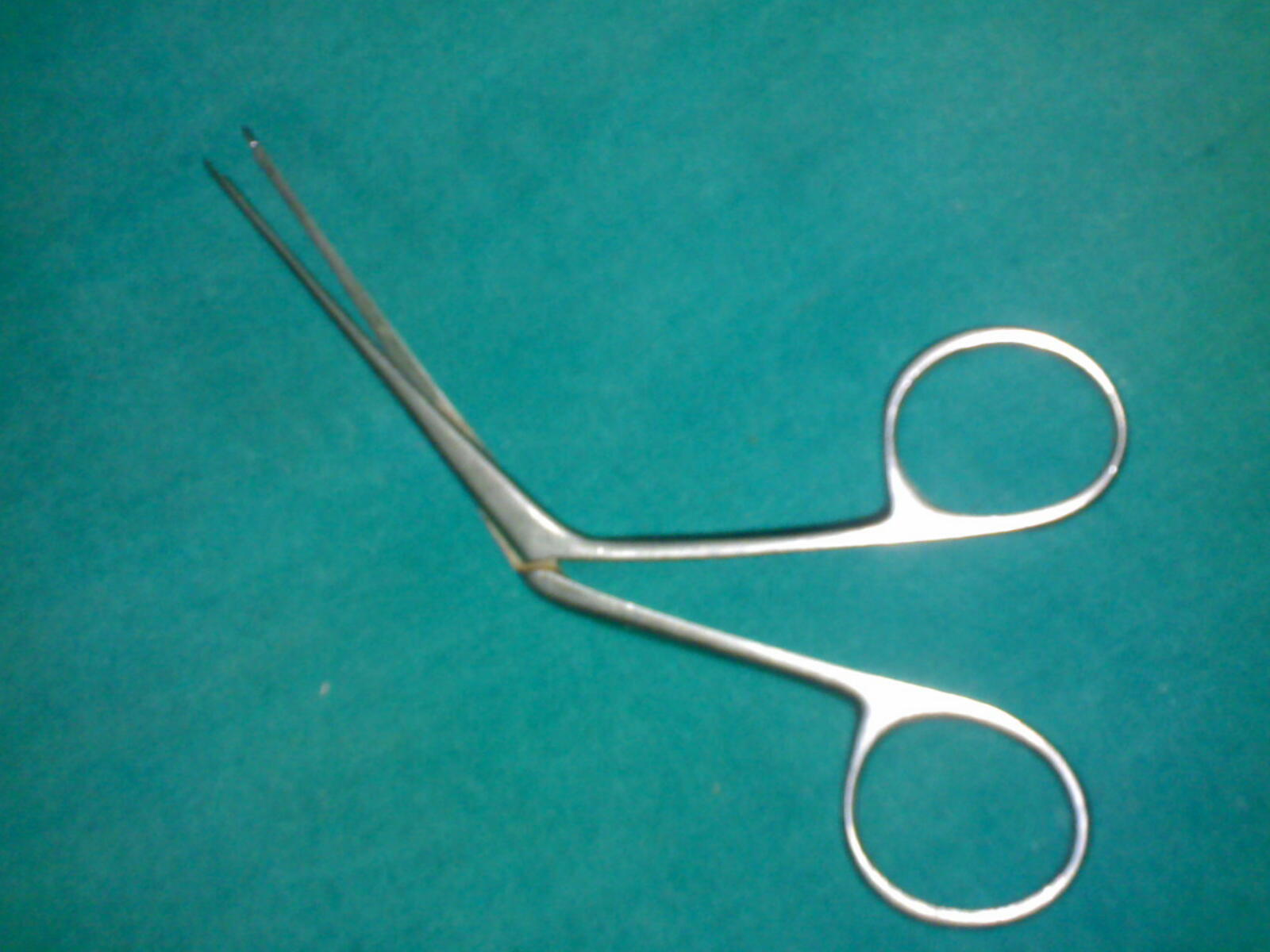
Hartmann's aural forceps

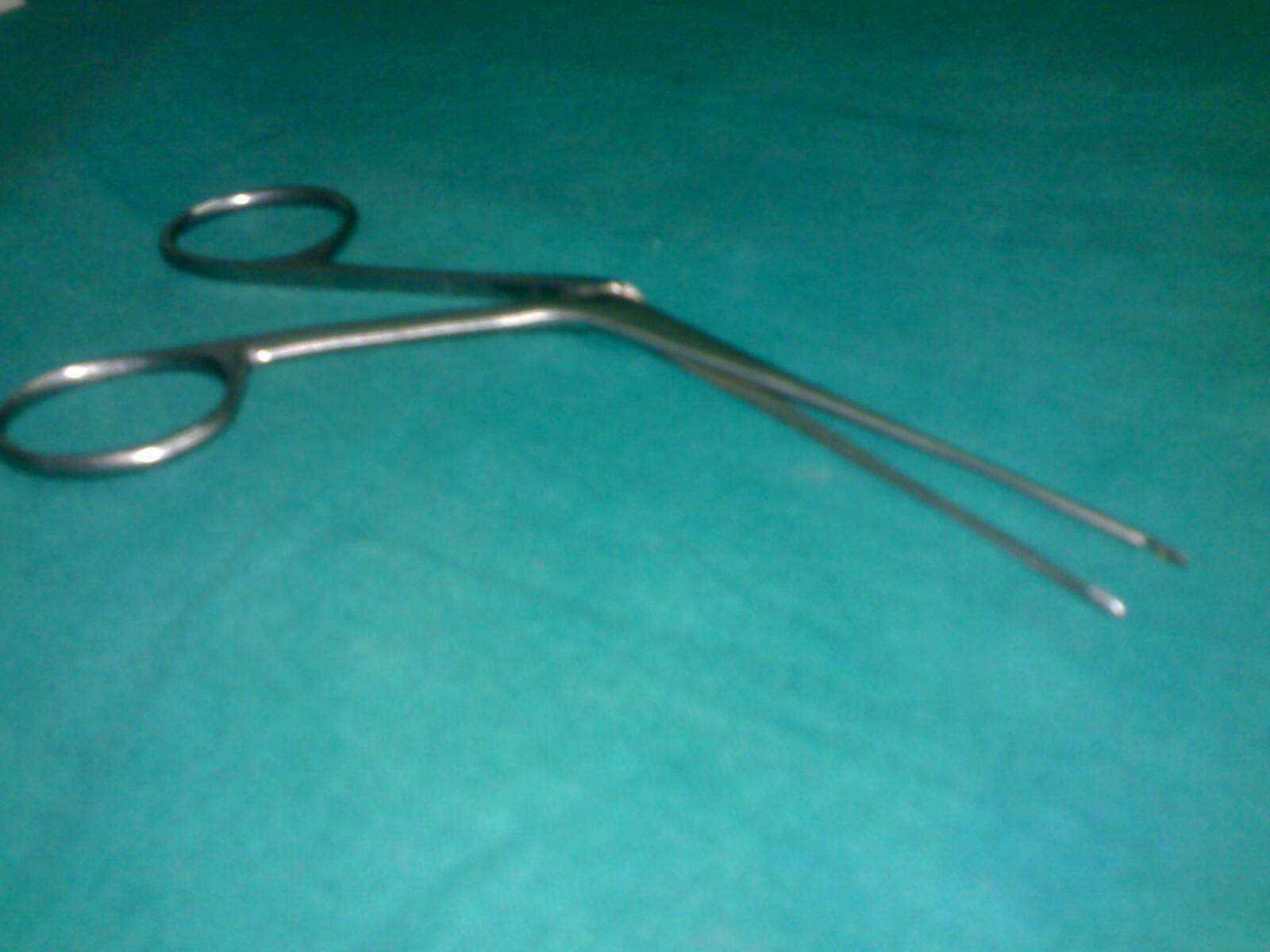
Hartmann's aural forceps

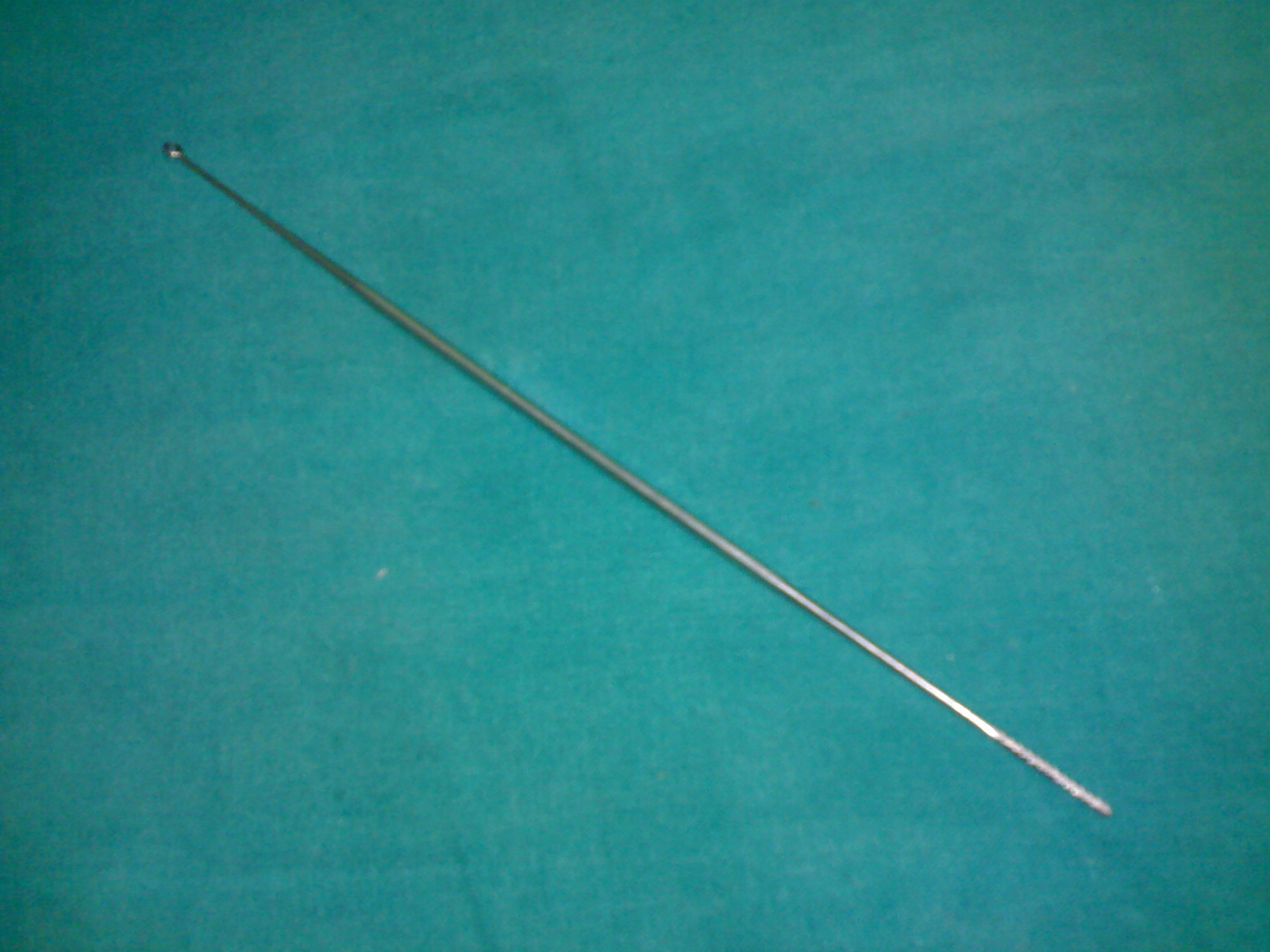
Jobson Horne's probe with ring curette

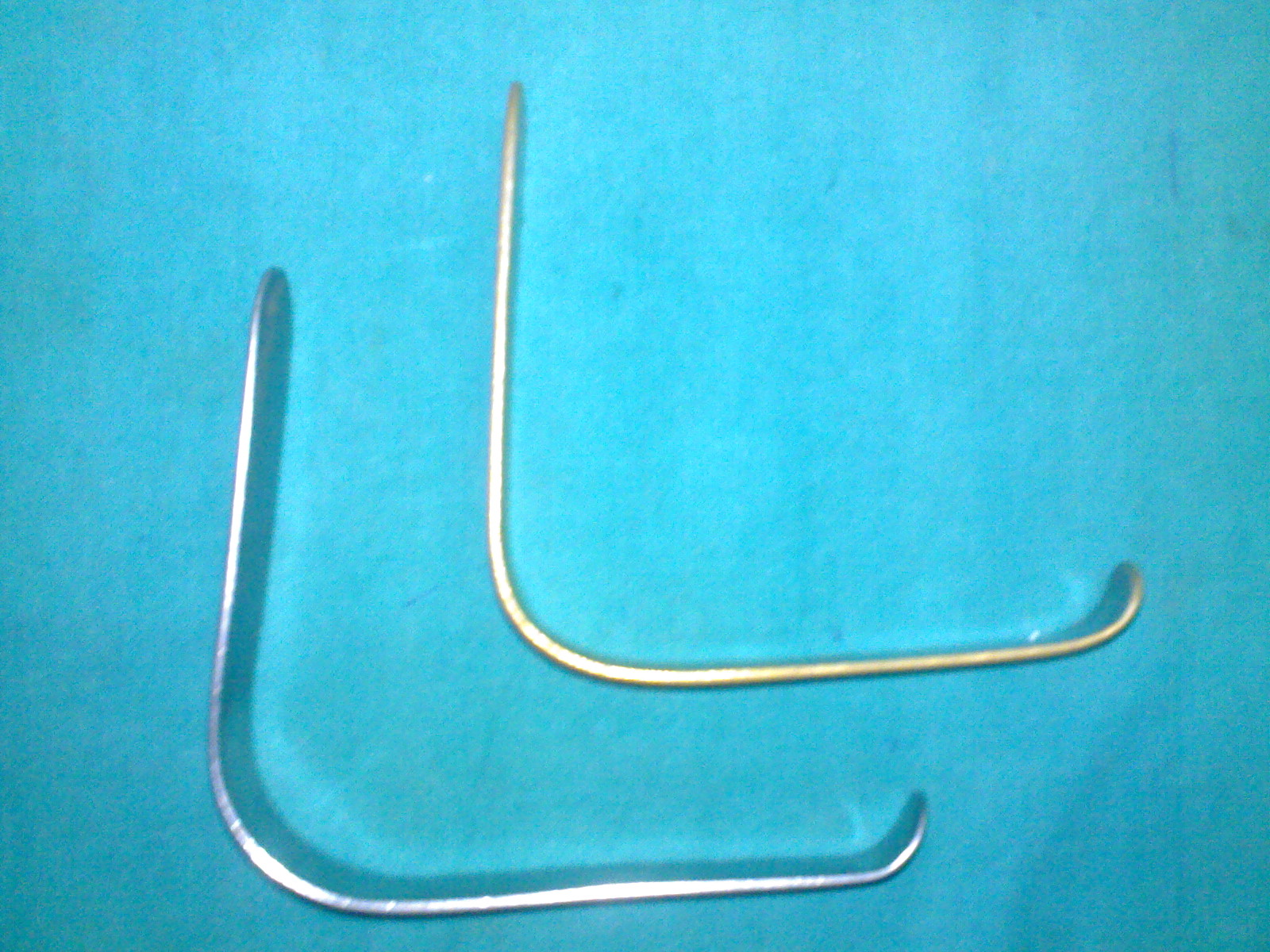
Lack's tongue depressor

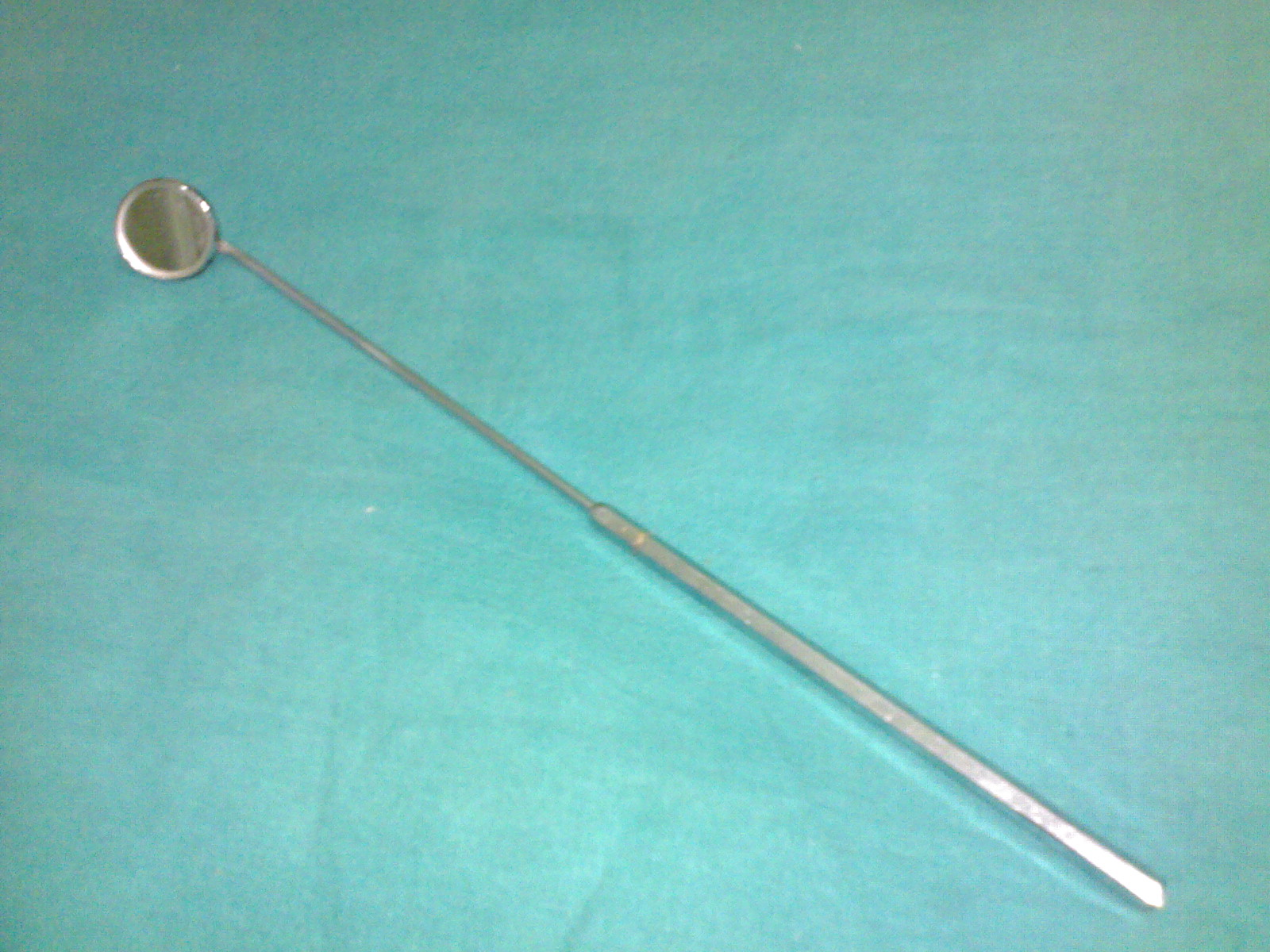
Laryngeal mirror

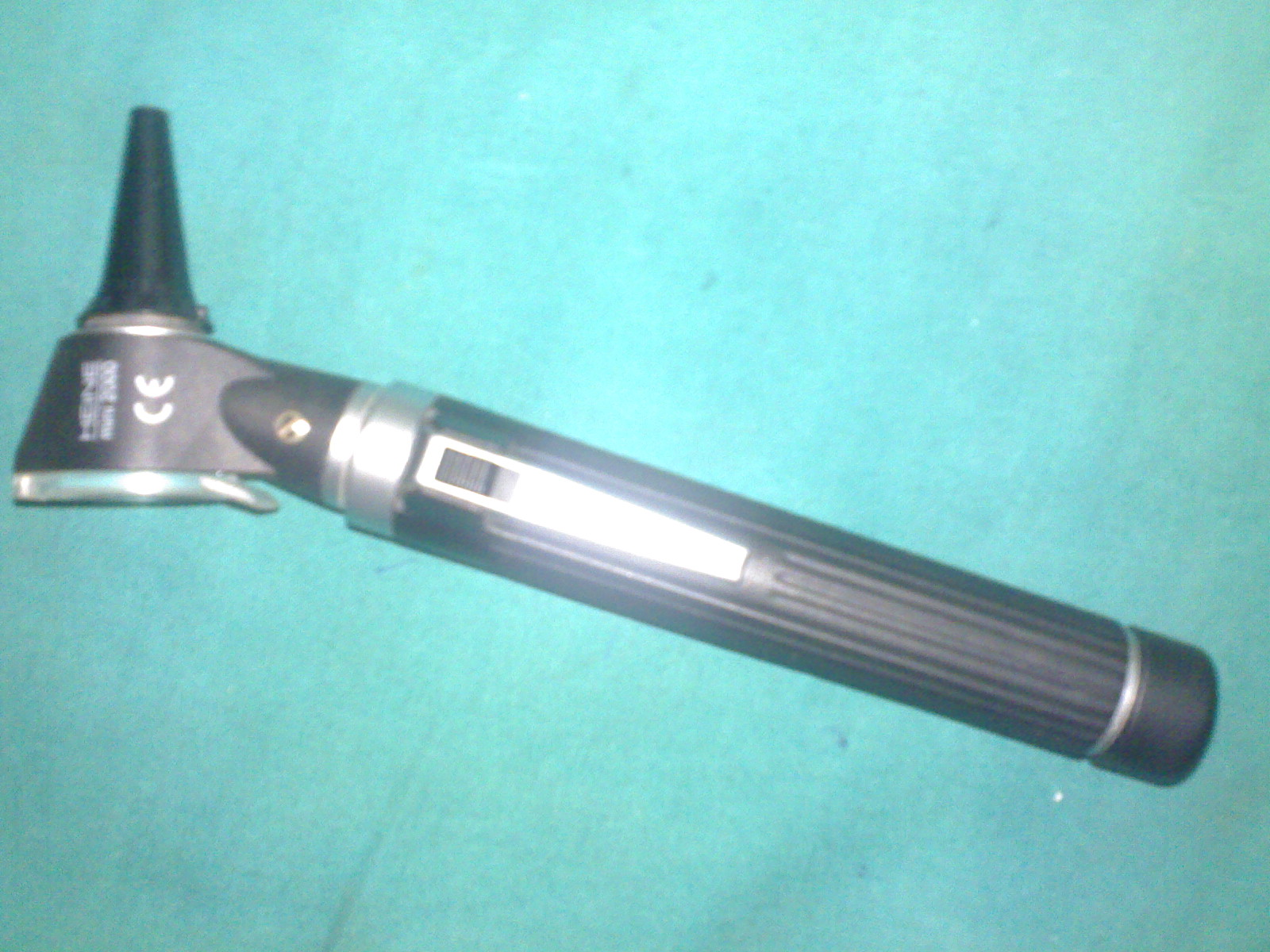
Otoscope or Auriscope

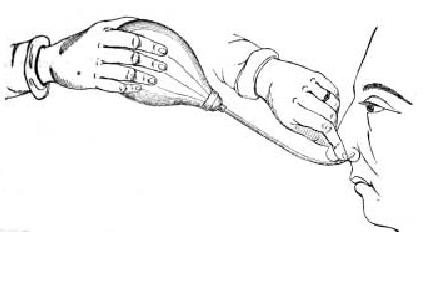
Pritchard's politzerization apparatus

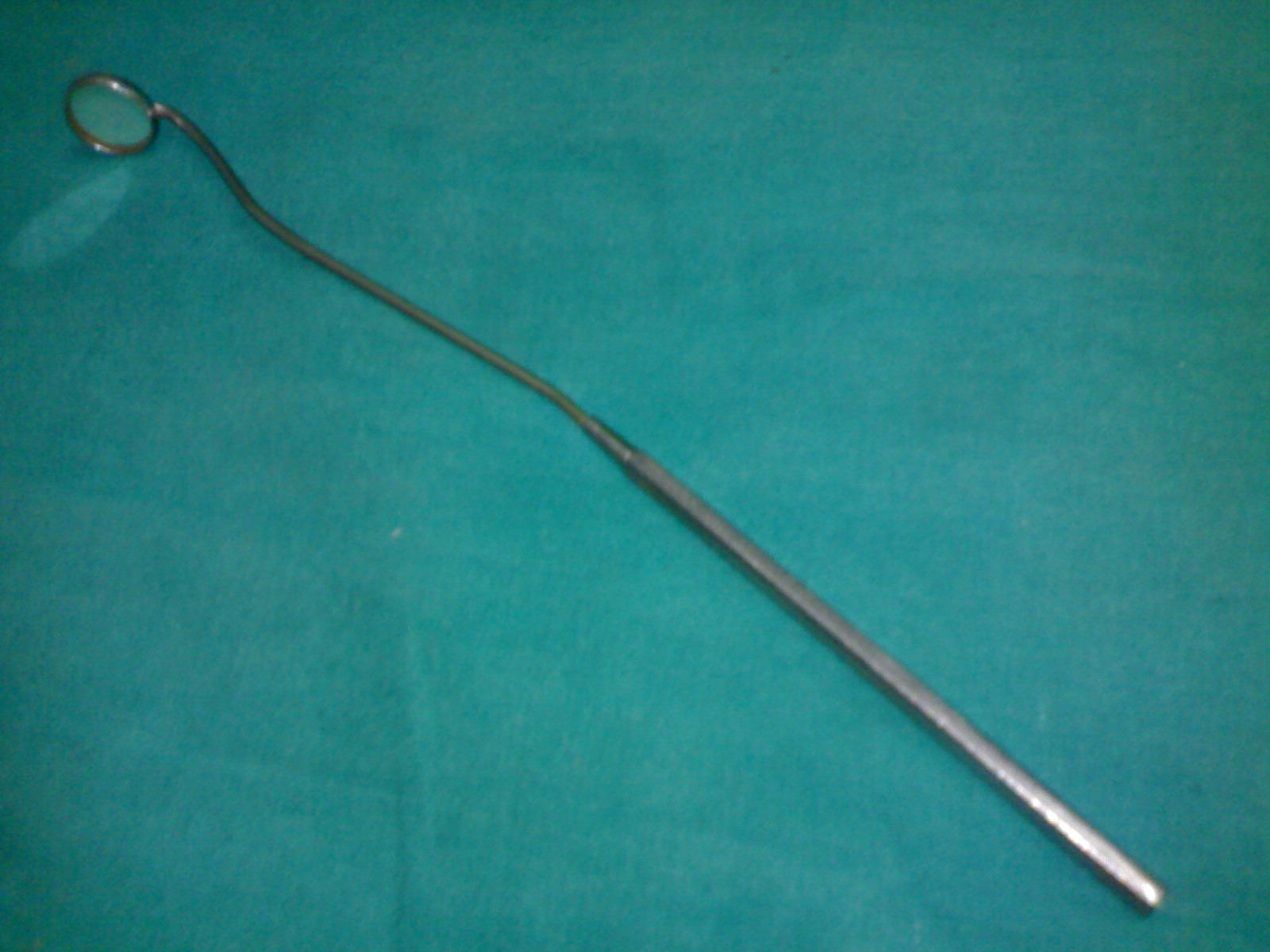
Posterior rhynoscopy mirror

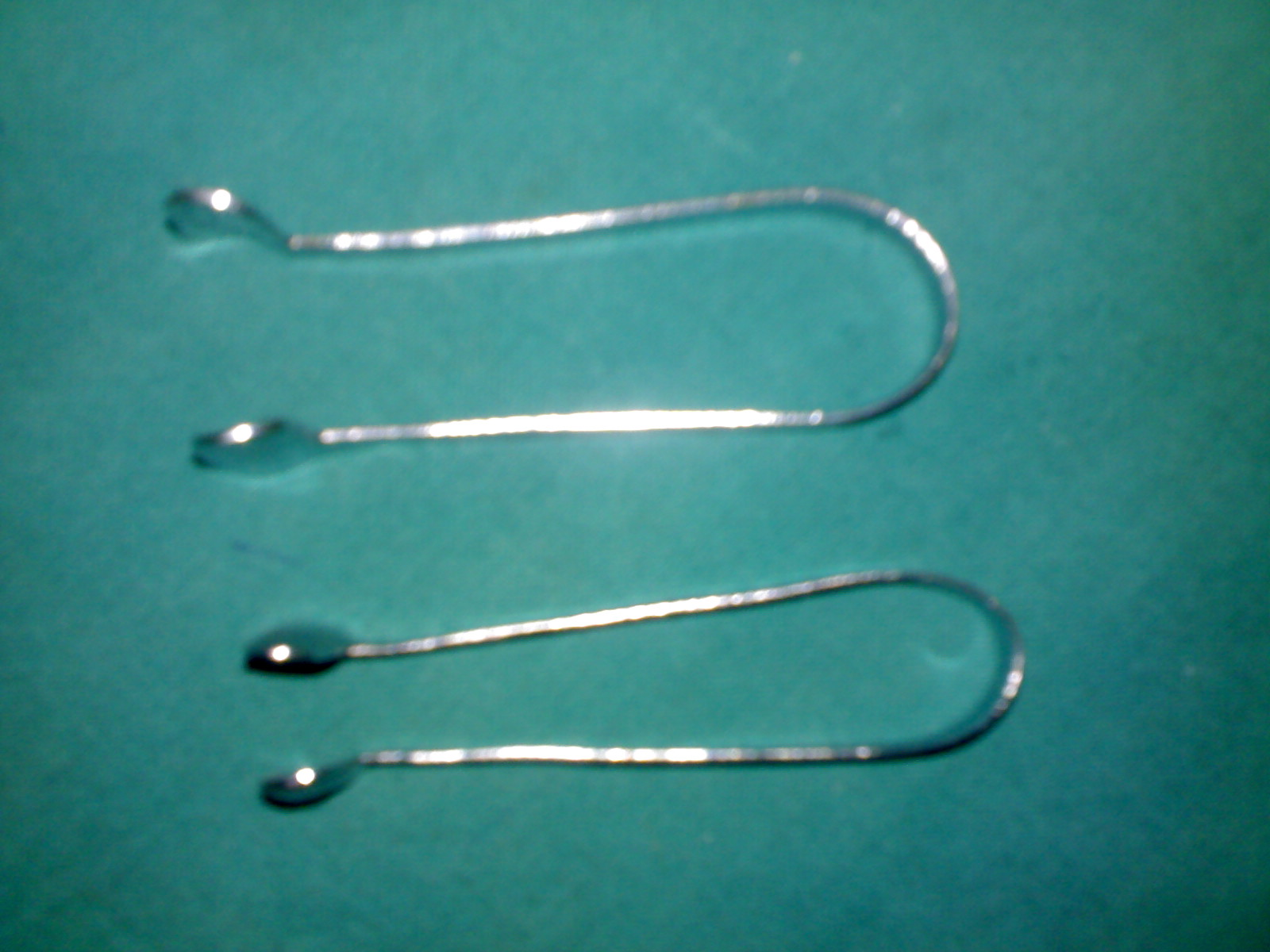
Thudichum's nasal speculum

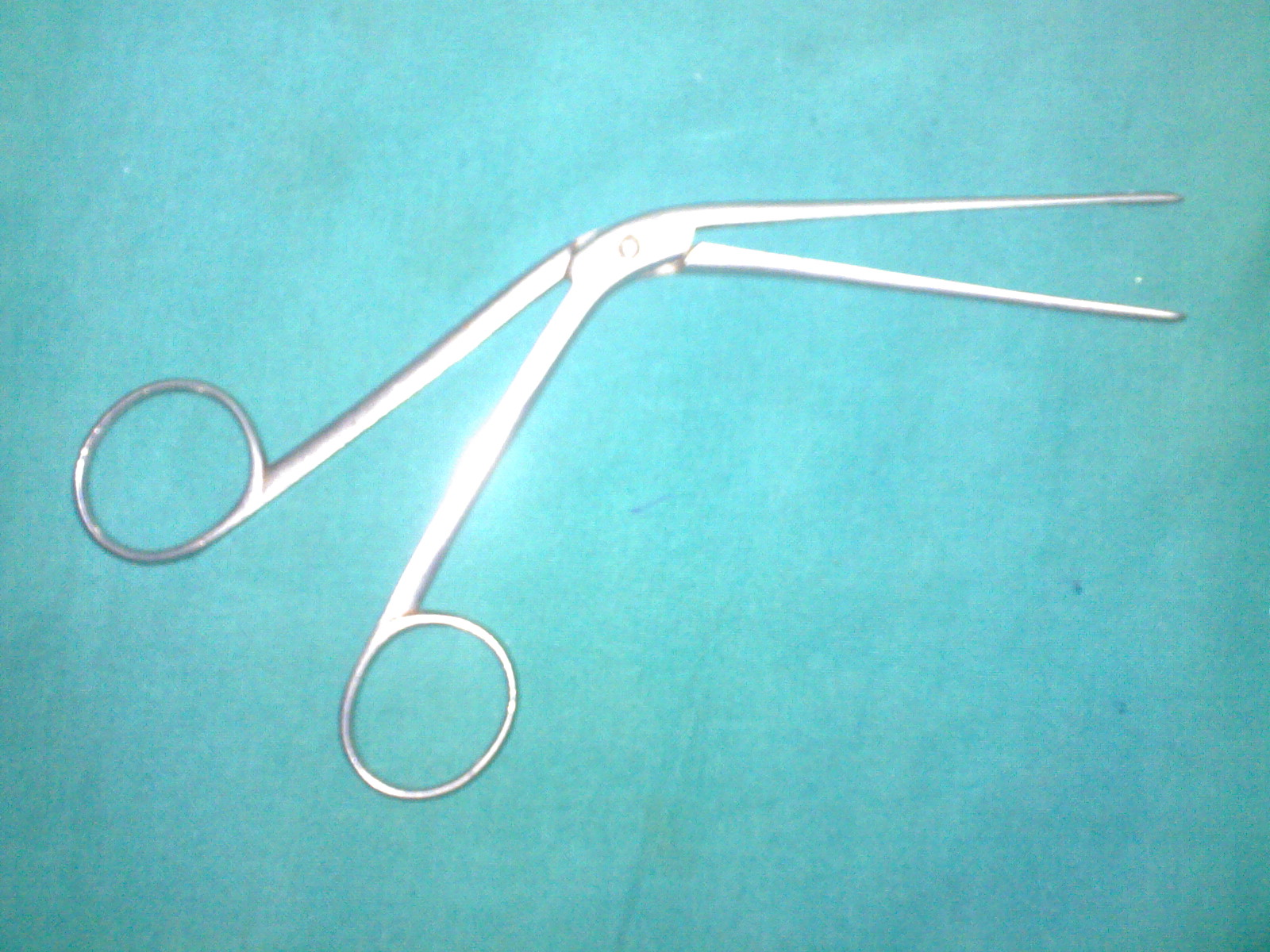
Tilly's nasal dressing forceps

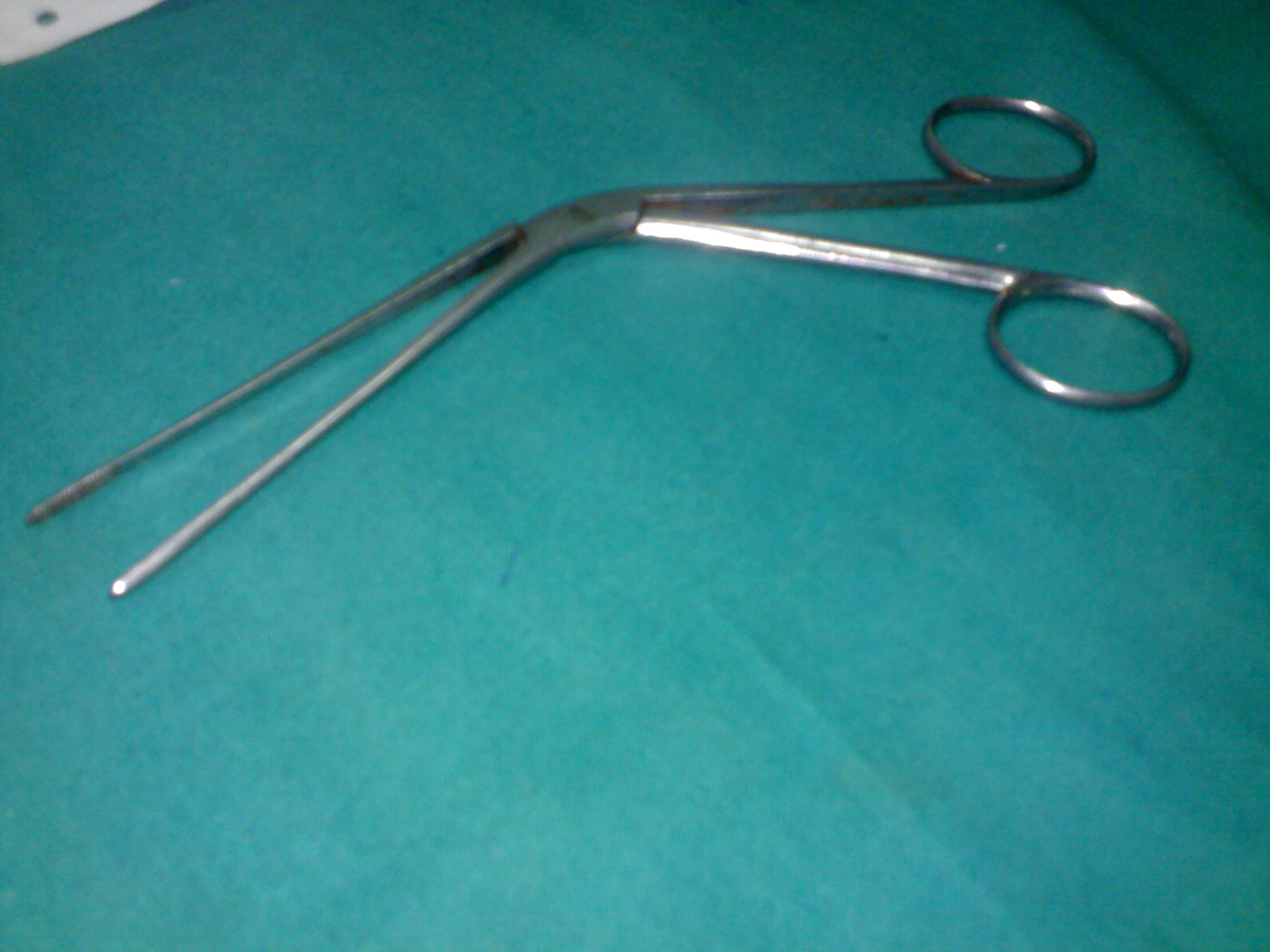
Tilly's nasal dressing forceps

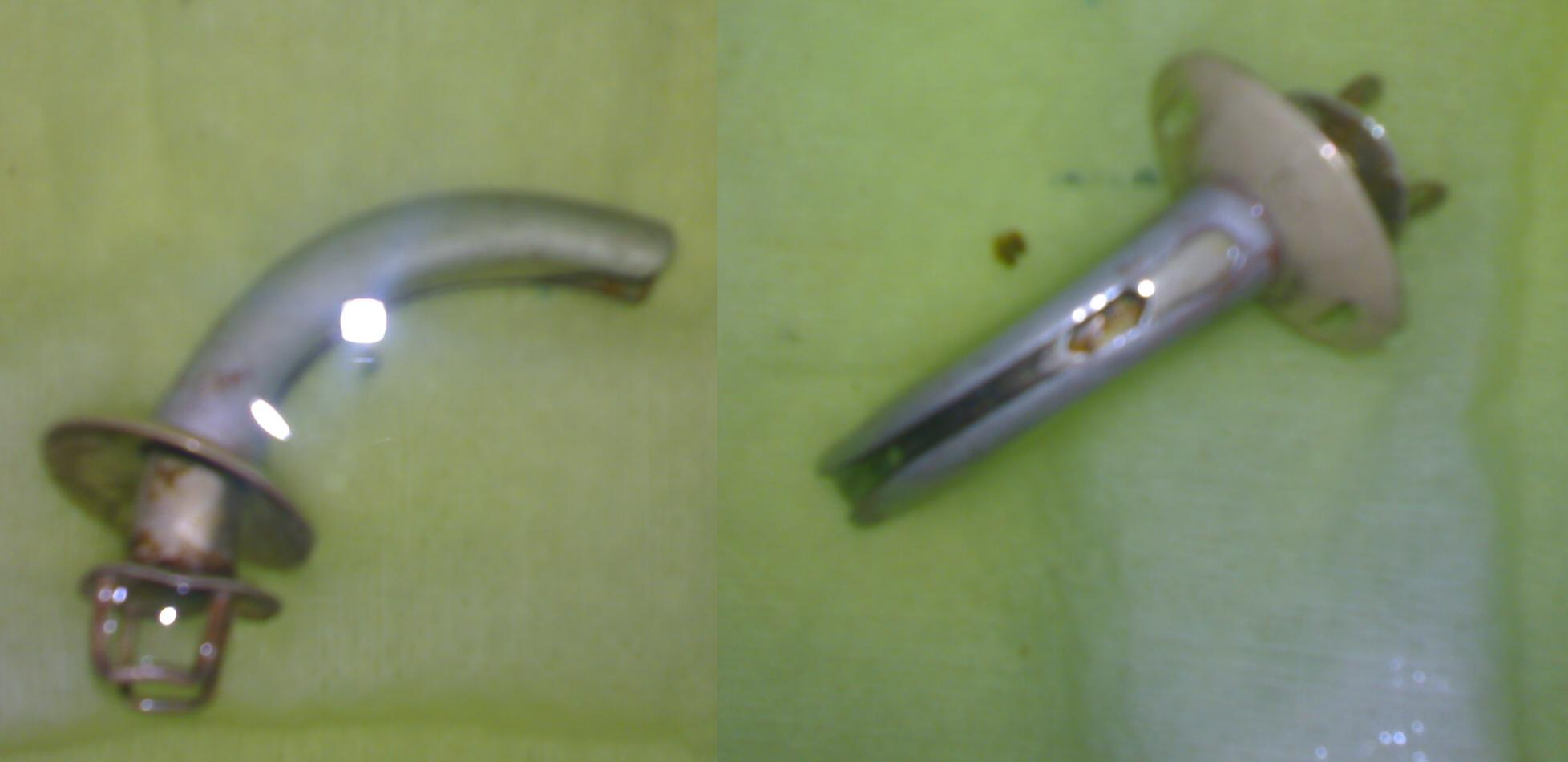
Fuller's bivalve metal tracheostomy tube

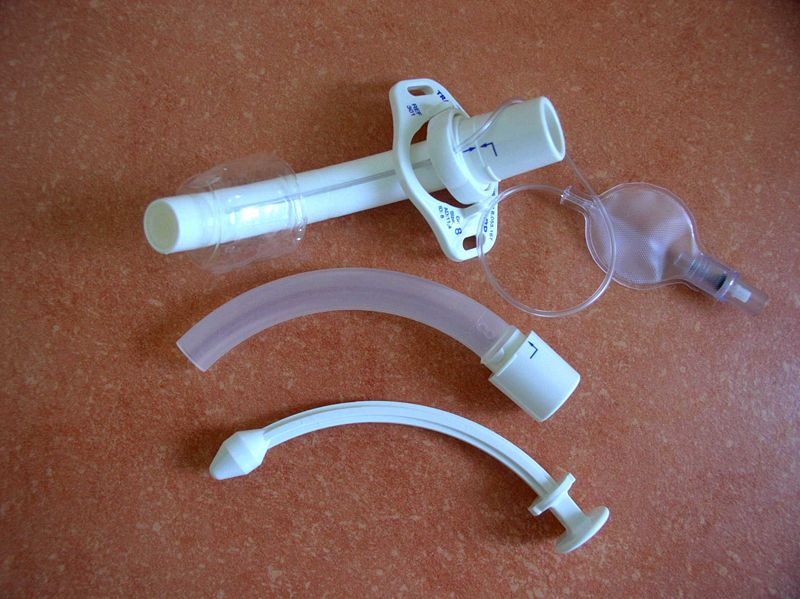
Plastic tracheostomy tube

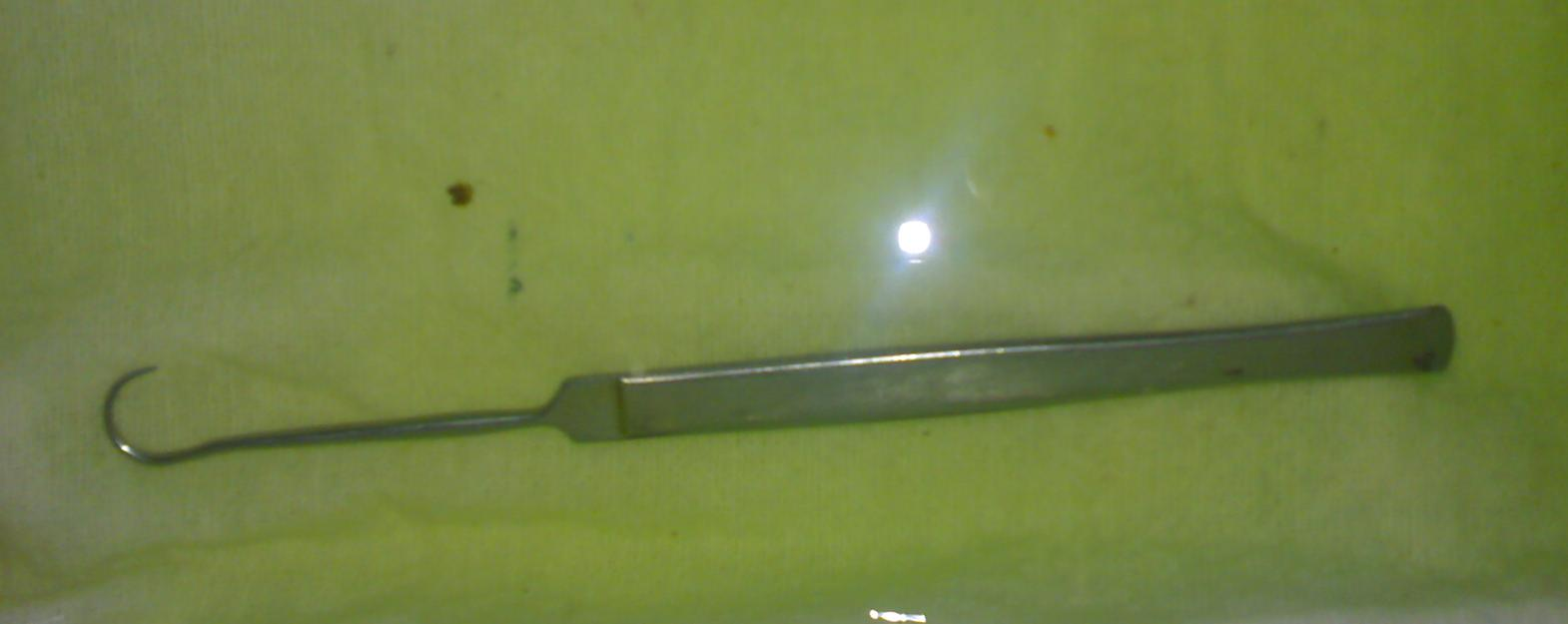
Single hook retractor

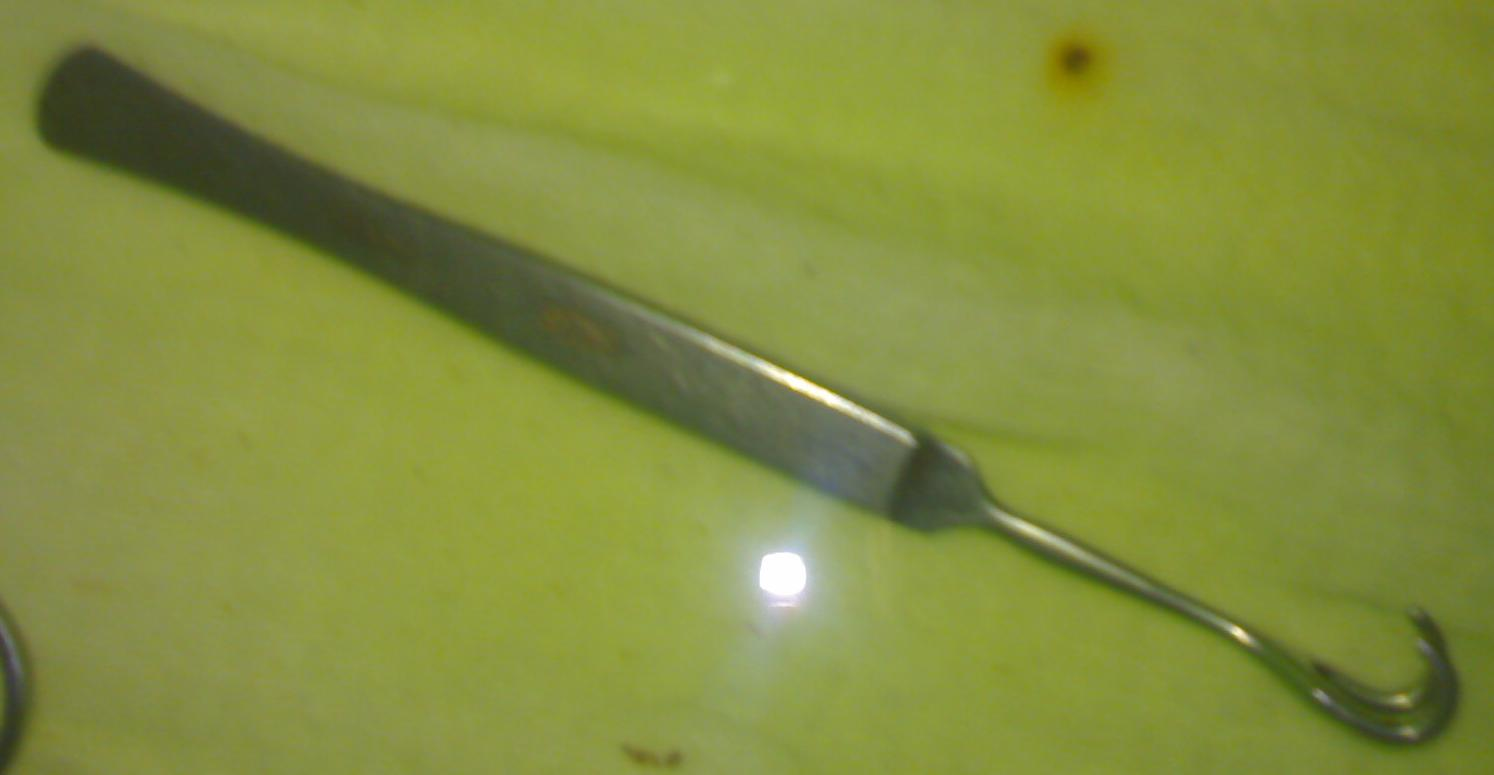
Double hook retractor

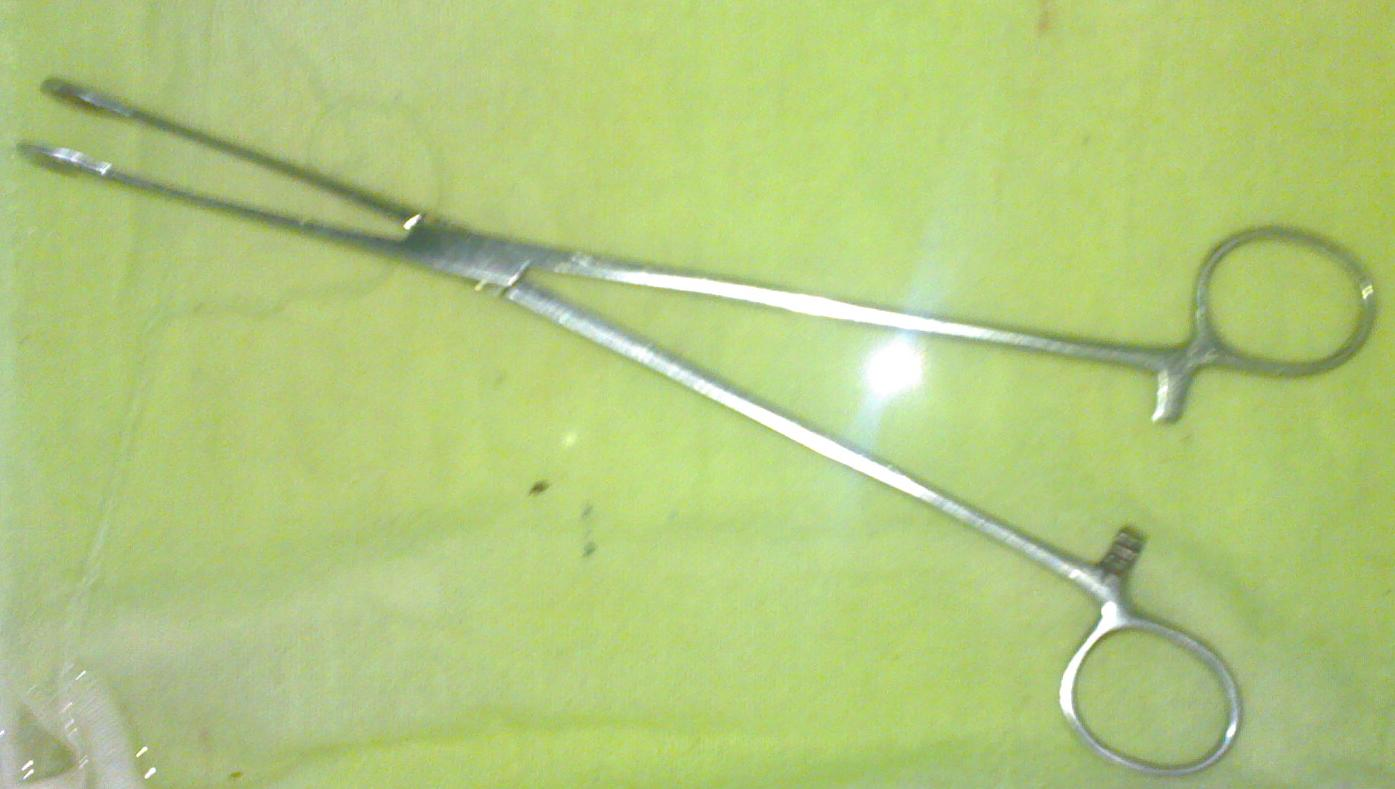
Surgical sponge forceps

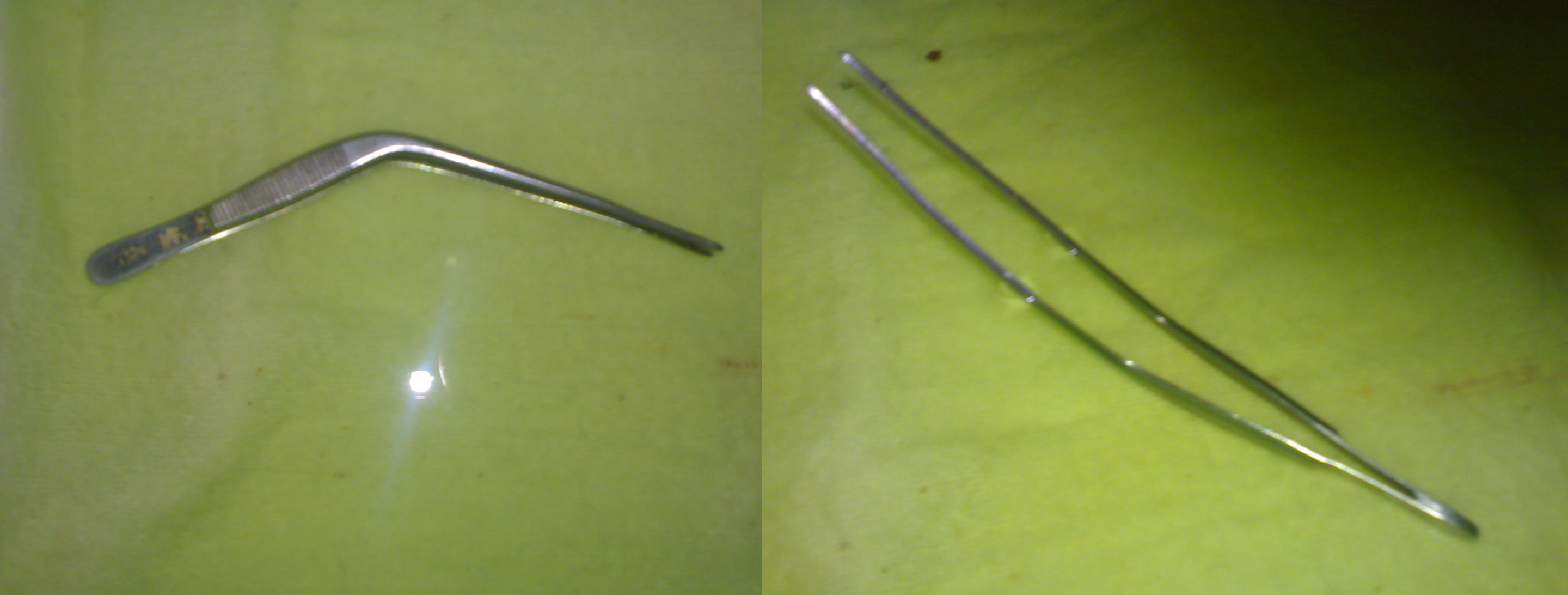
Fagge's aural forceps

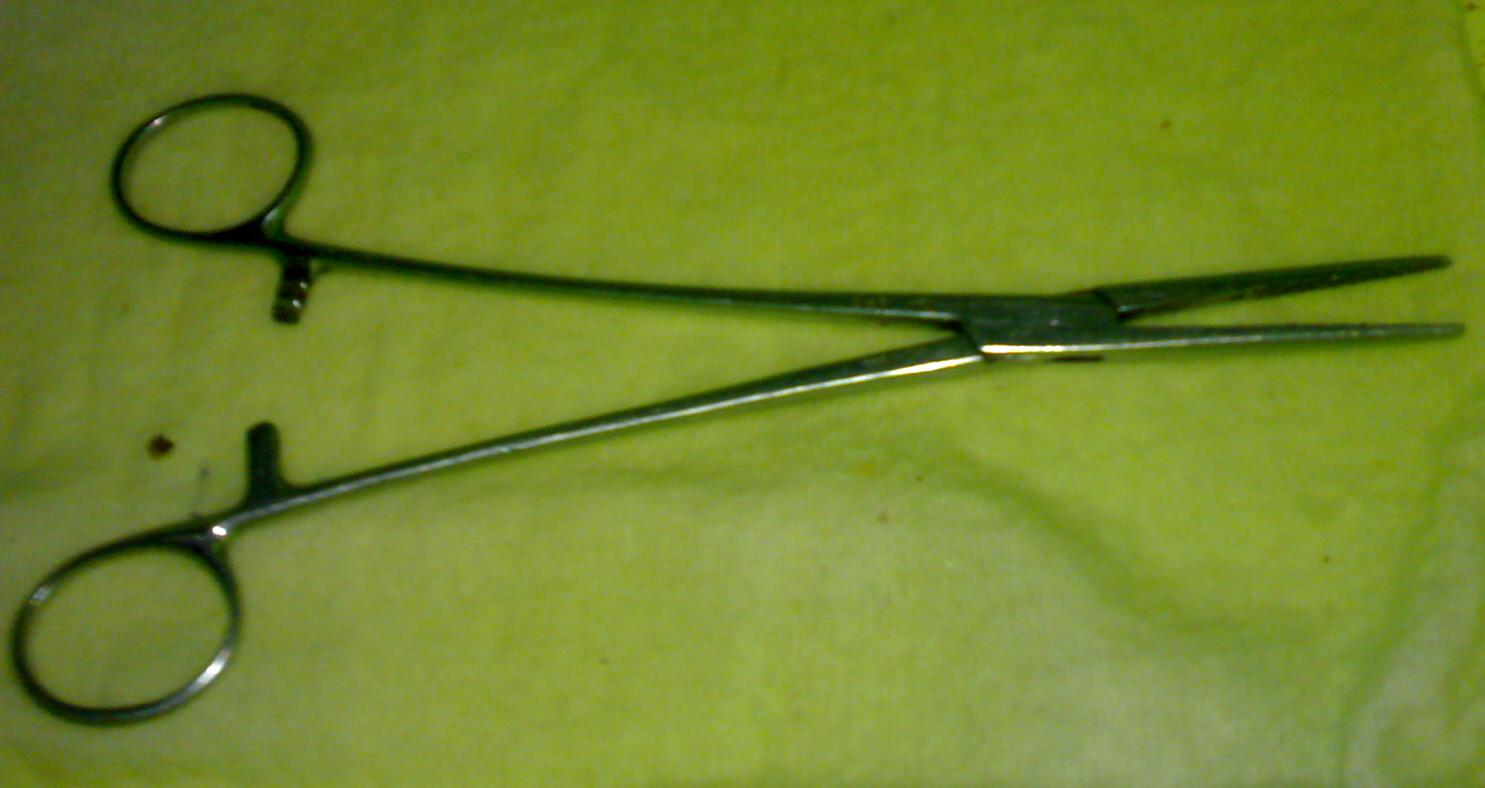
Tonsil artery forceps
