= Ádám Politzer =

Hungarian and Austrian physician (1835-1920)

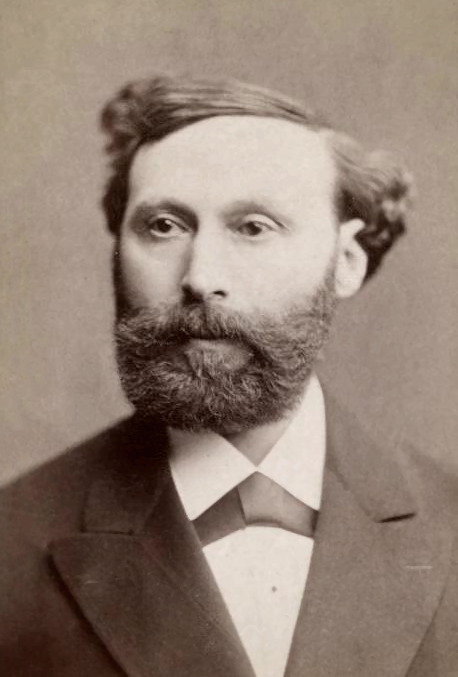
Ádám Politzer

Ádám Politzer (Hungarian: Politzer Ádám; 1 October 1835, Albertirsa, Pest, Hungary – 10 August 1920, in Vienna) was a Hungarian and Austrian physician and one of the pioneers and founders of otology.

== Life ==
Ádám Politzer was born in Alberti (now part of Albertirsa), near the city of Budapest, to a well-to-do Jewish family.

He studied medicine in the University of Vienna. Some of his teachers belonged to the Second "Vienna School", including Carl Freiherr von Rokitansky (1804–1878) and Josef Skoda (1805–1881) (its founders), as well as Joseph Hyrtl (1810–1894), Johann Ritter von Oppolzer (1808–1871), and the physiologist Carl Ludwig (1816–1895). The last two took interest in Politzer and were influential in his subsequent career.

Politzer received his M.D. in 1859 and started to work in Carl Ludwig's laboratory. His interest since that time was mainly the physics of the auditory system. There, he was the first to demonstrate physiologically that the innervation of the tensor tympani muscle was by the trigeminal nerve and that the innervation of the stapedial muscle was by the facial nerve. In another series of experiments, Politzer connected two manometers, one placed in the external auditory canal meatus and another in the pharynx, in order to study air movements through the Eustachian tube. In 1861, he published his first results on a new technique based on this knowledge, to treat internal ear diseases by insufflating the middle ear through the Eustachian tube, which obviated the need of its catheterisation. This came to be known as politzerisation. In the subsequent decades, the technique was widely adopted throughout the world, bringing fame to Politzer.

In the following year, Politzer travelled to other centers and countries, seeking to increase the depth of his practical training. Thus, he worked consecutively with Anton Friedrich Freiherr von Troeltsch (1829–1890) and physiologist Heinrich Müller, in Würzburg; Hermann Helmholtz (1821–1894) in Heidelberg. He also went to Paris, France, to study with Rudolf Körni, Prosper Ménière, the "father of physiology", Claude Bernard (1813–1878) and with physicist Karl Rudolf König (1832–1901). He also studied microscopic anatomy of the labyrinth with Albert von Kölliker (1817–1905) in Würzburg, and ear surgery with Joseph Toynbee (1815–1866) in London, England.

Returning to Vienna in 1861, Politzer became a professor of otology at the University of Vienna with the support of von Oppolzer. Two years later, in 1863, he opened a private otological clinic with Josef Gruber (1827–1900), which soon began to attract patients from all over the world. In 1864 Politzer was allowed by the government to treat indigent patients at the charity hospital as well as in the homes for elderly. He and Gruber received the title of professor extraordinarius in 1870 and were appointed to the rank of a joint directorship to a new clinic in the Vienna General Hospital, in the next year (the first of its kind in the world). In 1895 Politzer won a full professorship and became the sole director of the clinic in 1889, until 1907. He died 13 years later, in 1920, at the age of 85, celebrated as one of the pioneers of modern otology in the history of medicine, but unfortunately in a poor financial condition, due to the economic crisis in Austria after the country was defeated in the First World War.

== Works ==
Politzer was a prolific inventor of new medical devices for the diagnosis and treatment of ear diseases. He developed several surgical instruments which bear his name for the operation of the outer and the inner ear structures, such as an ear perforator, a surgical knife, a grommet for the ventilation of the middle ear after tympanocentesis, as well as a method to restore permeability to the Eustachian tube by using an insufflator made out of a pear-shaped rubber bag ("politzerisation" or Politzer's method). He also devised methods and apparatuses to examine the outer ear canal and tympanic membrane (Politzer's otoscope), a speculum and a qualitative test for the function of the Eustachian tube. In the field of hearing, Politzer devised an acoumeter for measuring hearing acuity and at least two early acoustical hearing aids.

Furthermore, he revolutionised the clinical diagnosis of aural diseases by the inspection of the illuminated tympanic membrane (which led to the current otoscope), and developed the first illustrated atlas of the tympanic membrane in health and disease, with color drawings made by himself. Politzer also wrote one of the most outstanding and authoritative textbooks on otology of the century, the Lehrbuch der Ohrenheilkunde, in 1878. With von Troeltsch and Hermann Schwartze, he founded Archiv für Ohrenheilkunde, the first journal dedicated to ear disorders.

A great anatomist of the auditory system, Politzer wrote and illustrated extensively on it, and left a remarkable collection of anatomic and pathological specimens in Vienna, which were donated to the Anatomy and Pathology Museum. The luminous cone of the tympanic membrane is named after him, as well as the Unna–Politzer nevus, a typical birthmark found on the nape of the neck in 25 to 50% of normal persons. In addition, in 1893 Politzer was the first to describe otosclerosis as a separate clinical entity. He also studied the pathology of cholesteatoma, serous otitis media, labyrinthitis, congenital deafness and intracranial complications of otitis media.

One of his biographers, Albert Mudry, stated that Politzer was "the greatest otologist of the 19th century and one of the greatest of all time (...) he covered all fields of otology". He influenced and trained thousands of otologists from over the world, and his best-known successor was Robert Bárány, who received the Nobel Prize for medicine in 1914.

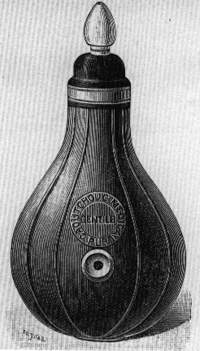
Politzer balloon with olive

== Bibliography ==
- Die Beleuchtungsbilder des Trommelfells im gesunden und kranken Zustande. Vienna, W. Braumüller, 1865. English translation, New York, 1869.
- Zehn Wandtafeln zur Anatomie des Gehörorgans. Vienna, 1873.
- Lehrbuch der Ohrenheilkunde. Stuttgart, F. Enke, 1878, 1882, 1893, 1902, 1908.
- Die anatomische und histologische Zergliederung des menschlichen Gehörorgans im normalen und kranken Zustande. Vienna, 1889.
- Atlas der Beleuchtungsbilder des Trommelfells. Vienna, 1899.
- Geschichte der Ohrenheilkunde. 2 volumes. Stuttgart, F. Enke, 1907 and 1913.
- Atlas und Grundriss der Ohrenheilkunde. Unter Mitwirkung von A. Politzer herausgegeben von Gustav Brühl. Munich, 1901. Volume 24 of Lehmanns Medizinische Handatlanten.
