= Anton von Troeltsch =

German otologist

Anton Freiherr von Tröltsch (3 April 1829 – 9 January 1890) was a German otologist who was a native of Schwabach.

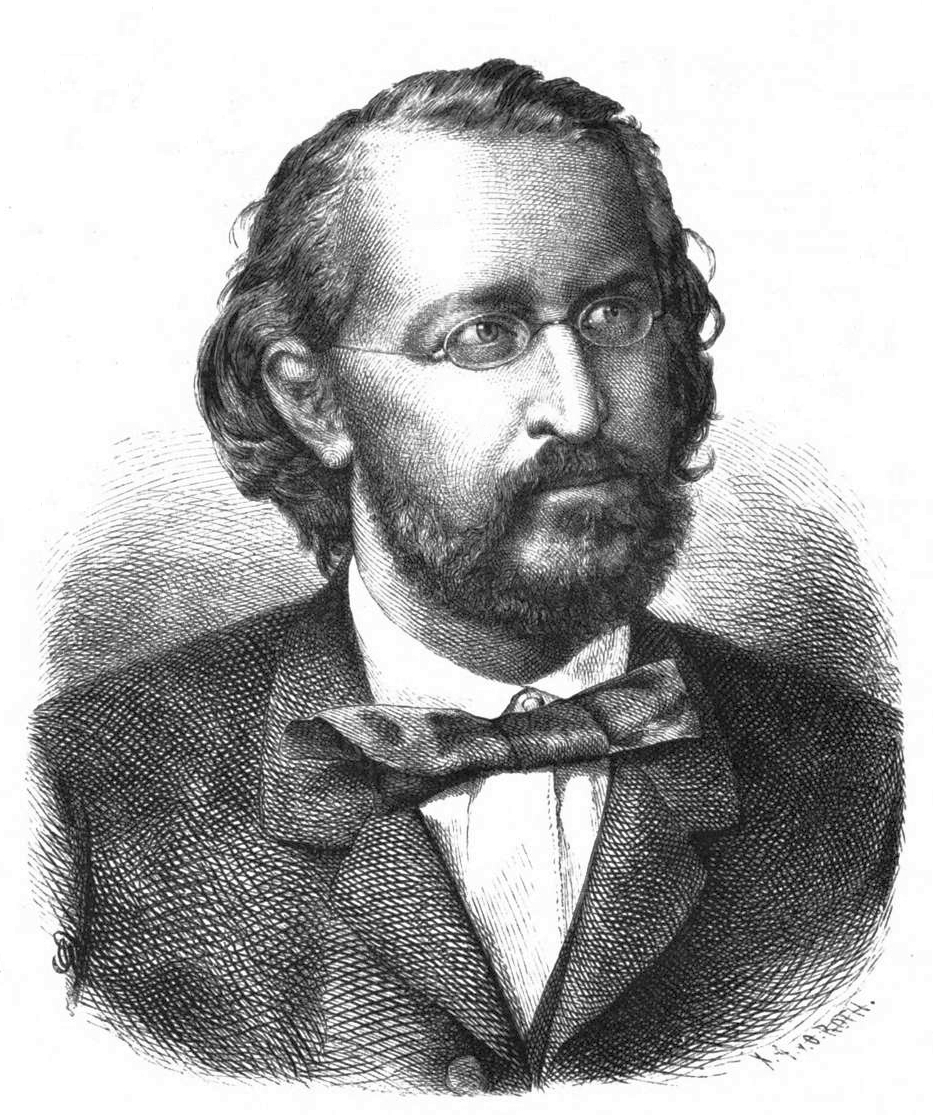

== Academic career ==
He studied sciences at the Ludwig-Maximilians-Universität München, and afterwards studied medicine at the University of Würzburg, where in 1853 he received his medical doctorate. He continued his education at the Friedrich Wilhelm University of Berlin with Albrecht von Graefe (1828–1870), and at Charles University in Prague with ophthalmologist Carl Ferdinand von Arlt (1812–1887). In addition, he studied otological medicine in the British Isles with Joseph Toynbee (1815–1866) and William Wilde (1815–1876). He subsequently returned to the University of Würzburg, where in 1864 he became an associate professor (extraordinarius). Among his better known students were otologists Friedrich Bezold (1842–1908) and Abraham Kuhn (1838–1900).

== Work in otology ==
Tröltsch was a pioneer of modern otology, and made improvements involving diagnostics and pathological-anatomical research in the study of the ear. He is credited for popularizing the "reflecting aural mirror" (a device consisting of a concave mirror with an aperture in the center) for use in otoscopy. In 1864, with Adam Politzer (1835–1920) and Hermann Schwartze (1837–1910), he founded the first journal dedicated to ear disorders, called Archiv für Ohrenheilkunde (Archive for Otology).

His name is lent to "Tröltsch's recesses", or singularly called the "anterior and posterior pouches of Tröltsch", which are anatomical spaces between the malleolar folds and the tympanic membrane. Today in Germany, the "Anton von Tröltsch Prize" is an annual award given to the best published work in the field of ENT, (Ear, Nose and Throat). Also, a specialized medical tool known as "Troeltsch forceps" is named after him.

== Terms ==
- Troeltsch's spaces — Two small pouches of mucous membrane in the upper part of the attic of the middle ear.

Dorland's Medical Dictionary (1938)

== Published works ==
- "The diseases of the ear, their diagnosis and treatment: a text-book of aural surgery in the form of academical lectures by Anton von Tröltsch"; translated from the German and edited by D.B. St. John Roosa. New York: William Wood, 1864
- Die Untersuchung des Gehörorganes an der Leiche; in Virchow's Archiv (3/1858) - Investigation of the auditory organs.
- Die Untersuchung des Gehörgangs und Trommelfells. Ihre Bedeutung. Kritik der bisherigen Untersuchungsmethoden und Angabe einer neuen.; Deutsche Klinik Berlin (12/1860) - Examination of the ear canal and eardrum. Their importance. Critique of existing research methods and specification of a new one.
- Die Anatomie des Ohrs in ihrer Anwendung auf die Praxis und die Krankheiten des Gehörorgans; Würzburg (1861) - Anatomy of the ear, etc.
- Lehrbuch der Ohrenkrankheiten; Würzburg (1862) - Textbook on ear diseases.

== Sources ==
- This article incorporates translated text from an equivalent article at the German Wikipedia, whose references include: *Wikisource:ADB Anton Friedrich Freiherr von Troeltsch.
