= Gustav Brühl =

German otorhinolaryngologist

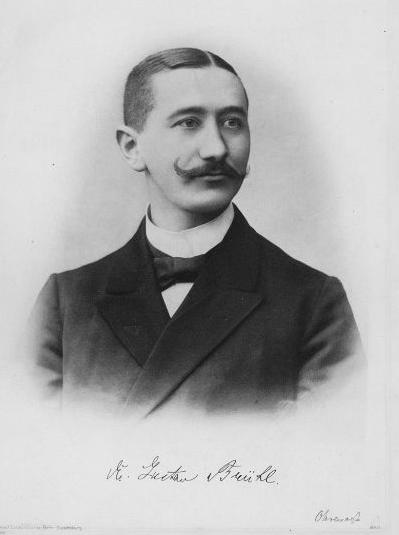
Gustav Ernst Brühl (1871-1939)

Gustav Ernst Brühl (18 June 1871 – 21 November 1939) was a German otorhinolaryngologist who was a native of Berlin.

He studied medicine in Freiburg and Berlin. and earned his doctorate in 1894. From 1903 until his retirement in 1933, he taught classes at the University of Berlin, where in 1922 he became an associate professor.

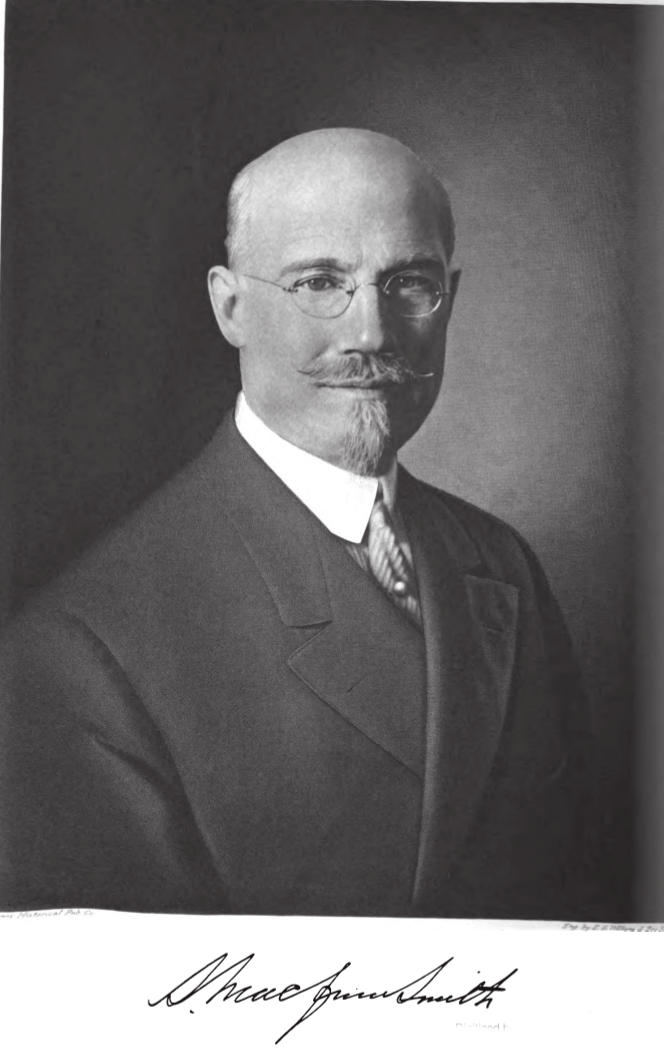
Seth MacCuen Smith

Brühl's best known written work was the highly regarded Atlas und Grundriss der Ohrenheilkunde, of which he was co-author along with Adam Politzer (1835-1920). In 1902 this book was translated into English by American otologist Seth MacCuen Smith as Atlas and Epitome of Otology.
