= Hermann Schwartze =

German aurist

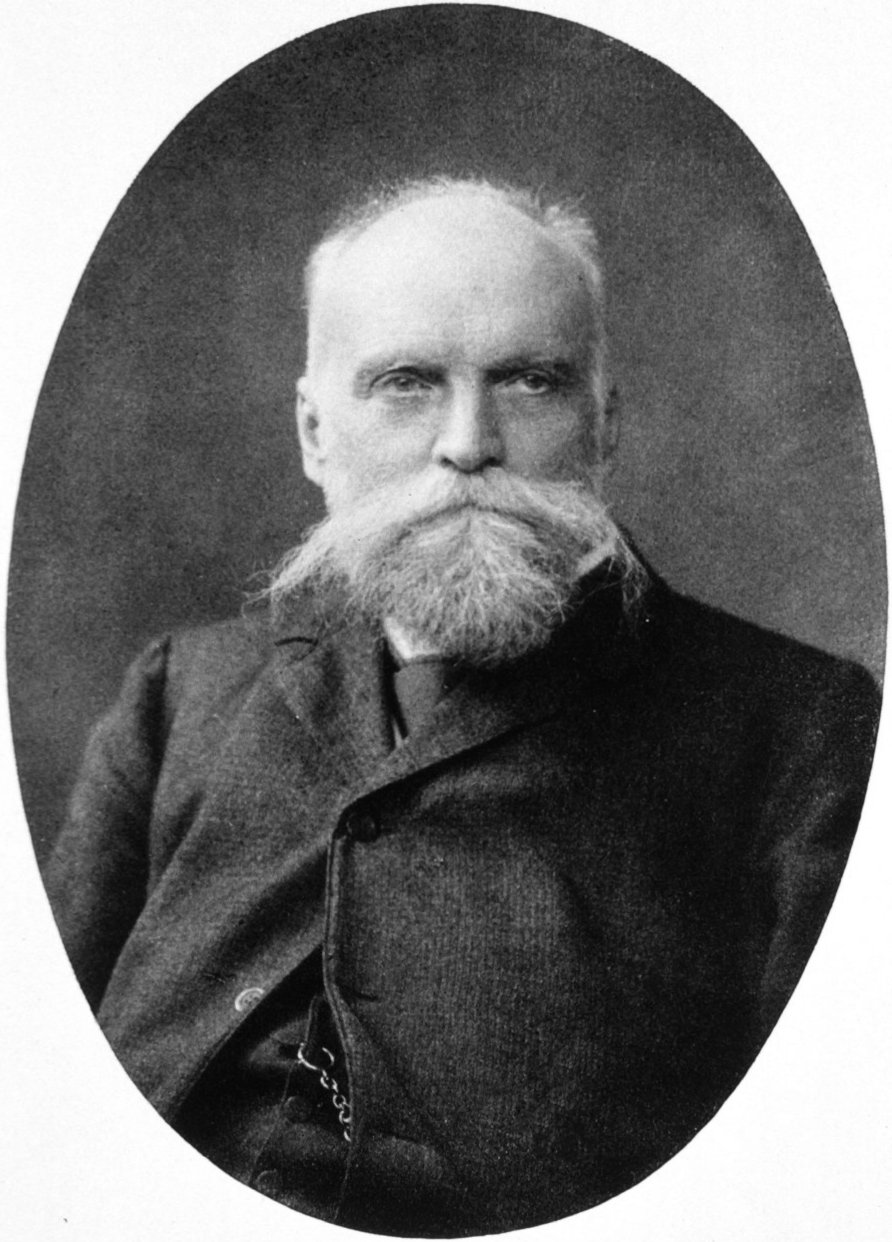
Hermann Schwartze

Hermann Hugo Rudolf Schwartze (7 September 1837 – 20 August 1910) was a German aurist, born at Neuhof in Pomerania and educated in Berlin and Würzburg. He settled in Halle, where he became assistant professor of otology at its university.

One of the founders of modern otology, Schwartze made a particular study of the anatomy of the ear and improved the methods of paracentesis on the tympanic membrane and of the opening of inflamed apophyses of the middle ear.

He wrote Praktische Beiträge zur Ohrenheilkunde (1864), Pathologische Anatomie des Ohrs (1878; English translation by J. O. Green, The Pathological Anatomy of the Ear, 1878), Lehrbuch der chirurgischen Krankheiten desOhrs (1885), and Grundriss der Otologie (1905). He was co-editor with Emil Berthold of the Handbuch der Ohrenheilkunde (1892–1893); and in 1864 was co-founder of the Archiv für Ohrenheilkunde with Adam Politzer and Anton von Troeltsch. This publication was the first journal in Germany dedicated to ear disorders.

== Terms ==
- Schwartze's operation—the opening of the mastoid cells with a hammer and chisel in disease of the middle ear.

Dorland's Medical Dictionary (1938)

- Schwartze's sign: a reddish-blue discoloration behind the tympanic membrane, occasionally seen in otosclerosis.
