= Phlebolith =

Small local calcification within a vein

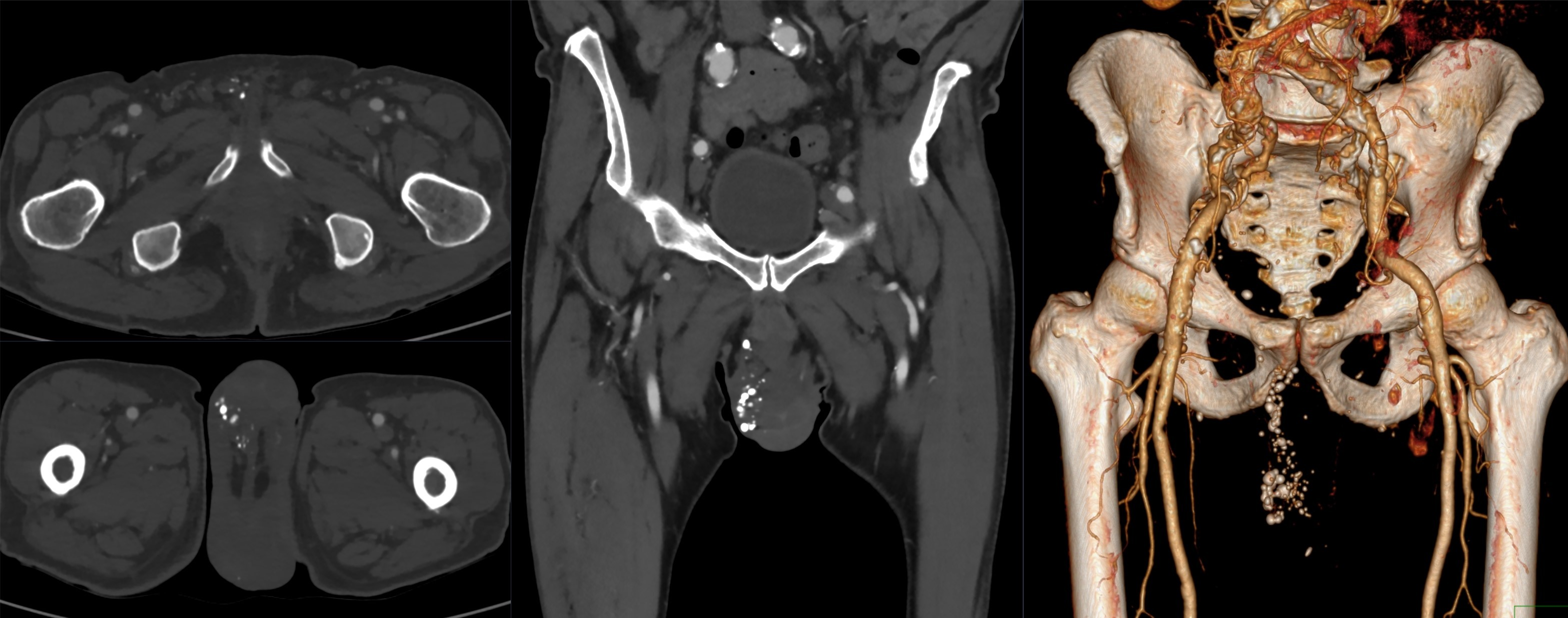
Phleboliths (seen as punctiform calcifications) in the scrotum of an individual with varicocoele.

A phlebolith is a small, focal, usually rounded, calcified thrombus within a vein. They are very common in the veins of the lower pelvis; however, phleboliths can also occur outside the pelvic region, including in the oral and maxillofacial (OMF) area. Phleboliths are often incidental findings and are most commonly detected on X-ray and CT imaging. They have distinct radiologic features that help distinguish them from other types of calcifications.

Phleboliths are frequently identified incidentally and usually present asymptomatically. However, their presence may indicate underlying vascular abnormalities that could warrant further investigation. Nevertheless, when a phlebolith is confirmed or considered the most likely diagnosis, treatment is generally not required, and other potential causes of symptoms should be investigated.

== Characteristics ==
Phleboliths are most commonly found in the pelvic region and secondarily found in the OMF area. Pelvic phleboliths are most frequently identified in adults over the age of 40, and their prevalence increases with age. In general, there is no significant difference in prevalence between genders; however, between the ages of 35 and 54, there may be a slightly higher frequency in females.

Cases in pediatric populations are rare and are more often identified in the OMF region, typically secondary to underlying vascular abnormalities.

== Pathophysiology ==
Phleboliths are thought to arise due to flow changes in venous structures secondary to structural abnormalities such as venous malformation and hemangiomas or vessel wall trauma, creating a nidus for thrombus formation, and are subsequently mineralized and enlarged. Injury to the vascular endothelium can disrupt the intimal layer, leading to thrombus formation as part of the healing process. Over time, this thrombus may mineralize, resulting in a calcified structure. These thrombi may become incorporated into the wall as fibromyxoid nodules or develop into phleboliths.

== Radiologic features ==
=== X-ray ===
On X-ray imaging, phleboliths present as focal calcifications, visualized as small, rounded, radio-opaque foci with a presence of central lucency. This feature demonstrates moderate sensitivity and high specificity.

=== Computed tomography (CT) ===
On CT imaging, phleboliths present as small, rounded, and hyper-dense foci. A characteristic comet-tail sign, consisting of a central area of calcification with a soft tissue tail representing a pelvic vein, can help diagnose phleboliths with moderate sensitivity and high specificity.

In the pelvis, the most common differential diagnosis to consider for focal calcifications are phleboliths versus ureteroliths. The comet-tail sign is more characteristic of phleboliths, whereas a rim sign is more typical of ureteroliths. Phleboliths also demonstrate lower Hounsfield unit (HU) values compared with ureteral calculi (160-350 HU). CT imaging fails to demonstrate a hypodense center of phleboliths that compares to the central lucency seen on X-ray. Therefore, the absence of central lucency on CT cannot reliably differentiate ureteroliths from phleboliths.

=== Magnetic resonance imaging (MRI) ===
Due to better soft tissue contrast, MRI is not frequently used to diagnose phleboliths, which are calcifications better visualized on X-ray and CT imaging. On MRI, phleboliths appear as hypointense foci across multiple MRI imaging sequences.

However, the presence of phleboliths is highly suggestive of venous malformations and hemangiomas, and MRI is often the preferred modality for evaluating these associated vascular anomalies.

== Clinical significance ==
Although phleboliths are mostly incidental findings and rarely produce any symptoms, their presence may suggest vascular abnormalities such as hemangiomas or vascular malformations. Up to 25% of phlebolith identified in patients have been associated with venous malformations.

Phleboliths can also pose a diagnostic challenge, particularly when differentiating them from other focal calcifications. For example, to differentiate phleboliths from sialoliths in the OMF area, "phleboliths are usually multiple and circular radio-opacities with a laminated morphology and a radiopaque or radiolucent center, while sialoliths are commonly uniform radiopaque and there is more often a single sialolith rather than multiple sialoliths." Differentiating ureteroliths from phleboliths can also be challenging, although imaging features such as the rim sign and comet-tail sign can help distinguish the two with high specificity, respectively.

Regarding management and treatment, phleboliths themselves typically do not resolve once calcification has occurred and are unlikely to disappear spontaneously or respond to treatments such as sclerotherapy. Therefore, management is usually directed toward the underlying vascular abnormality rather than the phleboliths themselves. When treatment is required, therapeutic options may include sclerotherapy to shrink the vascular lesion or surgical excision when clinically appropriate.
