= Enterolith =

Solid mineral mass formed in the gastrointestinal system

- Specialty: Gastroenterology

An enterolith is a mineral concretion or calculus formed anywhere in the gastrointestinal system. Enteroliths are uncommon and usually incidental findings but, once found, they require at a minimum watchful waiting. If there is evidence of complications, they must be removed. An enterolith may form around a nidus, a small foreign object such as a seed, pebble, or piece of twine that serves as an irritant. In this respect, an enterolith forms by a process similar to the creation of a pearl. An enterolith is not to be confused with a gastrolith, which helps digestion.

== In equines ==
Equine enteroliths are found by walking pastures or turning over manure compost piles to find small enteroliths, during necroscopy, and increasingly, during surgery for colic. Therefore, the incidence of asymptomatic enteroliths is unknown.

Equine enteroliths are typically smoothly spherical or tetrahedral, consist mostly of the mineral struvite (ammonium magnesium phosphate), and have concentric rings of mineral precipitated around a nidus.

Enteroliths in horses were reported widely in the 19th century, infrequently in the early 20th century, and now increasingly. They have also been reported in zebras: five in a zoo in California and one in a zoo in Wisconsin. Struvite enteroliths are associated with elevated pH and mineral concentrations in the lumen. In California, struvite enteroliths are associated also with a high proportion of alfalfa in the feed and less access to grass pasture. This association has been attributed to the cultivation of alfalfa on serpentine soils, resulting in high concentrations of magnesium in the alfalfa.

== In humans ==
In humans, enteroliths are rare and may be difficult to distinguish from gall stones. Their chemical composition is diverse, and rarely can a nidus be found. A differential diagnosis of an enterolith requires the enterolith, a normal gallbladder, and a diverticulum.

An enterolith typically forms within a diverticulum. An enterolith formed in a Meckel's diverticulum sometimes is known as a Meckel's enterolith. Improper use of magnesium oxide as a long-term laxative has been reported to cause enteroliths and/or medication bezoars.

Most enteroliths are not apparent and cause no complications. However, any complications that do occur are likely to be severe. Of these, bowel obstruction is most common, followed by ileus and perforation. Bowel obstruction and ileus typically occur when a large enterolith is expelled from a diverticulum into the lumen. Perforation typically occurs within the diverticulum.

On plain X-rays, the visibility of the enterolith depends on its calcium content. Calcium-rich stones usually demonstrate a radiodense rim and a relatively radioluscent core. Choleic acid stones are almost always radiolucent. They sometimes can be visualized on CT scans without contrast; presence of contrast in the lumen may reveal the enterolith as a void. Most often, they are visualized using ultrasound.

Although recent surveys of enterolith composition are lacking, one early review notes struvite (as in equines), calcium phosphate, and calcium carbonate and reports choleic acid. Deoxycholic acid and cholic acid have also been reported.

=== Treatment ===
In simple cases of obstruction, where there are no complications, a variety of non-surgical and surgical techniques are used to remove the enterolith. These include crushing the enterolith and milking it back to the stomach or forward to the colon, surgical removal via an uninvolved segment of the gastrointestinal tract, and resection of the involved segment.

== See also ==
- Acid-base physiology
- Bezoar
