= Omphalolith =

Growth in the navel

- Other names: umbolith, omphalith, navel stone, umbilical concretion
- Specialty: Dermatology, General Medicine
- Complications: Irritation, bleeding, infection
- Usual onset: Elderly
- Causes: Poor hygiene
- Risk factors: Age, obesity
- Differential diagnosis: Melanoma, keloids, endometriosis, dermatofibroma, cholesteatoma, foreign bodies, persistent omphalomesenteric duct.
- Treatment: Removal

An omphalolith, also known as a umbolith, omphalith, navel stone, omphalokeratolith, or umbilical concretion is a periumbilical mass that may form due to the accumulation of sebum and keratin. The colour is black or brown, and may be related to the skin type of the patient. It may be caused by poor hygiene, and may form in retracted navels in obese people. It is more common in the elderly and may persist for years.

Omphaloliths can be diagnosed by clinical examination and should be distinguished from metastatic malignancy, malignant melanoma, keloids, umbilical endometriosis, dermatofibroma, cholesteatoma, foreign bodies like terminal hairs (trichobezoar), and persistent omphalomesenteric duct. They may be complicated by irritation, erosions, bleeding, and infection. Removal can be accomplished by forceps, perhaps with a lubricant such as petroleum jelly.

== Etymology ==
The name was derived from the Greek words omphalos (ομφαλός) 'navel' and lithos (λίθος) 'stone'.
