= Rhinoscope =

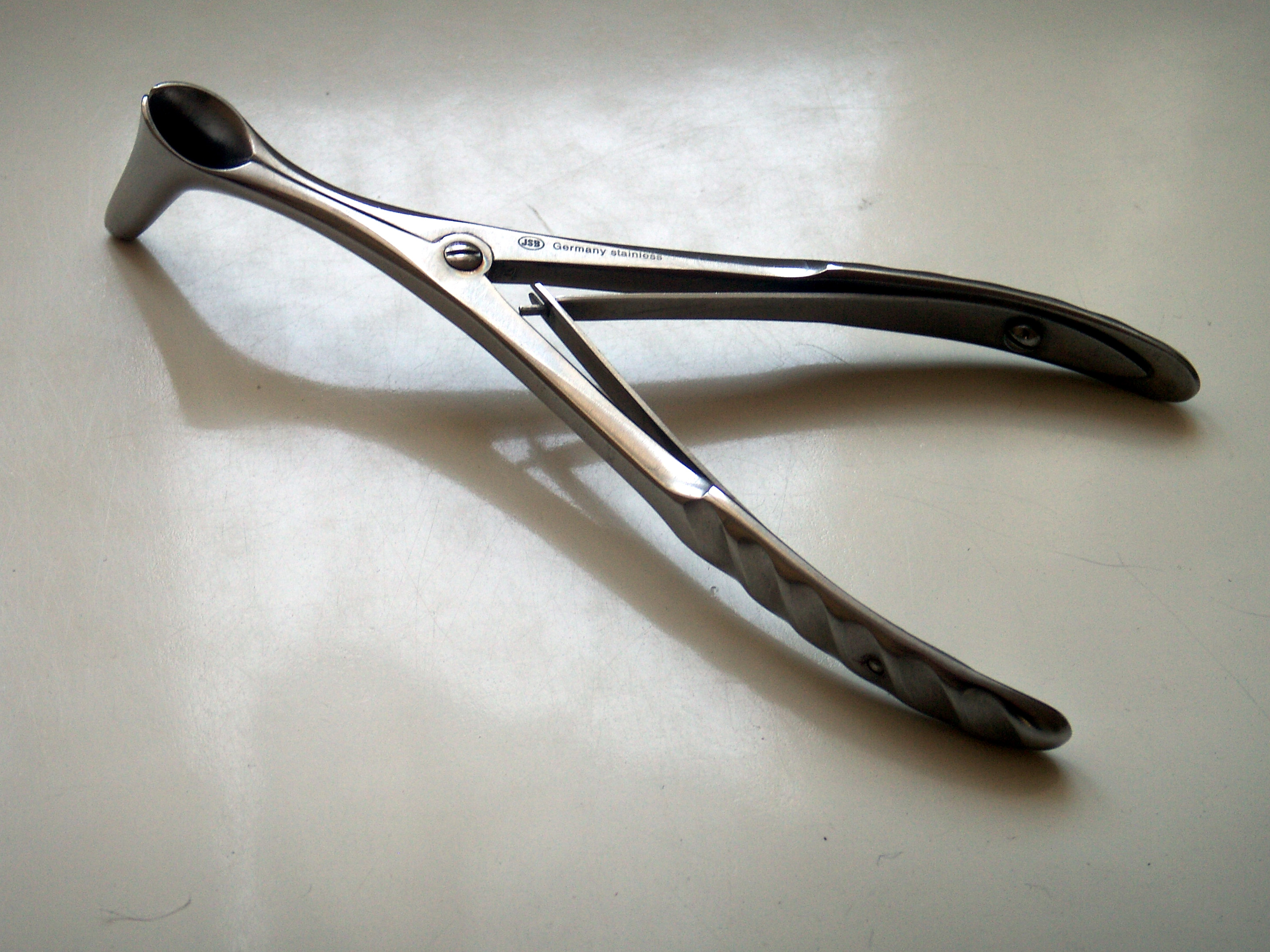
- Nasal speculum
- OPS-301 code: 1-612

A rhinoscope (or nasoscope) is a thin, tube-like instrument used to examine the inside of the nose. A rhinoscope has a light and a lens for viewing and may have a tool to remove tissue.

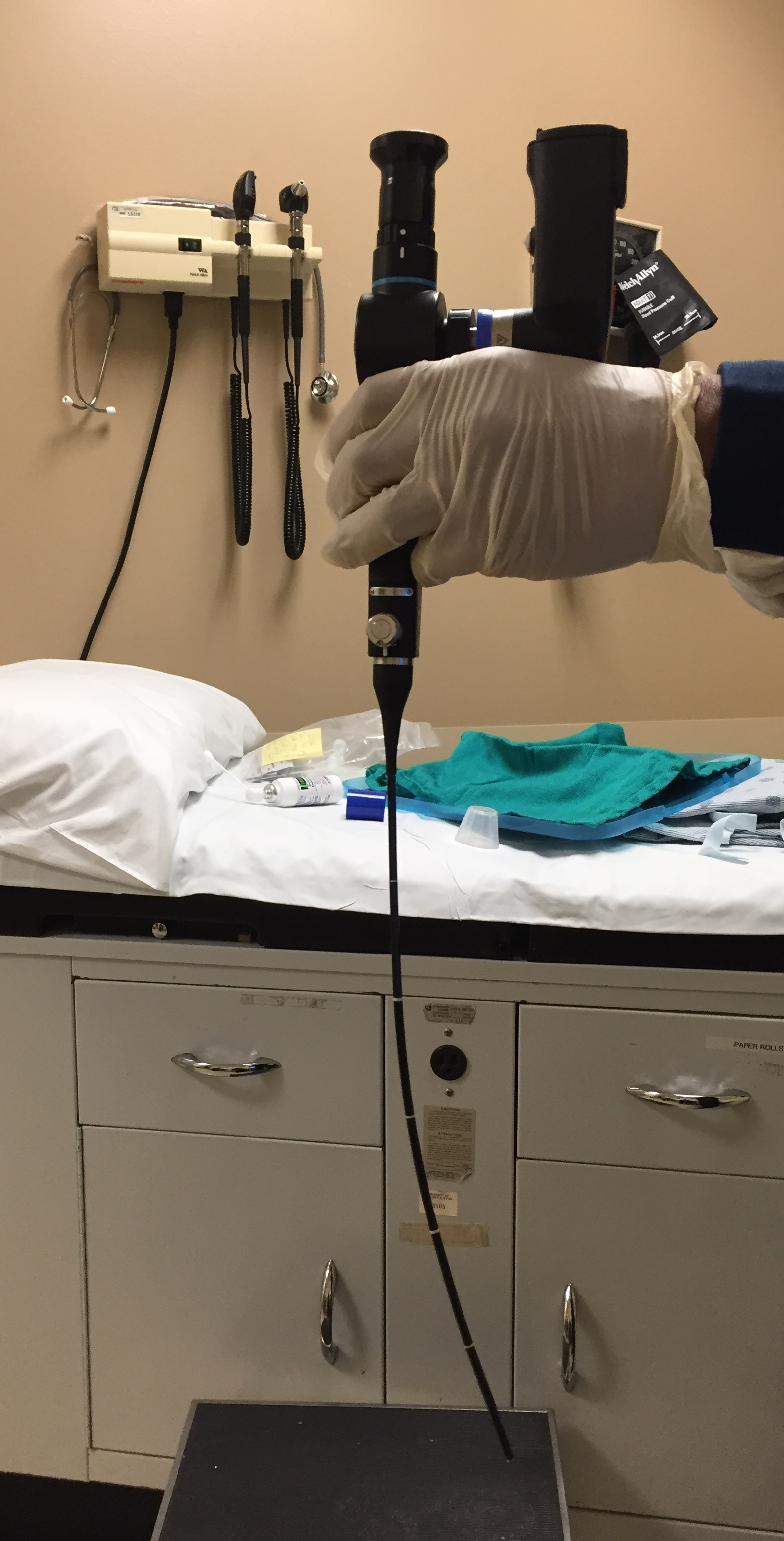
Endoscopic rhinoscope

== Types ==
Rhinoscopy is performed by two procedures.

- Anterior rhinoscopy using a nasal speculum
- Posterior rhinoscopy using an endoscopic rhinoscope

=== Anterior rhinoscopy ===
In anterior rhinoscopy, the rhinoscope is advanced through the nose to examine the nasal cavity.

=== Posterior rhinoscopy ===
In posterior rhinoscopy, the endoscope is advanced through the mouth to examine the back of the nasal cavity above the soft palate, and can be used to visualise the oropharynx below that.

Structures seen in posterior rhinoscopy: posterior border of nasal septum, fossa of Roosenmuller, eustachian tube opening and upper surface of soft palate.
