= Politzerization =

Procedure to inflate the middle ear while swallowing

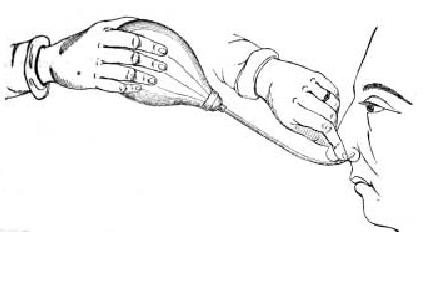
- The Politzer maneuver, original illustration of 1863
- Specialty: Otorhinolaryngology

Politzerization, also called the Politzer maneuver or method, is a medical procedure that involves inflating the middle ear by blowing air up the nose during the act of swallowing. It is often performed to reopen the Eustachian tube and equalise pressure in the middle ear.

The procedure was derived from a medical experiment first performed by Ádám Politzer of Vienna that involved studying the air movement through the Eustachian tube by connecting a manometer to the external auditory canal meatus and another manometer in the pharynx. His first results on the technique were published in 1861 and he introduced a pear-shaped rubber air-bag for performing the procedure in 1863, which came to be known as a Politzer bag. This system was far more practical and less difficult for the patient than catheterizing the Eustachian tube and brought fame to Politzer.

== Use in clinical devices ==
One device that utilizes Politzeration is the EarPopper, developed by Shlomo Silman, Ph.D., professor of hearing sciences and audiology at Brooklyn College, CUNY, and otolaryngologist Daniel Arick, M.D. The EarPopper is a hand-held, battery-operated device that delivers controlled air flow through the nostril and can be used by the patient without medical supervision. Clinical studies have demonstrated the device's efficacy in the treatment of ear blockage caused by Eustachian tube dysfunction and otitis media with effusion.
