= Voluntary tubal opening =

Equalization technique used in diving

Real-time MRI demonstrating swallowing of pineapple juice. The LVP and TVP contract, raising the velum, sealing off the nasopharynx from the oropharynx and directing the bolus into the esophagus. In the process, the cartilaginous valve region of the auditory tubes are dilated and the middle ear is equalised with the ambient pressure of the nasopharynx.

Voluntary tubal opening (VTO; French: Béance tubaire volontaire or BTV), also known as hand-free equalisation or the Delonca maneuver, is an equalization technique used in scuba diving and freediving involving voluntary control of the levator and tensor veli palatini muscles.

First described by Georges Delonca in 1970, the technique involves voluntarily opening the Eustachian tubes, as occurs involuntarily during yawning and swallowing, however whilst the mouth is closed during diving.

Requiring muscle isolation, it is considered more advanced than Valsalva or Frenzel equalisation. VTO does not use positive pressure so carries less risk of barotrauma from over pressurisation of the middle ear.

A common misconception is that only the TVP muscles are involved with VTO, however it is the combined action of the LVP and TVP that are known to articulate the process.

== History ==
The technique was first described by Georges Delonca in a 1970 article in the Bulletin of the French Society of Underwater and Hyperbaric Physiology and Medicine. In the context of diving, it is often called the Delonca maneuver.

== Physiology ==
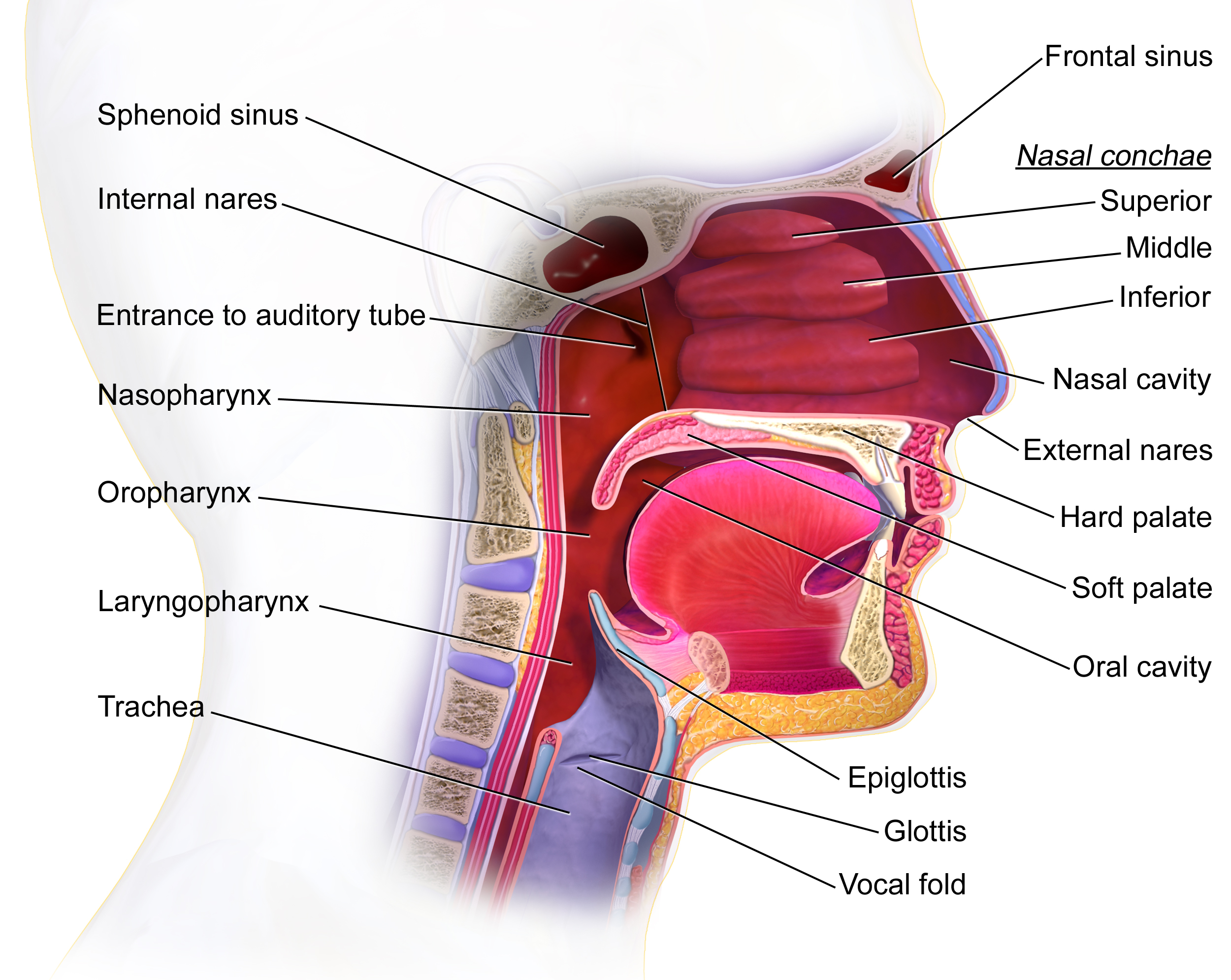
Sagittal view of the mouth and pharynx, showing the soft palate and the opening of the auditory/Eustachian tube.

BTV is defined as a voluntary opening of the auditory tubes. The method requires voluntary control of the levator and tensor veli palatine muscles, which leads to opening of the auditory tubes. With the auditory tubes open, the pressure of the middle ear cavity can equalise with the ambient pressure of the pharynx, which is in turn in equilibrium with external water pressure. Contraction of the TVP muscles is essential for auditory tube opening.

A 2012 study using sonotubometry and endoscopy to measure Eustachian tube opening in 17 participants whilst yawning and swallowing found that 6 subjects did not demonstrate ET opening during swallowing whilst only 4 did not demonstrate ET opening whilst yawning. The average dilation time for swallowing was 0.44 seconds with an intensity of 9.2 dB and 2.03 at 10.1 dB for yawning. This corroborates the findings of other studies that not every instance of yawing or swallowing results in ET opening.

The pronunciation of the velar consonants (for example /k/ and /g/) involves the isolated action of the LVT without TVP activation. Contraction of the LVP elevates the palate and medially rotates the posterior cushion (tortus tubaris), which dilates the posteromedial wall of the ET, but does not cause tubal opening. TVP contraction subsequently dilates the anterolateral wall to produce a rounding of the valve to the fully dilated position.

=== During swallowing ===
During swallowing, the actions of the levator palatini (pharyngeal plexus—IX, X), tensor palatini (Vc) and salpingopharyngeus (pharyngeal plexus—IX, X) in the closure of the nasopharynx and elevation of the pharynx opens the auditory tube, which equalises the pressure between the nasopharynx and the middle ear. This does not contribute to swallowing, but happens as a consequence of it. Whilst swallowing the opening of the auditory/Eustachian tubes is involuntary, but divers can learn to control the process via muscle isolation training.

== Pathology ==
In pathology, involuntary opening of the auditory tubes can sometimes lead to Patulous Eustachian tube. It is a rare condition, affecting only 0.3% to 6.6% of the population. The primary symptom of this condition is autophony, a phenomenon characterized by hearing one's own internal sounds such as voice, breathing and heartbeat.

== See also ==
- Ear clearing
- Valsalva maneuver
- Frenzel maneuver
