= Human physiology of underwater diving =

Influences of the underwater environment on the physiology of human divers

Human physiology of underwater diving is the physiological influences of the underwater environment on the human ambient pressure diver, and adaptations to operating underwater, both during breath-hold dives and while breathing at ambient pressure from a suitable breathing gas supply. It, therefore, includes the range of physiological effects generally limited to human ambient pressure divers either freediving or using underwater breathing apparatus. Several factors influence the diver, including immersion, exposure to the water, the limitations of breath-hold endurance, variations in ambient pressure, the effects of breathing gases at raised ambient pressure, effects caused by the use of breathing apparatus, and sensory impairment. All of these may affect diver performance and safety.

Immersion affects fluid balance, circulation and work of breathing. Exposure to cold water can result in the harmful cold shock response, the helpful diving reflex and excessive loss of body heat. Breath-hold duration is limited by oxygen reserves, the response to raised carbon dioxide levels, and the risk of hypoxic blackout, which has a high associated risk of drowning.

Large or sudden changes in ambient pressure have the potential for injury known as barotrauma. Breathing under pressure involves several effects. Metabolically inactive gases are absorbed by the tissues and may have narcotic or other undesirable effects, and must be released slowly to avoid the formation of bubbles during decompression. Metabolically active gases have a greater effect in proportion to their concentration, which is proportional to their partial pressure, which for contaminants is increased in proportion to absolute ambient pressure.

Work of breathing is increased by increased density of the breathing gas, artifacts of the breathing apparatus, and hydrostatic pressure variations due to posture in the water. The underwater environment also affects sensory input, which can impact on safety and the ability to function effectively at depth.

== Immersion ==
Immersion of the human body in water has effects on the circulation, renal system and fluid balance, and breathing, which are caused by the external hydrostatic pressure of the water providing support against the internal hydrostatic pressure of the blood. This causes a blood shift from the extravascular tissues of the limbs into the chest cavity, and fluid losses known as immersion diuresis compensate for the blood shift in hydrated subjects soon after immersion. Hydrostatic pressure on the body due to head out immersion causes negative pressure breathing which contributes to the blood shift.

The blood shift causes an increased respiratory and cardiac workload. Stroke volume is not greatly affected by immersion or variation in ambient pressure but slowed heartbeat reduces the overall cardiac output, particularly due to the diving reflex in breath-hold diving. Lung volume decreases in the upright position due to cranial displacement of the abdomen due to hydrostatic pressure, and resistance to air flow in the airways increases significantly because of the decrease in lung volume. There appears to be a connection between pulmonary edema and increased pulmonary blood flow and pressure which results in capillary engorgement. This may occur during higher intensity exercise while immersed or submersed. Negative static lung load due to hydrostatic pressure difference between ambient pressure on the chest and breathing gas supply pressure can cause a reduction in compliance of the soft lung tissues leading to increased work of breathing.

== Exposure ==
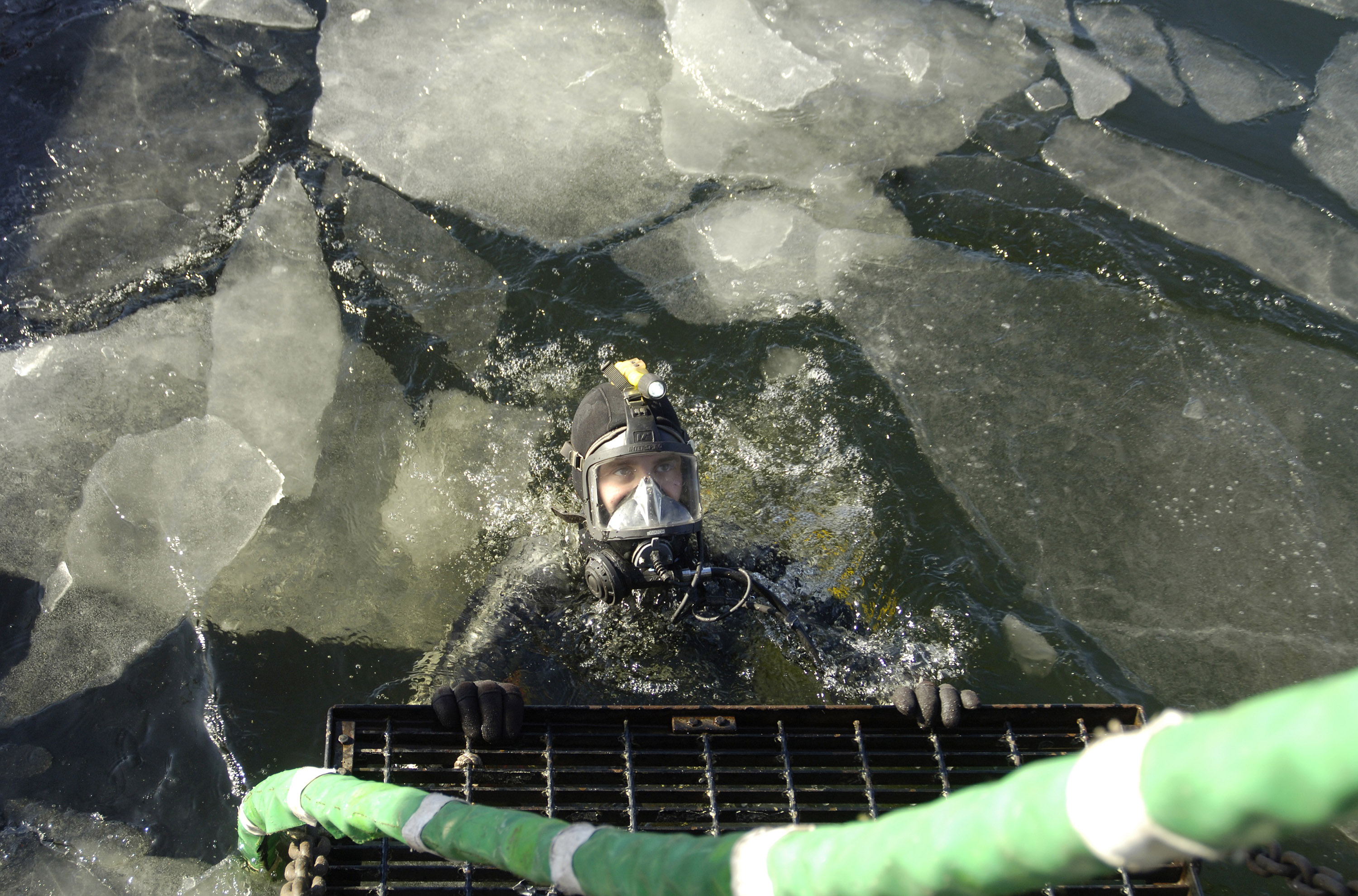
Diving in cold water requires effective insulation to prevent rapid heat loss.

Cold shock response is the physiological response of organisms to sudden cold, especially cold water, and is a common cause of death from immersion in very cold water, such as by falling through thin ice. The immediate shock of the cold causes involuntary inhalation, which if underwater can result in drowning. The cold water can also cause heart attack due to vasoconstriction; the heart has to work harder to pump the same volume of blood throughout the body, and for people with heart disease, this additional workload can cause the heart to go into arrest. A person who survives the initial minute of trauma after falling into icy water can survive for at least thirty minutes provided they don't drown. However, the ability to perform useful work like staying afloat declines substantially after ten minutes as the body protectively cuts off blood flow to "non-essential" muscles.

The diving reflex is a response to immersion that overrides the basic homeostatic reflexes, and which is found in all air-breathing vertebrates. It optimizes respiration by preferentially distributing oxygen stores to the heart and brain which allows staying underwater for extended periods of time. It is exhibited strongly in aquatic mammals (seals, otters, dolphins, muskrats), but exists in other mammals, including humans. Diving birds, such as penguins, have a similar diving reflex. The diving reflex is triggered specifically by chilling the face and breath-hold. The most noticeable effects are on the cardiovascular system, which displays peripheral vasoconstriction, slowed pulse rate, redirection of blood to the vital organs to conserve oxygen, release of red blood cells stored in the spleen, and, in humans, heart rhythm irregularities. Aquatic mammals have evolved physiological adaptations to conserve oxygen during submersion, but the apnea, bradycardia, and vasoconstriction are shared with terrestrial mammals as a neural response.

Hypothermia is reduced body temperature that happens when a body dissipates more heat than it absorbs and produces. Clinical hypothermia occurs when the core temperature drops below 35 °C (95 °F). Heat loss is a major limitation to swimming or diving in cold water. The reduction in finger dexterity due to pain or numbness decreases general safety and work capacity, which consequently increases the risk of other injuries. Reduced capacity for rational decision making increases risk due to other hazards, and loss of strength in chilled muscles also affects the capacity to manage both routine and emergency situations. Low tissue temperatures and reduced peripheral perfusion affect inert gas solubility and the rate of ingassing and outgassing, thereby affecting decompression stress and risk. Body heat is lost much more quickly in water than in air, so water temperatures that would be quite reasonable as outdoor air temperatures can lead to hypothermia in inadequately protected divers, although it is not often the direct clinical cause of death.

Persistent exposure of the external auditory canal to cold water can induce the growth of exostoses.

Non-freezing cold injury (NFCI) is a form of localised cold injury in which there is no freeze–thaw damage. The tissue damage is caused by sustained exposure to low temperature without actual freezing. NFCI is caused by microvascular endothelial damage, stasis and vascular occlusion and is characterised by peripheral neuropathy. NFCI generally affects the hands or feet during exposure to temperatures just above freezing, often wet.

The thermal status of the diver has a significant influence on decompression stress and risk, and from a safety point of view this is more important than thermal comfort. Ingassing while warm is faster than when cold, as is outgassing, due to differences in perfusion in response to temperature perception, which is mostly sensed in superficial tissues. Maintaining warmth for comfort during the ingassing phase of a dive can cause relatively high tissue gas loading, and getting cold during decompression can slow the elimination of gas due to reduced perfusion of the chilled tissues, and possibly also due to the higher solubility of the gas in chilled tissues.

== Breath-hold limitations ==
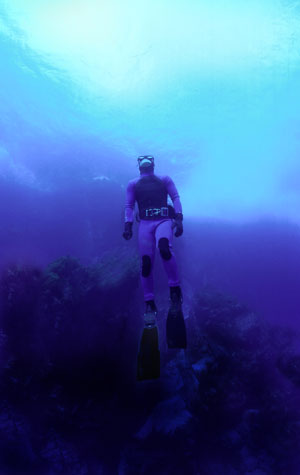
Latent hypoxia hits on ascent.

Breath-hold diving by an air-breathing animal is limited by the physiological capacity to perform the dive on the oxygen available until it returns to a source of fresh breathing gas, usually the air at the surface. When this internal oxygen supply is depleted, the animal suffers an increasing urge to breathe caused by a buildup of carbon dioxide in the circulation, followed by loss of consciousness due to central nervous system hypoxia. If this occurs underwater, it will drown. Breath-hold diving depth is limited in animals when the volume of rigid walled internal air spaces is occupied by all of the compressed gas of the breath and the soft spaces have collapsed under external pressure. Animals that can dive deeply have internal air spaces that can extensively collapse without harm, and may actively exhale before diving to avoid absorption of inert gas during the dive.

Breath-hold blackout is a loss of consciousness caused by cerebral hypoxia towards the end of a breath-hold dive, when the swimmer does not necessarily experience an urgent need to breathe and has no other obvious medical condition that might have caused it. It can be provoked by hyperventilating just before a dive, or as a consequence of the pressure reduction on ascent, or a combination of these. Victims are often established practitioners of breath-hold diving, are fit, strong swimmers and have not experienced problems before.

Divers and swimmers who blackout or grey out underwater during a dive will usually drown unless rescued and resuscitated within a short time. Freediving blackout has a high fatality rate, and mostly involves males younger than 40 years, but is generally avoidable. Risk cannot be quantified, but is clearly increased by any level of hyperventilation.

Freediving blackout can occur on any dive profile: at constant depth, on an ascent from depth, or at the surface following ascent from depth and may be described by a number of terms depending on the dive profile and depth at which consciousness is lost. Blackout during a shallow dive differs from blackout during ascent from a deep dive in that deep water blackout is precipitated by depressurisation on ascent from depth while shallow water blackout is a consequence of hypocapnia following hyperventilation.

Oxygen-Haemoglobin dissociation curves

The minimum tissue and venous partial pressure of oxygen which will maintain consciousness is about 20 millimetres of mercury (27 mbar). This is equivalent to approximately 30 millimetres of mercury (40 mbar) in the lungs. Approximately 46 ml/min oxygen is required for brain function. This equates to a minimum arterial partial pressure of oxygen (${P_{a_{O_2}}}$) of 29 millimetres of mercury (39 mbar) at 868 ml/min cerebral flow.

Hyperventilation depletes the blood of carbon dioxide (hypocapnia), which causes respiratory alkalosis (increased pH), and causes a leftward shift in the oxygen–hemoglobin dissociation curve. This results in a lower venous partial pressure of oxygen, which worsens hypoxia. A normally ventilated breath-hold usually breaks (from CO_{2}) with over 90% saturation which is far from hypoxia. Hypoxia produces a respiratory drive but not as strong as the hypercapnic respiratory drive. This has been studied in altitude medicine, where hypoxia occurs without hypercapnia due to the low ambient pressure. The balance between the hypercapnic and hypoxic respiratory drives has genetic variability and can be modified by hypoxic training. These variations imply that predictive risk cannot be reliably estimated, but pre-dive hyperventilation carries definite risks.

There are three different mechanisms behind blackouts in freediving:

Duration-induced hypoxia occurs when the breath is held long enough for metabolic activity to reduce the oxygen partial pressure sufficiently to cause loss of consciousness. This is accelerated by exertion, which uses oxygen faster or hyperventilation, which reduces the carbon dioxide level in the blood which in turn may increase the oxygen-haemoglobin affinity thus reducing availability of oxygen to brain tissue towards the end of the dive (Bohr effect), and suppress the urge to breathe, making it easier to hold the breath to the point of blackout. This can happen at any depth.

Ischaemic hypoxia is caused by reduced blood flow to the brain arising from cerebral vasoconstriction brought on by low carbon dioxide following hyperventilation, or increased pressure on the heart as a consequence of glossopharangeal insufflation (lung packing) which can reduce blood circulation in general, or both. If the brain used more oxygen than is available in the blood supply, the cerebral oxygen partial pressure may drop below the level required to sustain consciousness. This type of blackout is likely to occur early in the dive.

Ascent-induced hypoxia is caused by a drop in oxygen partial pressure as ambient pressure is reduced on ascent. The oxygen partial pressure at depth, under pressure, may be sufficient to maintain consciousness but only at that depth and not at the reduced pressures in the shallower waters above or at the surface.

The mechanism for blackout on ascent differs from hyperventilation induced hypocapnia expedited blackouts and does not necessarily follow hyperventilation. However, hyperventilation will exacerbate the risk and there is no clear line between them. Shallow water blackouts can happen in extremely shallow water, even on dry land following hyperventilation and apnoea but the effect becomes much more dangerous in the ascent stage of a deep freedive. There is considerable confusion surrounding the terms shallow and deep water blackout and they have been used to refer to different things, or been used interchangeably, in different water sports circles. For example, the term shallow water blackout has been used to describe blackout on ascent because the blackout usually occurs when the diver ascends to a shallow depth.

=== Physiological responses to deep breath-hold diving ===
Recent research (2021) on freedivers has shown cerebral haemodynamic changes characteristic of apnoeic diving in specialist diving mammals. Some divers also showed significant increases of venous blood volumes towards the end of dives. In some cases measured arterial oxygen saturation values showed considerable arterial deoxygenation, with an extreme value of 25%. Heart rate changes similar to diving mammals in magnitude, and patterns of change were recorded, and changes in cardiac waveform at heart rates less than 40 beats per minute were linked to changes suggesting reduction in vascular compliance.

== Ambient pressure changes ==
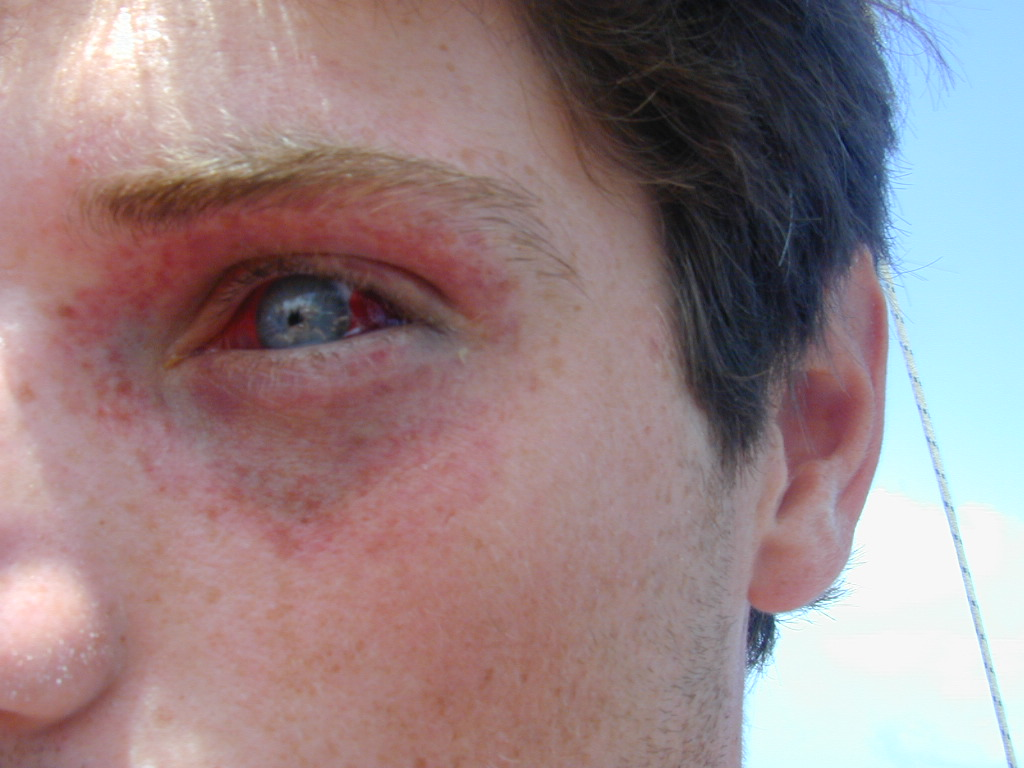
Mild barotrauma to a diver caused by mask squeeze

There are two components to the ambient pressure acting on the diver: the atmospheric pressure and the water (hydrostatic) pressure. A descent of 10 metres (33 feet) in water increases the ambient pressure by an amount approximately equal to the pressure of the atmosphere at sea level. So, a descent from the surface to 10 metres (33 feet) underwater results in a doubling of the pressure on the diver. This pressure change will reduce the volume of a gas filled space by half. Boyle's law describes the relationship between the volume of the gas space and the pressure in the gas.

Barotrauma is physical damage to body tissues caused by a difference in pressure between a gas space inside, or in contact with the body, and the surrounding gas or fluid. It typically occurs when the organism is exposed to a significant change in ambient pressure, such as when a diver ascends or descends. When diving, the pressure differences which cause the barotrauma are changes in hydrostatic pressure:

The initial damage is usually due to over-stretching the tissues in tension or shear, either directly by expansion of the gas in the closed space, or by pressure difference hydrostatically transmitted through the tissue. Tissue rupture may be complicated by the introduction of gas into the local tissue or circulation through the initial trauma site, which can cause blockage of circulation at distant sites, or interfere with normal function of an organ by its presence. Barotrauma generally manifests as sinus or middle ear effects, decompression sickness (DCS), lung overpressure injuries, and injuries resulting from external squeezes.

Barotraumas of descent are caused by preventing the free change of volume of the gas in a closed space in contact with the diver, resulting in a pressure difference between the tissues and the gas space, and the unbalanced force due to this pressure difference causes deformation of the tissues resulting in cell rupture.

Barotraumas of ascent are also caused when the free change of volume of the gas in a closed space in contact with the diver is prevented. In this case the pressure difference causes a resultant tension in the surrounding tissues which exceeds their tensile strength. Besides tissue rupture, the overpressure may cause ingress of gases into the tissues and further afield through the circulatory system. This pulmonary barotrauma (PBt) of ascent is also known as pulmonary over-inflation syndrome (POIS), lung over-pressure injury (LOP) and burst lung. Consequent injuries may include arterial gas embolism, pneumothorax, mediastinal, interstitial and subcutaneous emphysemas, not usually all at the same time.

Breathing gas at depth from underwater breathing apparatus results in the lungs containing gas at a higher pressure than atmospheric pressure. So a free-diver can dive to 10 metres (33 feet) and safely ascend without exhaling, because the gas in the lungs had been inhaled at atmospheric pressure, whereas a diver who deeply inhales at 10 metres and ascends without exhaling has lungs containing twice the amount of gas at atmospheric pressure and is very likely to suffer life-threatening lung damage.

Explosive decompression of a hyperbaric environment can produce severe barotrauma, followed by severe decompression bubble formation and other related injury. The Byford Dolphin incident is an example.

Compression arthralgia is pain in the joints caused by exposure to high ambient pressure at a relatively high rate of compression. It has been recorded as deep aching pain in the knees, shoulders, fingers, back, hips, neck and ribs. Pain may be sudden and intense in onset and may be accompanied by a feeling of roughness in the joints. Onset commonly occurs around 60 msw (meters of sea water), and symptoms are variable depending on depth, compression rate and personal susceptibility. Intensity increases with depth and may be aggravated by exercise. Compression arthralgia is generally a problem of deep diving, particularly deep saturation diving, where at sufficient depth even slow compression may produce symptoms. Peter B. Bennett et al. showed that the use of trimix could reduce the symptoms. It resolves without long term consequences on decompression.

== Breathing under pressure ==
Provision of breathing gas at ambient pressure can greatly prolong the duration of a dive, but there are other problems that may result from this technological solution. Absorption of metabolically inert gases is increased as a function of time and pressure, and these may both produce undesirable effects immediately, as a consequence of their presence in the dissolved state, such as nitrogen narcosis and high pressure nervous syndrome, or cause problems when coming out of solution within the tissues during decompression.

Other problems arise when the concentration of metabolically active gases is increased. These range from the toxic effects of oxygen at high partial pressure, through buildup of carbon dioxide due to excessive work of breathing and increased dead space, to the exacerbation of the toxic effects of contaminants in the breathing gas due to the increased concentration at high pressures, and include effects on the control of ventilation for maintaining homeostasis.

=== Metabolically inert components of the breathing gas ===
==== Absorption and release of inert gases ====
One of these problems is that inert components of the breathing gas are dissolved in the blood and transported to the other tissues at higher concentrations under pressure, and when the pressure is reduced, if the concentration is high enough, this gas may form bubbles in the tissues, including the venous blood, which may cause the injury known as decompression sickness, or "the bends". This problem may be managed by decompressing slowly enough to allow the gas to be eliminated while still dissolved, and eliminating those bubbles which do form while they are still small and few enough not to produce symptoms.

The physiology of decompression involves a complex interaction of gas solubility, partial pressures and concentration gradients, diffusion, bulk transport and bubble mechanics in living tissues. Gas is breathed at ambient pressure, and some of this gas dissolves into the blood and other fluids. Inert gas continues to be taken up until the gas dissolved in the tissues is in a state of equilibrium with the gas in the lungs, (see: "Saturation diving"), or the ambient pressure is reduced until the inert gases dissolved in the tissues are at a higher concentration than the equilibrium state, and start diffusing out again.

The absorption of gases in liquids depends on the solubility of the specific gas in the specific liquid, the concentration of gas, customarily measured by partial pressure, and temperature. In the study of decompression theory the behaviour of gases dissolved in the tissues is investigated and modeled for variations of pressure over time. Once dissolved, distribution of the dissolved gas may be by diffusion, where there is no bulk flow of the solvent, or by perfusion where the solvent (blood) is circulated around the diver's body, where gas can diffuse to local regions of lower concentration. Given sufficient time at a specific partial pressure in the breathing gas, the concentration in the tissues will stabilise, or saturate, at a rate depending on the solubility, diffusion rate and perfusion. If the concentration of the inert gas in the breathing gas is reduced below that of any of the tissues, there will be a tendency for gas to return from the tissues to the breathing gas. This is known as outgassing, and occurs during decompression, when the reduction in ambient pressure or a change of breathing gas reduces the partial pressure of the inert gas in the lungs.

The combined concentrations of gases in any given tissue will depend on the history of pressure and gas composition. Under equilibrium conditions, the total concentration of dissolved gases will be less than the ambient pressure, as oxygen is metabolised in the tissues, and the carbon dioxide produced is much more soluble. However, during a reduction in ambient pressure, the rate of pressure reduction may exceed the rate at which gas can be eliminated by diffusion and perfusion, and if the concentration gets too high, it may reach a stage where bubble formation can occur in the supersaturated tissues. When the pressure of gases in a bubble exceed the combined external pressures of ambient pressure and the surface tension from the bubble - liquid interface, the bubbles will grow, and this growth can cause damage to tissues. Symptoms caused by this damage are known as Decompression sickness.

The actual rates of diffusion and perfusion, and the solubility of gases in specific tissues are not generally known, and vary considerably. However mathematical models have been proposed which approximate the real situation to a greater or lesser extent, and these models are used to predict whether symptomatic bubble formation is likely to occur for a given pressure exposure profile.

==== Inert gas narcosis ====
Except for helium and possibly neon, all gases that can be breathed have a narcotic effect under pressure, although widely varying in degree. Narcosis produces a state similar to drunkenness (alcohol intoxication), or nitrous oxide inhalation. It can occur during shallow dives, but does not usually become noticeable at depths less than about 30 meters (100 ft).

The effect is consistently greater for gases with a higher lipid solubility, and there is good evidence that the two properties are mechanistically related. As depth increases, the mental impairment may become hazardous. Divers can learn to cope with some of the effects of narcosis, but it is impossible to develop a tolerance. Narcosis affects all divers, although susceptibility varies widely from dive to dive, and between individuals.

Narcosis appears to be completely reversed in a few minutes by ascending to a shallower depth, with no long-term effects. Thus narcosis while diving in open water rarely develops into a serious problem as long as the divers are aware of its symptoms, and are able to ascend to manage it. Due to its perception-altering effects, the onset of narcosis may be hard to recognize. At its most benign, narcosis results in relief of anxiety – a feeling of tranquility and mastery of the environment. These effects are essentially identical to various concentrations of nitrous oxide. They also resemble (though not as closely) the effects of alcohol or cannabis and the familiar benzodiazepine drugs such as diazepam and alprazolam. Such effects are not harmful unless they cause some immediate danger to go unrecognized and unaddressed. Once stabilized, the effects generally remain the same at a given depth, only worsening if the diver ventures deeper.

The most dangerous aspects of narcosis are the impairment of judgement, multi-tasking and coordination, and the loss of decision-making ability and focus. Other effects include vertigo and visual or auditory disturbances. The syndrome may cause exhilaration, giddiness, extreme anxiety, depression, or paranoia, depending on the individual diver and the diver's medical or personal history. When more serious, the diver may feel overconfident, disregarding normal safe diving practices. Slowed mental activity, as indicated by increased reaction time and increased errors in cognitive function, are effects which increase the risk of a diver mismanaging an incident. Narcosis reduces both the perception of cold discomfort and shivering and thereby affects the production of body heat and consequently allows a faster drop in the core temperature in cold water, with reduced awareness of the developing problem.

The management of narcosis is simply to ascend to shallower depths; the effects then disappear within minutes. In the event of complications or other conditions being present, ascending is always the correct initial response. Should problems remain, then it is necessary to abort the dive. The decompression schedule can still be followed unless other conditions require emergency assistance.

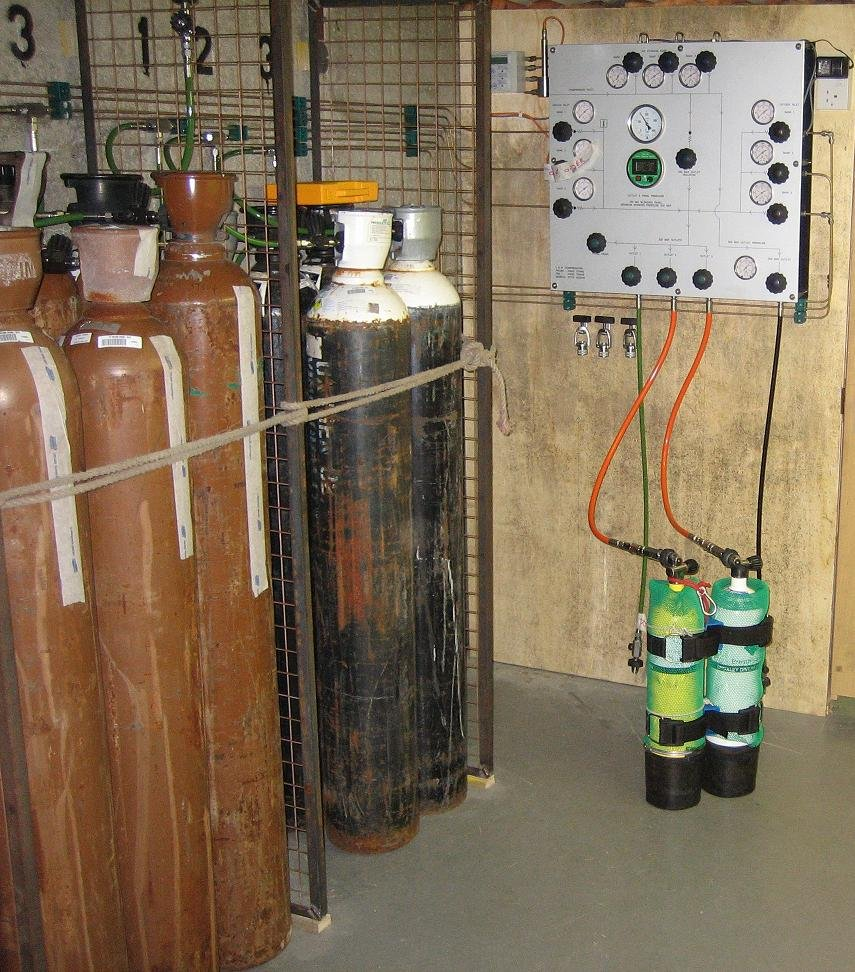
Narcosis while deep diving is prevented by breathing a gas mixture containing helium. Helium is stored in brown cylinders.

The most straightforward way to avoid nitrogen narcosis is for a diver to limit the depth of dives. Since narcosis becomes more severe as depth increases, a diver keeping to shallower depths can avoid serious narcosis. Most recreational diver certification agencies will only certify basic divers to depths of 18 m (60 ft), and at these depths narcosis does not present a significant risk. Further training is normally required for certification up to 30 m (100 ft) on air, and this training includes a discussion of narcosis, its effects, and management. Some diver training agencies offer specialized training to prepare recreational divers to go to depths of 40 m (130 ft), often consisting of further theory and some practice in deep dives under close supervision. Scuba organizations that train for diving beyond recreational depths, may forbid diving with gases that cause too much narcosis at depth in the average diver, and strongly encourage the use of other breathing gas mixes containing helium in place of some or all of the nitrogen in air – such as trimix and heliox – because helium has no narcotic effect. The use of these gases forms part of technical diving and requires further training and certification. Commercial surface supplied diving may routinely reach depths of 50 metres on air, but the diver is monitored from the surface and the airway is protected by a full-face mask or helmet.

Tests have shown that all divers are affected by nitrogen narcosis, though some experience lesser effects than others. Even though it is possible that some divers can manage better than others because of learning to cope with the subjective impairment, the underlying behavioral effects remain. These effects are particularly dangerous because a diver may feel they are not experiencing narcosis, yet still be affected by it.

==== High-pressure nervous syndrome ====
High-pressure nervous syndrome (HPNS) is a neurological and physiological diving disorder that results when a diver descends below about 500 feet (150 m) using a breathing gas containing helium. The effects experienced, and the severity of those effects, depend on the rate of descent, the depth and percentage of helium.

Symptoms of HPNS include tremors, myoclonic jerking, somnolence, EEG changes, visual disturbance, nausea, dizziness, and decreased mental performance. HPNS has two components, one resulting from the speed of compression and the other from the absolute pressure. The compression effects may occur when descending below 500 feet (150 m) at rates greater than a few metres per minute, but reduce within a few hours once the pressure has stabilised. The effects from depth become significant at depths exceeding 1,000 feet (300 m) and remain regardless of the time spent at that depth. The susceptibility of divers to HPNS varies considerably depending on the individual, but has little variation between different dives by the same diver.

It is likely that HPNS cannot be entirely prevented but there are effective methods to delay or change the development of the symptoms. Slow rates of compression or adding stops to the compression have been found to prevent large initial decrements in performance, while the inclusion of other gases in the helium–oxygen mixture, such as nitrogen or hydrogen suppresses the neurological effects.

=== Hyperbaric gas toxicity ===
The human physiology is evolved to suit atmospheric pressure conditions near sea level. Atmospheric gases at significantly greater pressures can have toxic effects which vary with the gas and its partial pressure, and the toxic effects of contaminants of the breathing gas are a function of their concentration, which is proportional to partial pressure, and therefore depth.

==== Oxygen toxicity ====
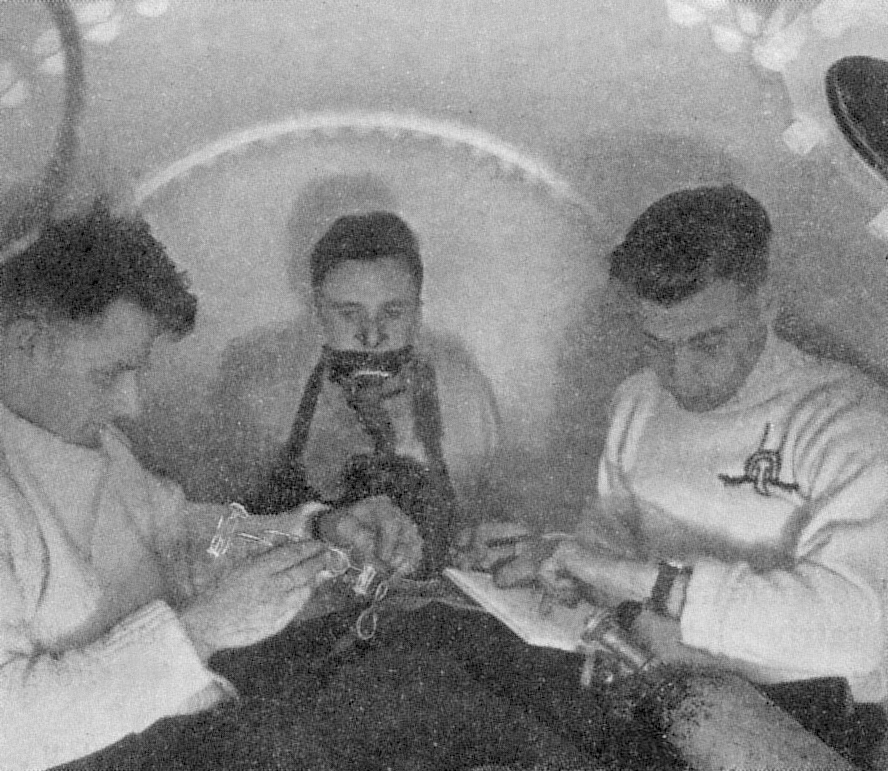
In 1942–43 the UK Government carried out extensive testing for oxygen toxicity in divers. The chamber is pressurised with air to 3.7 bar. The subject in the centre is breathing 100% oxygen from a mask.

The result of breathing increased partial pressures of oxygen is hyperoxia, an excess of oxygen in body tissues. The body is affected in different ways depending on the type of exposure. Central nervous system toxicity is caused by short exposure to high partial pressures of oxygen at greater than atmospheric pressure. Pulmonary toxicity can result from longer exposure to increased oxygen levels during hyperbaric treatment. Symptoms may include disorientation, breathing problems, and vision changes such as myopia. Prolonged exposure to above-normal oxygen partial pressures, or shorter exposures to very high partial pressures, can cause oxidative damage to cell membranes, collapse of the alveoli in the lungs, retinal detachment, and seizures. Oxygen toxicity is managed by reducing the exposure to increased oxygen levels. Studies show that, in the long term, a robust recovery from most types of oxygen toxicity is possible.

Protocols for avoidance of the effects of hyperoxia exist in fields where oxygen is breathed at higher-than-normal partial pressures, including underwater diving using compressed breathing gases. These protocols have resulted in the increasing rarity of seizures due to oxygen toxicity.

Central nervous system oxygen toxicity manifests as symptoms such as visual changes (especially tunnel vision), ringing in the ears (tinnitus), nausea, twitching (especially of the face), behavioural changes (irritability, anxiety, confusion), and dizziness. This may be followed by a tonic–clonic seizure consisting of two phases: intense muscle contraction occurs for several seconds (tonic phase); followed by rapid spasms of alternate muscle relaxation and contraction producing convulsive jerking (clonic phase). The seizure ends with a period of unconsciousness (the postictal state). The onset of seizure depends upon the partial pressure of oxygen in the breathing gas and exposure duration. However, exposure time before onset is unpredictable, as tests have shown a wide variation, both amongst individuals, and in the same individual from day to day. In addition, many external factors, such as underwater immersion, exposure to cold, and exercise will decrease the time to onset of central nervous system symptoms. Decrease of tolerance is closely linked to retention of carbon dioxide.

Pulmonary toxicity symptoms result from an inflammation that starts in the airways leading to the lungs and then spreads into the lungs. This begins as a mild tickle on inhalation and progresses to frequent coughing. If breathing increased partial pressures of oxygen continues, a mild burning on inhalation along with uncontrollable coughing and occasional shortness of breath is experienced. There is generally a reduction in the amount of air that the lungs can hold (vital capacity) and changes in expiratory function and lung elasticity. When the exposure to oxygen above 0.5 bar (50 kPa) is intermittent, it permits the lungs to recover and delays the onset of toxicity.

==== Carbon dioxide toxicity ====
Main symptoms of Carbon dioxide toxicity, by increasing volume percent in air

Normal respiration in divers results in alveolar hypoventilation with inadequate carbon dioxide elimination (hypercapnia). Experimental work by E.H. Lanphier at the US Navy Experimental Diving Unit indicates that:

- Higher inspired oxygen partial pressure at 4 atm (400 kPa) accounted for not more than 25% of the elevation in end tidal carbon dioxide above values found at the same work rate when breathing air just below the surface.
- Increased work of breathing accounted for most of the elevation of alveolar carbon dioxide in exposures above 1 atm (100 kPa), as indicated by the results when helium was substituted for nitrogen at 4 atm (400 kPa).
- Inadequate ventilatory response to exertion was indicated by the fact that, despite resting values in the normal range, end tidal carbon dioxide rose markedly with exertion even when the divers breathed air at a depth of only a few feet.

Carbon dioxide is not expelled completely when the diver exhales into apparatus with mechanical dead space, such as a snorkel, full face diving mask, or diving helmet, and then inhales from the dead space.

In closed circuit or semi-closed circuit rebreather diving, exhaled carbon dioxide must be removed from the breathing system, usually by a scrubber containing a solid chemical compound with a high affinity for CO_{2}, such as soda lime. If not removed from the system, it will cause an increase in the inhaled concentration, known as scrubber breakthrough. When the diver exercises at a higher level of exertion, more carbon dioxide is produced due to elevated metabolic activity. The density of the breathing gas is higher at depth, so the effort required to inhale and exhale (work of breathing) increases, making breathing more difficult and less efficient. The higher gas density also causes gas mixing within the lung to be less efficient, effectively increasing the physiological dead space. The work of breathing can reach a point where all available energy must be expended on breathing. Beyond this point carbon dioxide cannot be eliminated as fast as it is produced.

The diver may intentionally hypoventilate, known as "skip breathing". Skip breathing is a controversial technique to conserve breathing gas when using open-circuit scuba, which consists of briefly pausing or holding the breath between inhalation and exhalation (i.e., "skipping" a breath). This uses more of the available oxygen in the breathing gas, but increases the carbon dioxide level in the alveolar gas and slows its elimination from the circulation. Skip breathing is particularly counterproductive with a rebreather, where the act of breathing pumps the gas around the "loop" to be scrubbed of carbon dioxide, as the exhaled gas is recycled and skip breathing does not reduce oxygen consumption.

Symptoms and signs of early hypercapnia include flushed skin, full pulse, tachypnea, dyspnea, muscle twitches, reduced neural activity, headache, confusion and lethargy, increased cardiac output, an elevation in arterial blood pressure, and a propensity toward arrhythmias. In severe hypercapnia, symptoms progresses to disorientation, panic, hyperventilation, convulsions, unconsciousness, and eventually death.

Hypercapnia is also thought to be a factor increasing risk of central nervous system oxygen toxicity convulsions.

==== Toxicity of contaminants in the breathing gas ====
Toxicity of contaminants is generally a function of concentration and exposure (dose), and therefore the effects increase with the ambient pressure. The consequence is that breathing gases for hyperbaric use must have proportionately lower acceptable limits for toxic contaminants compared to normal surface pressure use. The allowable concentration is also affected by whether the effect is cumulative and whether there is a threshold for acceptable long-term exposure.

Breathing gas contaminants which are a recognised problem in underwater diving include carbon dioxide, carbon monoxide, and volatile hydrocarbons which may be introduced by the compression process, and hydrogen sulfide, which is mainly a problem in the offshore petroleum industry.

=== Hypoxic breathing gas ===
Breathing gas selected to avoid oxygen toxicity at depth, (generally below about 65 m) may be hypoxic at surface pressure or at shallow depths. There may not be any physiological warning during ascent on such a mix before loss of consciousness.

=== Work of breathing ===
Graph of the breathing resistance of an open-circuit demand regulator. The area of the graph (green) is proportional to the net work of breathing for a single breathing cycle.

Hydrostatic pressure differences between the interior of the lung and the breathing gas delivery increased breathing gas density due to ambient pressure, and increased flow resistance due to higher breathing rates may all cause increased work of breathing and fatigue of the respiratory muscles. A high work of breathing may be partially compensated by a higher tolerance for carbon dioxide, and can eventually result in respiratory acidosis. Factors which influence the work of breathing of an underwater breathing apparatus include density and viscosity of the gas, flow rates, cracking pressure (the pressure differential required to open the demand valve), and back pressure over exhaust valves.

==== Positive and negative pressure breathing ====
Small variations in pressure between the delivered gas and the ambient pressure at the lungs can be tolerated. These can result from the trim of the diver in the water, the position of the diaphragm operating the demand valve, the position of the counterlungs in a rebreather, cracking pressure and flow resistance of the exhaust valve, or intentional overpressure in a full-face mask or helmet, intended to reduce the risk of contaminated water leaking into the breathing apparatus through the exhaust valve. A consistent variation in delivered pressure difference does not affect the work of breathing of the apparatus - the whole graph is shifted up or down without change to the enclosed area - but the effort required for inhalation and exhalation are perceptibly different from normal, and if excessive, may make it difficult or impossible to breathe. A negative static lung loading, where the ambient pressure on the chest is greater than the breathing gas supply pressure at the mouth, can increase work of breathing due to reduced compliance of lung soft tissue. Free-flow systems inherently operate under a positive pressure relative to the head, to allow controlled exhaust flow, but not necessarily to the lungs in the upright diver. Snorkel breathing is inherently negative pressure breathing, as the lungs of the swimmer are at least partly below the surface of the water.

There appears to be a connection between negative pressure breathing and a higher risk of pulmonary oedema while diving, as it increases the pressure difference between alveolar blood and gas. The effect is more marked during exercise. The same effect may cause increased sinus congestion in rebreather divers.

=== Use of breathing apparatus ===
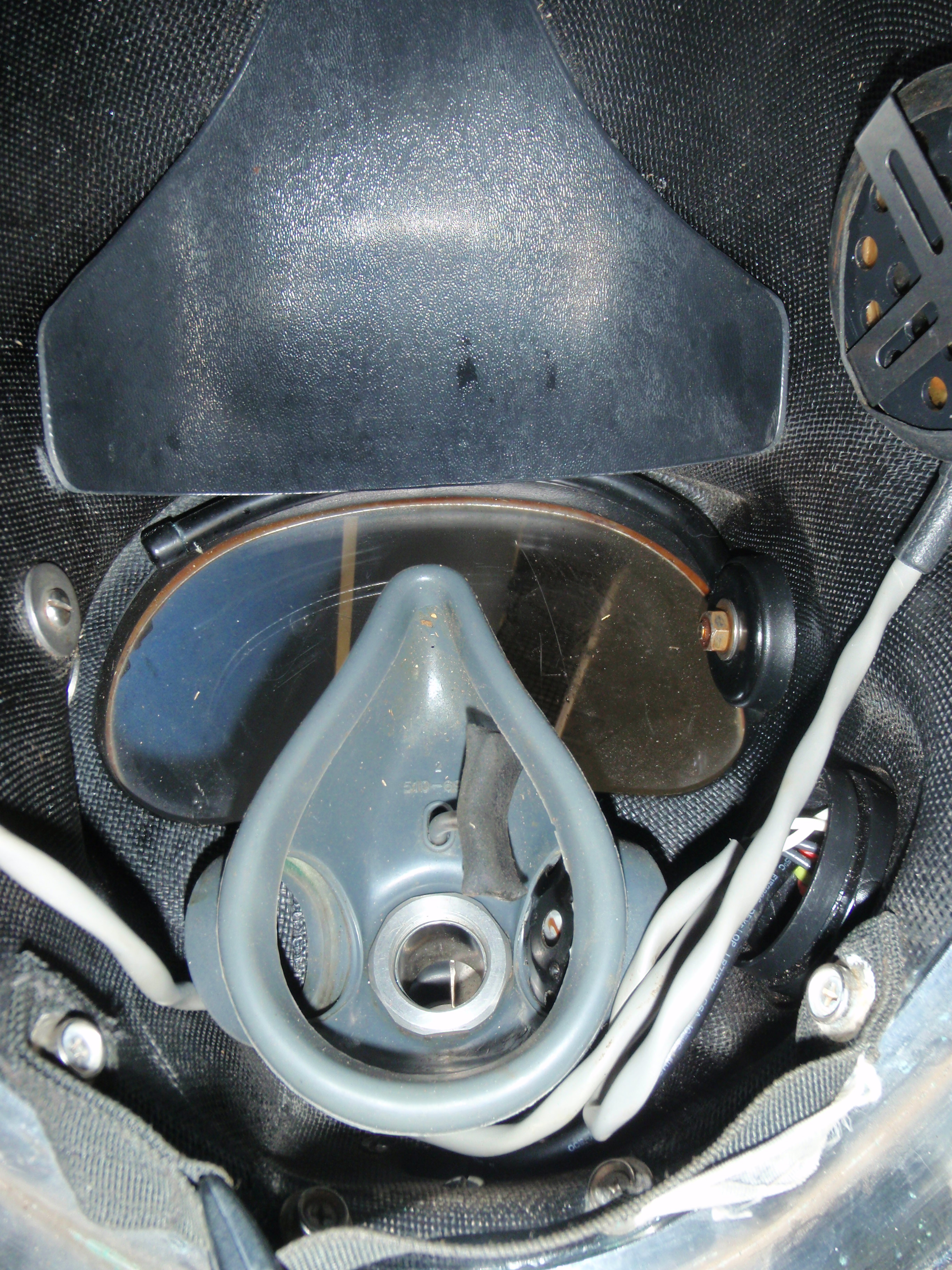
Inside view of a Kirby Morgan 37 showing the oral-nasal mask which reduced the potential dead space inside the helmet

In physiology, dead space is the volume of air which is inhaled that does not take part in the gas exchange, either because it remains in the conducting airways, or reaches alveoli that are not perfused or poorly perfused. In other words, not all the air in each breath is available for the exchange of oxygen and carbon dioxide. Mammals breathe in and out of their lungs, wasting that part of the inspiration which remains in the conducting airways where no gas exchange can occur. In humans, about a third of every resting breath has no change in oxygen and carbon dioxide levels.

Dead space in a breathing apparatus is space in the apparatus in which the breathing gas must flow in both directions as the user breathes in and out, increasing the necessary respiratory effort to get the same amount of usable air or breathing gas, and risking accumulation of carbon dioxide from shallow breaths. It is in effect an external extension of the physiological dead space.

Mechanical dead space can be reduced by design features such as:

- Using separate intake and exhaust passages with one-way valves placed in the mouthpiece. This limits the dead space to between the non return valves and the user's mouth and/or nose. The additional dead space can be minimized by keeping the volume of this external dead space as small as possible, but this should not unduly increase work of breathing.
- With a full face mask or demand diving helmet:
  - Keeping the inside volume small, or
  - Having a small internal orinasal mask inside the main mask, which separates the external respiratory passage from the rest of the mask interior.
  - In a few models of full face mask a mouthpiece like those used on diving regulators is fitted, which has the same function as an oro-nasal mask, but can further reduce the volume of the external dead space, at the cost of forcing mouth-breathing. A smaller volume around the mouth increases distortion of speech. This can make communication more difficult.
  - Free-flow diving helmets avoid the dead space problem by supplying far more air than the diver can use, and eliminating the oro-nasal compartment. This makes the whole interior of the helmet effectively fresh air, as it is adequately flushed during and after each exhalation at the cost of significantly higher gas usage in open circuit systems. This also minimises work of breathing increases due to breathing apperatus resistance to flow, making free-flow helmets particularly suitable for applications where severe exertion may be required.

== Sensory impairment ==
=== Vision ===
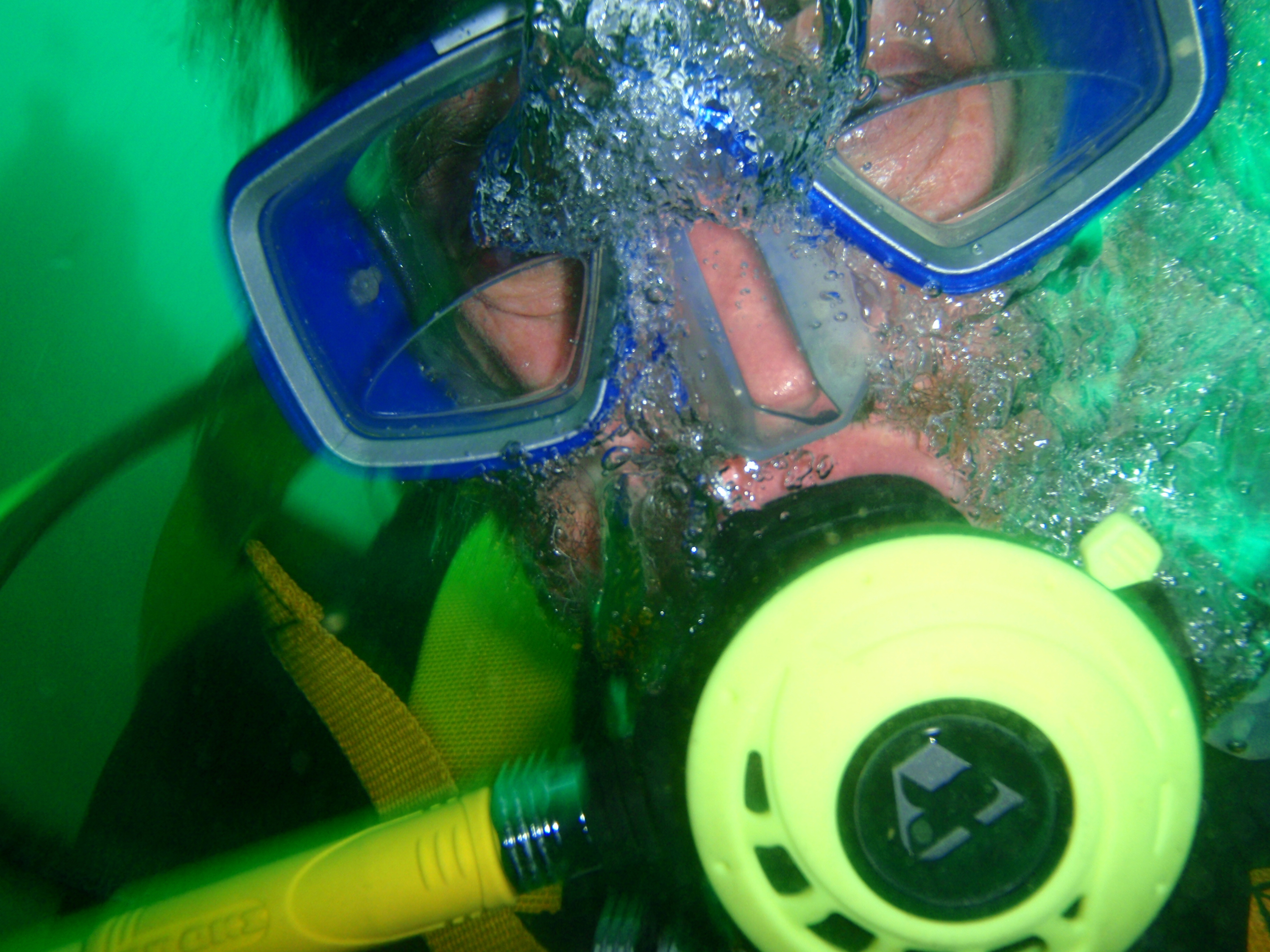
Scuba diver with bifocal lenses fitted to a mask

Underwater, things are less visible because of lower levels of natural illumination caused by rapid attenuation of light with distance passed through the water. They are also blurred by scattering of light between the object and the viewer, also resulting in lower contrast. These effects vary with wavelength of the light, and color and turbidity of the water. The vertebrate eye is usually either optimised for underwater vision or air vision, as is the case in the human eye. The visual acuity of the air-optimised eye is severely adversely affected by the difference in refractive index between air and water when immersed in direct contact. provision of an airspace between the cornea and the water can compensate, but has the side effect of scale and distance distortion. Artificial illumination is effective to improve illumination at short range.

Stereoscopic acuity, the ability to judge relative distances of different objects, is considerably reduced underwater, and this is affected by the field of vision. A narrow field of vision caused by a small viewport in a helmet results in greatly reduced stereoacuity, and associated loss of hand-eye coordination.

At very short range in clear water distance is underestimated, in accordance with magnification due to refraction through the flat lens of the mask, but at greater distances - greater than arm's reach, the distance tends to be overestimated to a degree influenced by turbidity. Both relative and absolute depth perception are reduced underwater. Loss of contrast results in overestimation, and magnification effects account for underestimation at short range.

Divers can to a large extent adapt to these effects by learning to compensate for these distortions.

The optical distortion effects of the diver's mask or helmet faceplate also produce an apparent movement of a stationary object when the head is moved.

=== Hearing ===
Water has different acoustic properties to air. Sound from an underwater source can propagate relatively freely through body tissues where there is contact with the water as the acoustic properties are similar. When the head is exposed to the water, a significant part of sound reaches the cochlea independently of the middle ear and eardrum, but some is transmitted by the middle ear.

Bone conduction plays a major role in underwater hearing when the head is in contact with the water (not inside a helmet), but human hearing underwater, in cases where the diver's ear is wet, is less sensitive than in air.

Sound travels about 4.5 times faster in water than in air, and at a similarly higher speed in body tissues, and therefore the interval between a sound reaching the left and right inner ears is much smaller than in air, and the brain is less able to discriminate the interval which is how direction of a sound source is identified. Some sound localisation is possible, though difficult.

This bypassing of the middle ear also affects the frequency sensitivity of the ear. Sound is also reflected in proportion to the change of density or elasticity (mismatch of acoustic impedance) when passing through an interface, so that enclosing the head in a rigid helmet may cause a significant attenuation of sound originating in the water. Internal sound attenuation material my further reduce noise levels.

Frequency sensitivity underwater also differs significantly to that in air, with a consistently higher threshold of hearing underwater, but also significantly skewed. An underwater noise weighting scale is available to assess noise hazard according to frequency sensitivity for wet conduction.

Hearing loss in divers is a known problem and has many factors, one of which is noise exposure. Open circuit divers produce a high level of breathing noise by airflow through the regulator during inhalation and bubble noise during exhalation. The primary noise source is exhaust bubbles which can exceed 95 dB(A). Voice communications and free-flow demisting push these levels above 100db(A), as communications need to be about 15 dB above background to be intelligible. Free-flow helmet noise levels are generally higher than demand systems, and are comparable with demisting noise levels. Rebreather and reclaim systems are significantly quieter, as there is no bubble noise most of the time. The type of headgear affects noise sensitivity and noise hazard depending on whether transmission is wet or dry. Human hearing underwater is less sensitive with wet ears than in air, and a neoprene hood provides substantial attenuation. When wearing a helmet sensitivity is similar to in surface air, as hearing sensitivity is not significantly affected by the breathing gas or chamber atmosphere composition or pressure.

=== Touch ===
Tactile sensory perception in divers may be impaired by the environmental protection suit and low temperatures. The combination of instability, equipment, neutral buoyancy and resistance to movement by the inertial and viscous effects of the water encumbers the diver. Cold causes losses in sensory and motor function and distracts from and disrupts cognitive activity The ability to exert large and precise force is reduced.

=== Balance ===
Balance and equilibrium depend on vestibular function and secondary input from visual, organic, cutaneous, kinesthetic and sometimes auditory senses which are processed by the central nervous system to provide the sense of balance. Underwater, some of these inputs may be absent or diminished, making the remaining cues more important. Conflicting input may result in vertigo and disorientation. The vestibular sense is considered to be essential in these conditions for rapid, intricate and accurate movement.

=== Proprioception ===
Kinesthetic, proprioceptive and organic perception are a major part of the sensory feedback making the diver aware of personal position and movement, and in association with the vestibular and visual input, allowing the diver to function effectively in maintaining physical equilibrium and balance in the water.

In the water at neutral buoyancy, the cues of position received by the kinesthetic, proprioceptive and organic senses are reduced or absent. This effect may be exacerbated by the diver's suit and other equipment.

=== Smell and taste ===
Senses of taste and smell are not very important to the diver in the water but more important to the saturation diver while in accommodation chambers. There is evidence of a slight decrease in threshold for taste and smell after extended periods under pressure.

== Adaptation in other animals ==
Air-breathing marine vertebrates that have returned to the ocean from terrestrial lineages are a diverse group that include sea snakes, sea turtles, the marine iguana, saltwater crocodiles, penguins, pinnipeds, cetaceans, sea otters, manatees and dugongs. Most diving vertebrates make relatively short shallow dives. Sea snakes, crocodiles and marine iguanas only dive in inshore waters and seldom dive deeper than 10 m, but both of these groups can make much deeper and longer dives. Emperor penguins regularly dive to depths of 400 to 500 m for 4 to 5 minutes, often dive for 8 to 12 minutes and have a maximum endurance of about 22 minutes. Elephant seals stay at sea for between 2 and 8 months and dive continuously, spending 90% of their time underwater and averaging 20 minutes per dive with less than 3 minutes at the surface between dives. Their maximum dive duration is about 2 hours and they routinely feed at depths between 300 and 600 m, though they can exceed depths of 1600 m. Beaked whales have been found to routinely dive to forage at depths between 835 and 1070 m, and remain submerged for about 50 minutes. Their maximum recorded depth is 1888 m, and maximum duration is 85 minutes.

Air-breathing marine vertebrates that dive to feed must deal with the effects of pressure at depth and the need to find and capture their food. Adaptations to diving can be associated with these two requirements. Adaptations to pressure must deal with the mechanical effects of pressure on gas filled cavities, solubility changes of gases under pressure, and possible direct effects of pressure on the metabolism, while adaptations to breath-hold capacity include modifications to metabolism, perfusion, carbon dioxide tolerance, and oxygen storage capacity.

Most marine mammals usually dive within their aerobic dive limits as this minimises the recovery period at or near the surface, and allows a greater total time to be spent underwater, but a few species, including some beaked whales, routinely dive for periods requiring anaerobic metabolism that develops a significant oxygen debt requiring a long recovery period between dives.

Diving vertebrates have increased the amount of oxygen stored in their internal tissues. This oxygen store has three components, oxygen contained in the air in the lungs, oxygen stored by hemoglobin in the blood, and by myoglobin in muscle tissue The muscle and blood of diving vertebrates have greater concentrations of haemoglobin and myoglobin than terrestrial animals. Myoglobin concentration in locomotor muscles of diving vertebrates is up to 30 times more than in terrestrial relatives. Haemoglobin is increased by both a relatively larger amount of blood and a larger proportion of red blood cells in the blood compared with terrestrial animals. The highest values are found in the mammals which dive deepest and longest. Volume of blood is generally relatively large in proportion to body mass, and blood haemoglobin content can be increased during a dive from red blood cells stored in the spleen.

Body size is a factor in diving ability. A larger body mass correlates to a relatively lower metabolic rate, while oxygen storage is directly proportional to body mass, so larger animals should be able to dive for longer, all other things being equal. Swimming efficiency also affects diving ability, as low drag and high propulsive efficiency requires less energy for the same dive. Burst and glide locomotion is also often used to minimise energy consumption, and may involve using positive or negative buoyancy to power part of the ascent or descent.

== Relevance in diver education and training ==
Some basic knowledge of anatomy and physiology are necessary for understanding the effects of diving on the human body, the mechanisms of reasonably foreseeable injuries that may be incurred during diving activities, and the response that may be necessary in the event of such injuries. The physiology of diving is part of entry-level training for professional divers, but may vary for recreational divers, as some certification agencies provide the minimum needed for the specific certification. The scope and level of detail may vary between training providers and certification agencies, and is usually at roughly secondary school level of detail. Some of the commonly required subtopics are listed here.

Aspects of basic physiology necessary for an adequate understanding of the effects of diving on the human body and the mechanism of diving injuries.

- Metabolism – Set of chemical reactions in organisms
  - Organs – Collection of tissues with similar functions
  - Tissues – Group of similar cells performing a specific function
- Circulatory system – Organ system for circulating blood in animals
  - Blood – Body fluid in the circulatory system
  - Heart – Organ found in humans and other animals
    - Atrial septal defect, also known as Patent foramen ovale – Human heart defect present at birth
  - Perfusion – Passage of fluid through the circulatory or lymphatic system to an organ or tissue
  - Pulmonary circulation – Part of the vertebrate circulatory system
    - Pulmonary shunt – Bypass of the pulmonary capillaries by deoxygenated blood
  - Systemic circulation – Portion of the cardiovascular system which circulates blood though most of the body
- Musculo-skeletal system – Organ system that gives humans the capacity to move
- Nervous system – Part of an animal that coordinates actions and senses
  - Central nervous system – Brain and spinal cord
  - Ear – Organ of hearing and balance
- Respiration (physiology) – Exchange of gases between environment and tissues
  - Blood–air barrier – Membrane separating alveolar air from blood in lung capillaries
  - Breathing – Process of moving air in and out of the lungs
  - Control of ventilation – Breathing control
  - Dead space (physiology) – Inhaled air volume not involved in gas exchange
  - Gas exchange – Process by which gases diffuse through a biological membrane
  - Hypercapnia, also known as CO_{2} retention – Abnormally high tissue carbon dioxide levels
  - Hypocapnia – State of reduced carbon dioxide in the blood
  - Hypoxia – Medical condition of lack of oxygen in the tissues
  - Laryngospasm – Involuntary contraction of the vocal folds restricting inhalation
  - Respiratory exchange ratio – Ratio between the metabolic production of carbon dioxide and the uptake of oxygen
  - Respiratory quotient – Ratio of carbon dioxide produced by the body to oxygen consumed by the body
  - Respiratory system – Biological system in animals and plants for gas exchange

Aspects of basic physiology necessary for sufficient understanding of first aid techniques appropriate for commercial and some recreational diver certification. (mostly the same systems, but with more practical detail as may be necessary for first aid)

- First aid – Emergency first response medical treatment
- Cardiopulmonary resuscitation – Emergency procedure after sudden cardiac arrest
- Expired air resuscitation – Artificial ventilation using exhaled air from the rescuer
- Oxygen administration – Provision of oxtgen for therapeutic purposes

== See also ==
- Diving medicine – Diagnosis, treatment and prevention of disorders caused by underwater diving
- List of researchers in diving physiology and medicine
- Physiology of underwater diving – Adaptations of marine vertebrates to diving
- Voluntary tubal opening - voluntary control of LVP and TVP muscles allowing equalisation of the middle ear with ambient pressure.
