= Nasalis =

Nasalis may refer to:

- Nasalis, the genus containing the proboscis monkey (Nasalis larvatus)
- Nasalis muscle, of the nose
