= Frenzel maneuver =

Ear equalization technique originally developed for dive bomber pilots

The Frenzel Maneuver is named after Hermann Frenzel (German ear, nose and throat physician and Luftwaffe commander). The maneuver was developed in 1938 and originally was taught to dive bomber pilots during World War II. The maneuver is used to equalize pressure in the middle ear. Today, the maneuver is also performed by scuba divers, free divers and by passengers on aircraft as they descend.

The trapped air inside the mouth and nasal cavities is compressed by the movement of the tongue or larynx while doing Frenzel maneuver. The air is forced into the nasal cavity by the pressure and tries to exit by the nose, but the nostrils are squeezed shut. Because the glottis is closed, air cannot return to the lungs. The tongue creates an airtight seal against the upper teeth or in the rear of the mouth, preventing air from escaping. Because there is nowhere else for the air to go, it enters the eustachian tubes and the middle ear, equalizing the pressure.

The Frenzel Maneuver is performed as follows:

- the way out of the nasal cavity is blocked, typically by pinching the nostrils or by a nose-clip;
- the way out of the mouth cavity is blocked by the tongue, either performing an alveolar closure (as when the sound [t] or [d] is produced; this is the standard version) or a velar closure (using the back of the tongue; this is the advanced version, leaving very little possibility for the piston movement by the tongue, mentioned below);
- the larynx is closed, sealing off the lungs;
- the body of the tongue (or only the back of the tongue, if velar closure has been made) is gently moved upwards and backwards, in order to compress the air;
- further compression of the air follows from moving the closed glottis upwards (this is easily noticed in the elevation of the "Adam's Apple").

By performing this technique, the compressed air is forced into Eustachian tubes, and thus into the middle ear. In situations where the ambient pressure rises (typical causes are decreasing altitude in the case of an airplane or increasing depth in the case of a diver submerging), the maneuver results in the equalization of the pressure on both sides of the eardrum.

== Differences compared with Valsalva maneuver ==
Compared with the Valsalva maneuver, the Frenzel maneuver carries a significantly lower risk of over-pressurizing the middle or inner ear; given e.g. a nose-clip, it also allows hands-free equalisation. The maneuver can be done at any time during the respiratory cycle and it does not inhibit venous return to the heart. Effort to perform the maneuver is minimal, and it can be repeated many times quickly.

Because it is a more regulated procedure that does not employ the diaphragm, the Frenzel equalisation technique is clearly more appealing to freedivers than the Valsalva technique, especially for freedivers who frequently need to descend at speed. It is far more targeted, effective, and ultimately safer (the increased pressure exerted by the Valsalva technique can actually harm your ears). This procedure is easier to do and does not require as much air as the valsalva maneuver. It is effective in depths of up to -80 meters and can be performed multiple times quickly underwater.

While the Frenzel maneuver is ideal for deeper dives, pulmonary barotrauma — damage and injuries to over-pressured lungs – is becoming more common in the diving world. This is frequently due to unskilled divers trying these new equalization methods to go deeper and faster. While they have mastered equalization procedures, their bodies have not yet adapted to larger depths, which can lead to catastrophic harm.

Different from Valsalva maneuver, Frenzel maneuver can be used in all depth while only depths of up to -30 meters are suitable for Valsalva. There just isn't enough air left in the lungs to equalize the pressure in the ears and sinuses at larger depths. Valsalva maneuver also generates lung muscular contractions, which burns up a lot of oxygen.

== The physiological process ==
The nose, mouth, and throat, as well as how they work together and the strategies that impact them, are all part of the Frenzel maneuver's physiological process. All three are interconnected, and all three effectively go to the lungs. When employing the Frenzel, all three come into action.

First, there's the mouth, which houses the tongue and the epiglottis at the back. The tongue and epiglottis can both trap air in the lungs and push it down the Eustachian tubes. The trachea and oesophagus are the main 'tubes' that lead down from the neck into the body; the trachea leads to the lungs, while the oesophagus leads to the stomach. The epiglottis opens and closes both, although the trachea usually stays open (for breathing purposes) while the epiglottis is usually closed until we swallow (when it opens to allow food and drink into the stomach).

Meanwhile, the soft palate, located in the back of the mouth, has three positions for controlling airflow: raised, neutral, and lowered. When it's raised, air may flow through the mouth to the lungs; when it's dropped, air can only flow through the nose. The soft palate in its neutral posture allows air to flow freely through both the nose and mouth.

Finally, the Eustachian tubes' apertures are located slightly above the soft palate and in the nasal cavity. These small tubes connect the upper pharynx (also known as the nasopharynx) to the middle ear and are essential for equalization.

== Potential problems for unsuccessful Frenzel Maneuver ==
- Due to an open glottis, pressurized air escapes down the throat rather than up the eustachian tubes.
- Because of the elevated soft palate, pressurized air cannot reach the nasal cavity. Recall how the soft palate feels when you're calm.
- Due to the tongue's lack of a good seal all around, pumping the tongue (or larynx) does not create pressure. You're just aimlessly moving the tongue in the air area inside your mouth if you don't have an airtight seal.
- There is no air bubble between the tongue and the roof of the mouth to compress. Keep in mind that after the tongue contacts the roof of the mouth, you won't be able to equalize (since there's nothing to compress) until you transfer a bubble of air between the two. Allow a pocket of air to enter from the lungs to the mouth by breaking the tongue seal.
- Relaxation is a key aspect of equalization that is frequently overlooked. Equalization becomes difficult, if not impossible, when we are agitated. When we aren't feeling well during a dive, we tend to stiffen up. Equalization suffers tremendously when you're not ready or prepared for the dive, can't relax throughout the descent, have early contractions, or are fatigued, anxious, or stressed. The soft palate is raised when we are stressed. The blockage prevents air from being pumped into the eustachian tubes. On a dive, it takes a certain amount of awareness to notice this, but it's crucial to remember that stress causes a lot of equalization problems. On a dive, eliminate the potential sources of stress and anxiety.

== History ==
The Frenzel Maneuver was developed by Herman Frenzel, a Luftwaffe officer who trained dive-bomber pilots this maneuver during WWII. The goal is to lock off your vocal chords as if you were going to lift a heavyweight. The nostrils are pinched closed and an attempt is made to produce a 'k' or 'guh' sound. This will elevate the 'Adam's Apple' by raising the back of the tongue. This converts the tongue into a piston, which forces air upward.

== See also ==
- Barotrauma
- Ear clearing
- Valsalva manoeuvre
