= Middle ear equalization =

Equalising of pressure in the middle ears

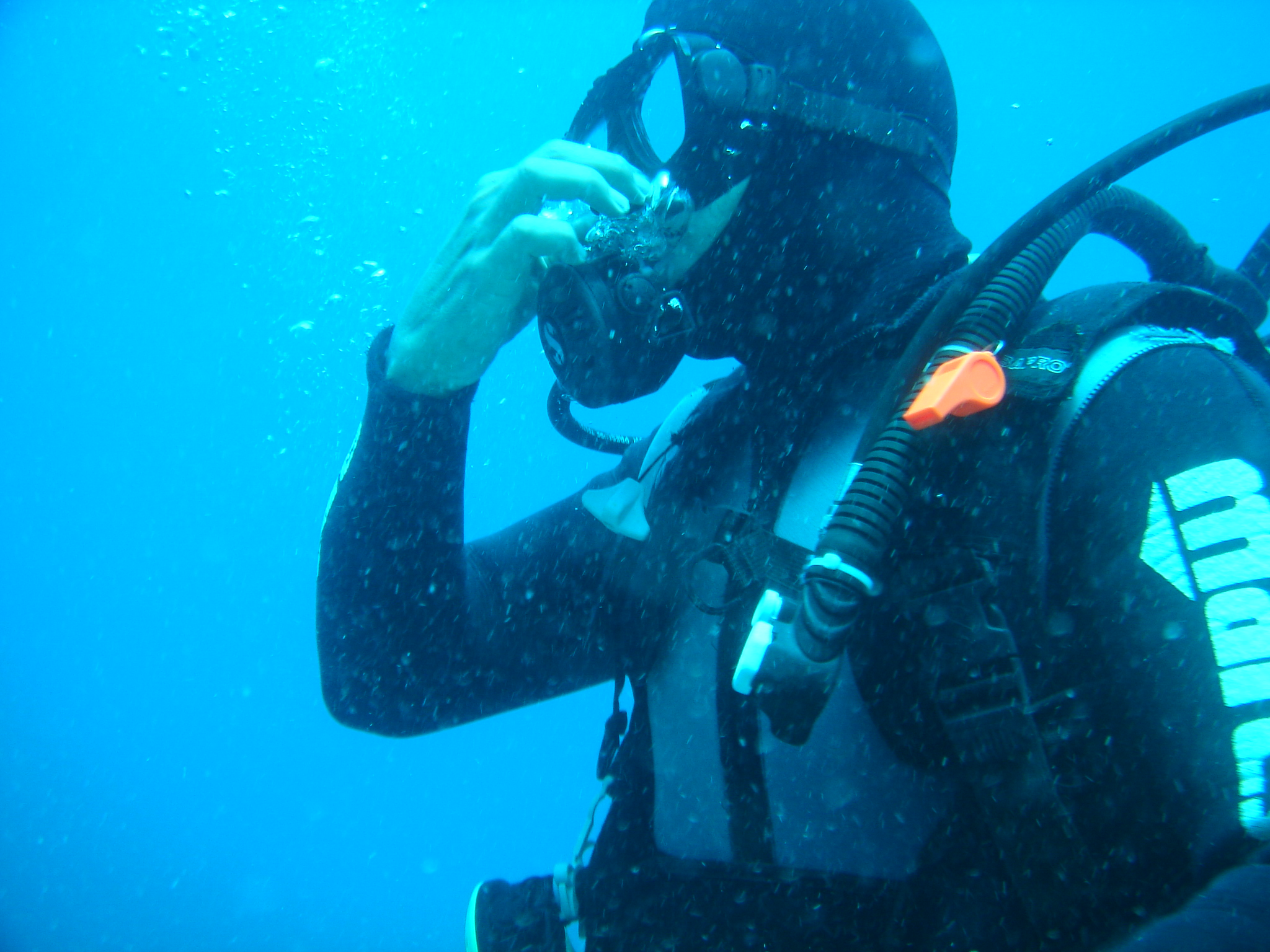
Diver clearing ears

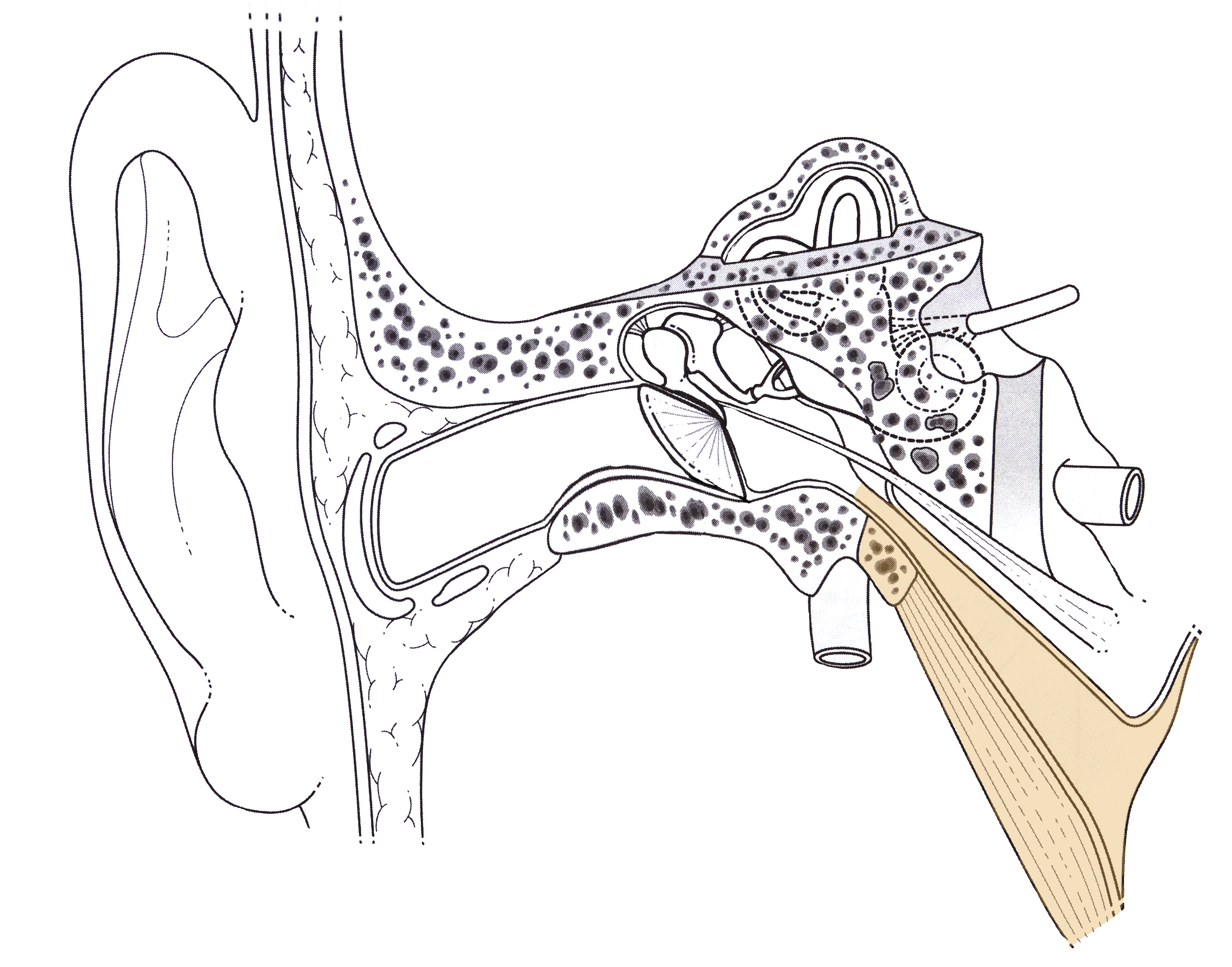
Section of the human ear, the Eustachian tube is shown in colour

Ear clearing, clearing the ears or equalization is any of various maneuvers to equalize the pressure in the middle ear with the outside pressure, by letting air enter along the Eustachian tubes, as this does not always happen automatically when the pressure in the middle ear is lower than the outside pressure. This need can arise in scuba diving, freediving/spearfishing, skydiving, fast descent in an aircraft, fast descent in a mine cage, and being put into pressure in a caisson or similar internally pressurised enclosure, or sometimes even simply travelling at fast speeds in an automobile.

Normally the ears will clear automatically during a reduction in ambient pressure, but if they do not, a reverse squeeze may occur, which can also require clearing to avoid causing injury to the eardrum or inner ear.

== Methods ==
The ears can be cleared by various methods, some of which pose a distinct risk of barotrauma including perforation of the eardrum:

- Yawning which helps to open the eustachian tubes;
- Swallowing which helps to open the eustachian tubes;
- The "Frenzel maneuver": Using the rear part of the tongue and throat muscles, close the nostrils, and close the back of the throat as if straining to lift a weight. Then make the sound of the letter "K." This pushes the back of the tongue upward, compressing air into the openings of the eustachian tubes.
- "Politzerization": a medical procedure that involves inflating the middle ear by blowing air up the nose during the act of swallowing;
- The "Toynbee maneuver": pinching the nose and swallowing. Swallowing pulls open the eustachian tubes while the movement of the tongue, with the nose closed, compresses air which passes through the tubes to the middle ear.
- The "Valsalva maneuver": pinching the nose and closing the mouth and trying to breathe out through the nose. If the hand cannot reach the nose, it is possible to learn to pinch the nose shut by the action of two small face muscles called compressor naris. This is the first technique normally taught, but needs to be performed gently to lessen side-effects.
- The "Lowry technique", a combination of Valsalva and Toynbee: pinching the nose to close the nostrils, and blow and swallow at the same time.
  The nose can be closed without using a hand, using the compressor naris muscles; it can be described as "wrinkling the nose as if there was a bad smell". A hand cannot access the nose if using a full facemask. Therefore, many eyes-and-nose diving masks have two small pockets in their underside, or, like goggles, have the soft edge extended downwards over the nose, to let two fingers reach the nose and pinch it.
- The "Edmonds technique": while tensing the soft palate (the soft tissue at the back of the roof of the mouth) and throat muscles and pushing the jaw forward and down, do a Valsalva maneuver.
- The "BTV method" (béance tubaire volontaire, voluntary opening of the tubes): Tense the muscles of the soft palate and the throat while pushing the jaw forward and down as if starting to yawn. This may require some training.

No single method is considered safest or most successful in equalization of the middle ear pressure. Using alternative techniques may improve the success individually when a technique fails.

== Precautions ==
The pressure difference between the middle ear and the outside, if not released, can result in a burst eardrum. This damages hearing, and if this occurs underwater, cold water in the middle ear chills the inner ear, causing vertigo. The pressure difference can also cause damage to other body air spaces, such as the paranasal sinuses. This can also be caused by damaged sinus ducts.

To allow successful equalization when diving, it is important that the diving suit hood not make an airtight seal over the outside ear hole, and that earplugs not be worn. Diving is proscribed when a eustachian tube is congested or blocked, such as can occur with the common cold, as this may cause what is known as a reverse block, whereby descent is uninhibited as the Valsalva maneuver may still clear the eustachian tubes temporarily by force, but during ascent a blockage may stop the air in the middle ear (which is now at depth pressure) from escaping as the diver ascends. The eardrum then bursts outwards, causing the same hazards as with an ordinary burst eardrum, such as cold water in the middle ear deranging the working of the sense organs of balance in the inner ear.

=== Decongestants ===
Nasal congestion may affect the sinus openings and the eustachian tubes and may lead to difficulty or inability to clear the ears. To prevent congestion, allergies can be treated by the use of antihistamines, decongestants and nasal sprays, and allergy desensitization. Recently developed antihistamines do not cross the blood–brain barrier and do not produce drowsiness.

Decongestants can have side effects such as speeding up heart rate which may have adverse effects in cases where there is underlying cardiovascular disease. Over-the-counter nasal sprays can produce a rebound effect causing greater congestion when the effect wears off, which can lead to reversed ear blockage on ascent. Some steroid nasal sprays do not have this side effect and can be very effective, but may also only be available by prescription.

Combinations of the same drugs are useful in non-allergic rhinitis. These medications can be very useful in controlling the nasal congestion problem.

== Training ==
Divers get training in clearing the ears to dive. Because of the potential for side effects of the valsalva maneuver, scuba divers and free-divers may train to exercise the muscles that open the Eustachian tubes in a gentler manner. The French underwater association (Fédération Française d'Études et de Sports Sous-Marins) has produced a series of exercises using the tongue and soft palate to assist a diver in clearing their ears by these techniques. These recommendations were based on work done at the Médecine du sport, Bd st Marcel, Paris.

With practice it is possible for some people to close the nostrils hands-free by contracting the compressor naris muscles. Some people are able to voluntarily hold their Eustachian tubes open continuously for a period of several seconds to minutes. The 'clicking your ears' can actually be heard if one puts one's ear to another person's ear for them to hear the clicking sound. Those that are borderline on learning this voluntary control first discover this via yawning or swallowing or other means, which after practice can be done deliberately without force even when there are no pressure issues involved. When the Eustachian tubes are deliberately held open, one's voice sounds louder in one's head than when they are closed.

== See also ==
- Barotrauma – Injury due to pressure difference between gas filled space and adjoining tissue
