= Salpingopharyngeus muscle =

Muscle of the pharynx

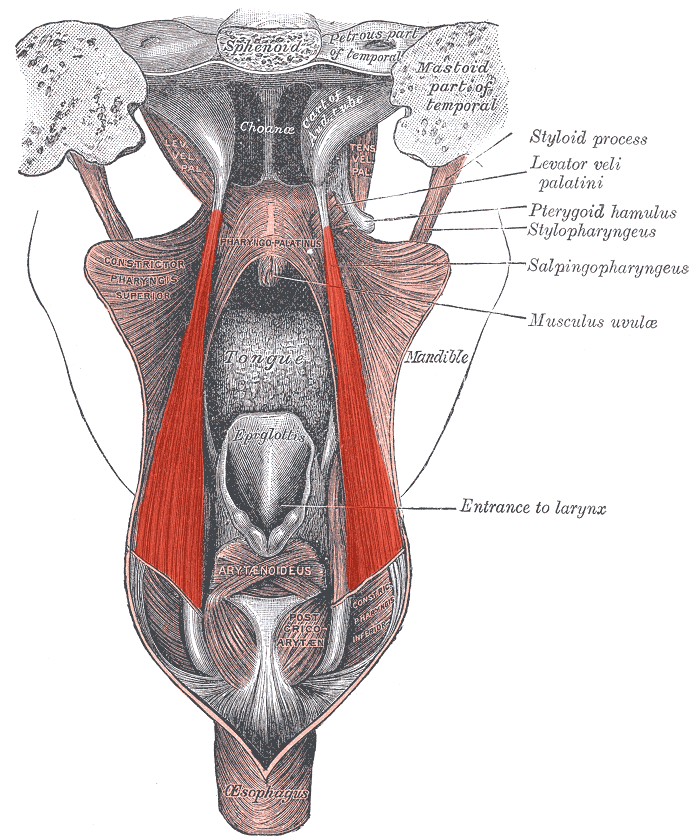
- Dissection of the muscles of the palate from behind.

Details
- Origin: Lower part of the cartilage of the auditory tube
- Insertion: Fibers pass downward and blend with the palatopharyngeus muscle to the upper border thyroid cartilage, blending with constrictor fibers
- Artery: Ascending pharyngeal artery
- Nerve: Vagus nerve (CN X)
- Actions: Assists in elevating pharynx, pulls on torus tubarius to pressure equalize middle ear

Identifiers
- Latin: musculus salpingopharyngeus
- TA98: A05.3.01.115
- TA2: 2191
- FMA: 46665

The salpingopharyngeus muscle is a muscle of the pharynx. It arises from the lower part of the cartilage of the Eustachian tube, and inserts into the palatopharyngeus muscle by blending with its posterior fasciculus. It is innervated by vagus nerve (cranial nerve X) via the pharyngeal plexus. It raises the pharynx and larynx during deglutition (swallowing) and laterally draws the pharyngeal walls up. It opens the pharyngeal orifice of the Eustachian tube during swallowing to allow for the equalization of pressure between it and the pharynx.

== Structure ==
The salpingopharyngeus is a very slender muscle. It passes inferior-ward from its origin to its insertion within the salpingopharyngeal fold.

=== Origin ===
The salpingopharyngeus muscle arises from the inferior portion of the cartilaginous part of the pharyngotympanic tube near its pharyngeal opening. Its origin creates the posterior welt of the torus tubarius.

=== Insertion ===
It ends distally by blending with the palatopharyngeus muscle.

=== Innervation ===
The salpingopharyngeus receives motor innervation from the pharyngeal plexus of the vagus nerve.

=== Blood supply ===
The salpingopharyngeus muscle receives arterial supply from the ascending palatine artery, greater palatine artery, and the pharyngeal branch of the ascending pharyngeal artery.

=== Variation ===
The salpingopharyngeus muscle is absent in about 40% of individuals. It is more common in thin individuals.

== Function ==
The salpingopharyngeus muscle raises the pharynx and larynx during deglutition (swallowing) and laterally draws the pharyngeal walls up. Unusually, it is relaxed during deglutition, but contracts at all other times. It opens the pharyngeal orifice of the Eustachian tube during swallowing allowing for the equalization of pressure between it and the pharynx.

== See also ==
- Salpinx

== Additional images ==
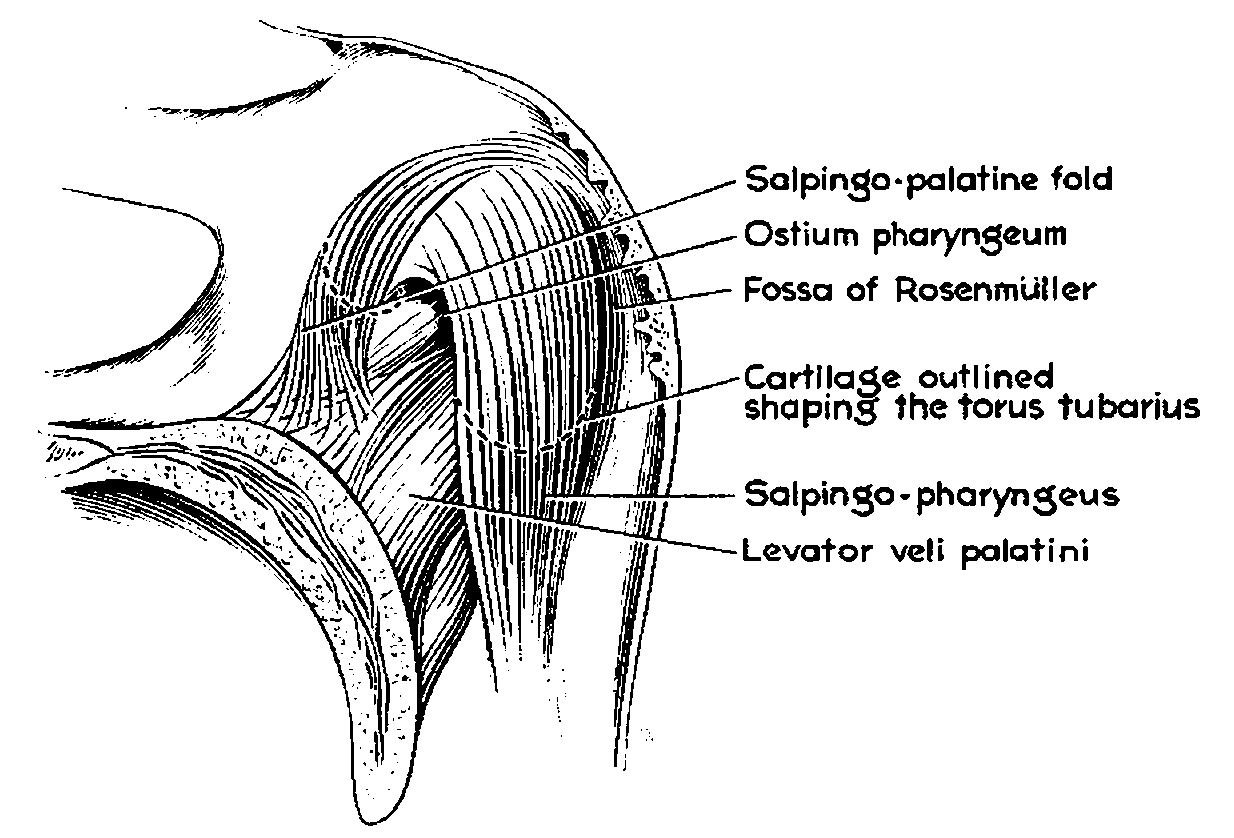
Torus tubarius dissection show salpingopharyngeus muscle

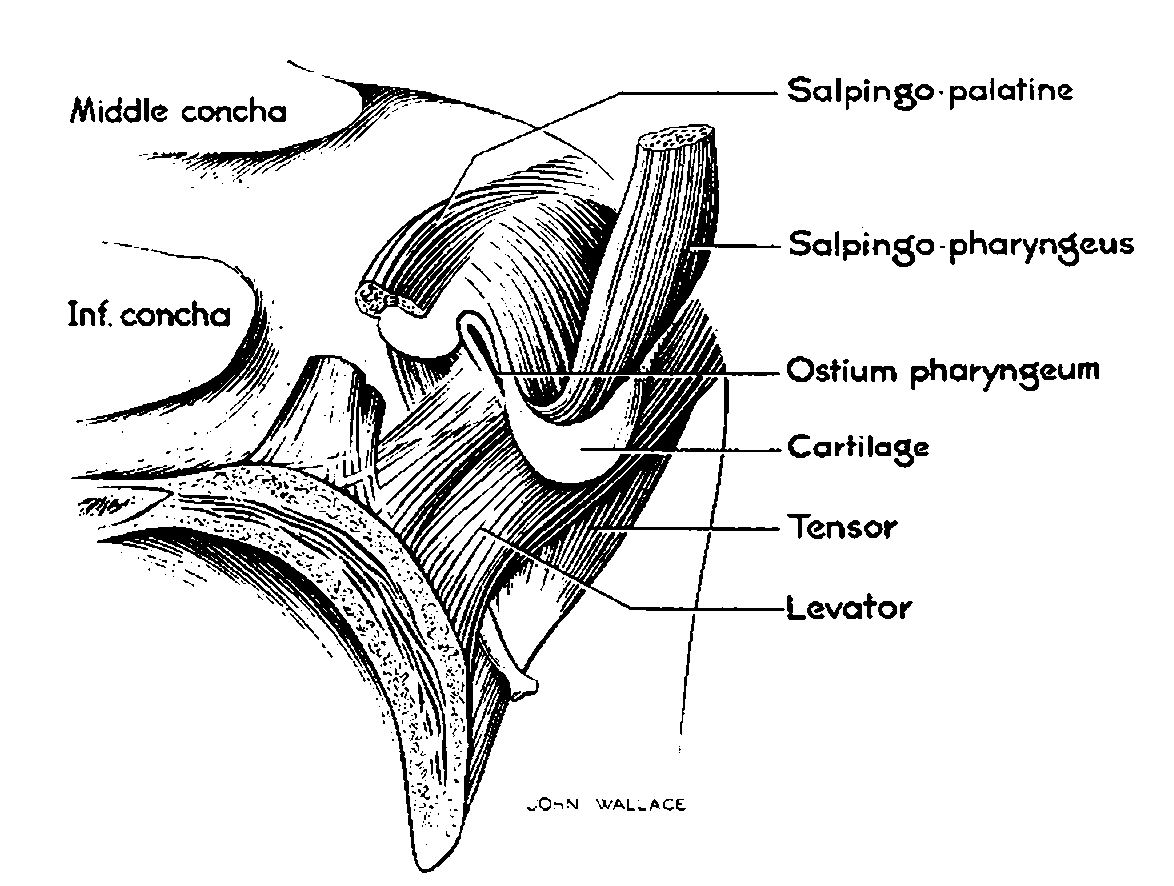
salpingopharyngeus muscle dissection
