= Classification of pneumonia =

Pneumonia
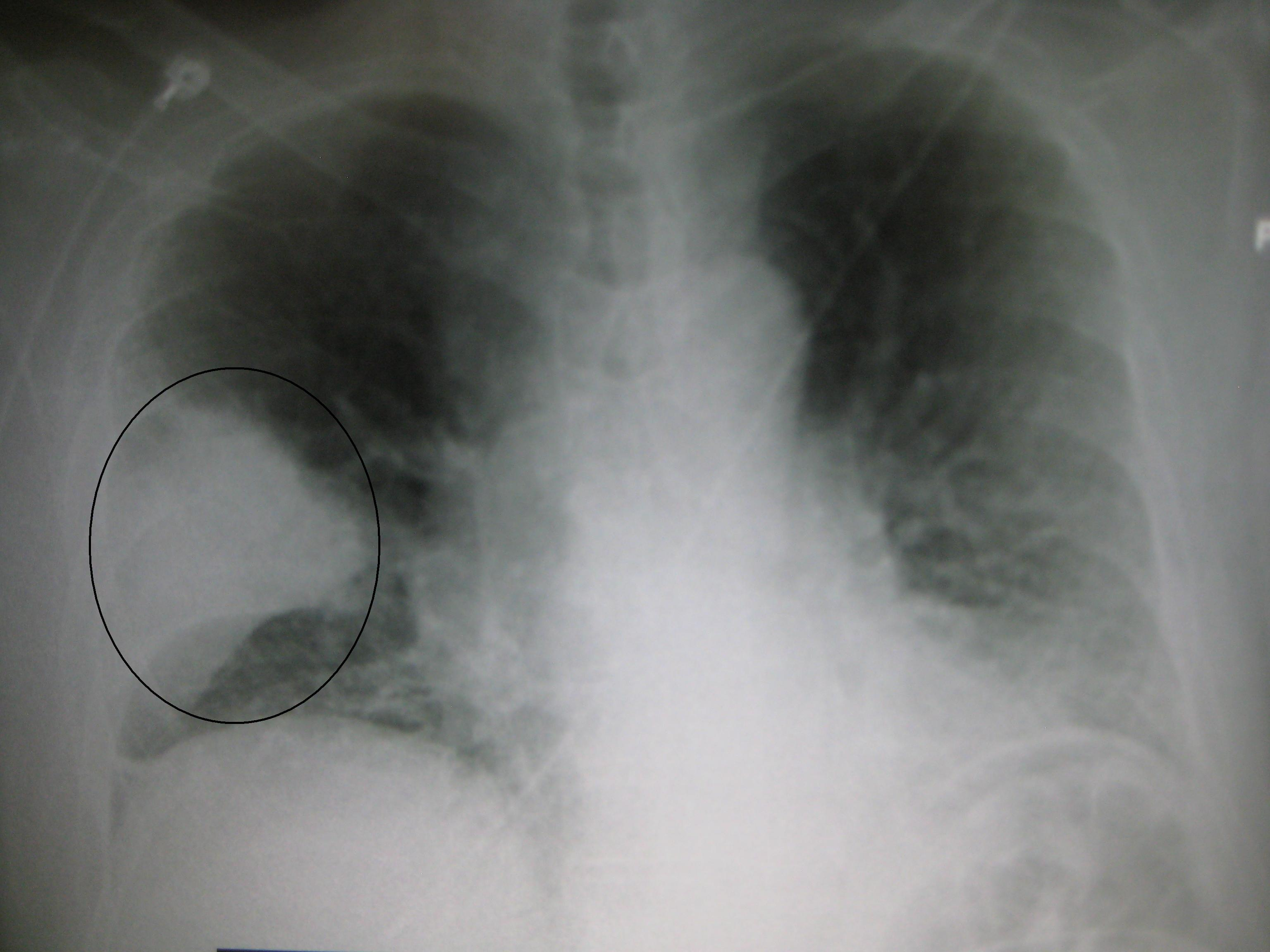
- A chest X-ray showing a very prominent wedge-shape bacterial pneumonia in the right lung
- Specialty: Pulmonology

Pneumonia can be classified in several ways, most commonly by where it was acquired (hospital versus community), but may also by the area of lung affected or by the causative organism. There is also a combined clinical classification, which combines factors such as age, risk factors for certain microorganisms, the presence of underlying lung disease or systemic disease and whether the person has recently been hospitalized.

== By location acquired ==
=== Community-acquired ===
Community-acquired pneumonia (CAP) is infectious pneumonia in a person who has not recently been hospitalized. CAP is the most common type of pneumonia. The most common causes of CAP vary depending on a person's age, but they include Streptococcus pneumoniae, viruses, the atypical bacteria, and Haemophilus influenzae. Overall, Streptococcus pneumoniae is the most common cause of community-acquired pneumonia worldwide. Gram-negative bacteria cause CAP in certain at-risk populations. CAP is the fourth most common cause of death in the United Kingdom and the sixth in the United States. The term "walking pneumonia" has been used to describe a type of community-acquired pneumonia of less severity (because the affected person can continue to "walk" rather than requiring hospitalization). Walking pneumonia is usually caused by the atypical bacterium, Mycoplasma pneumoniae.

=== Hospital-acquired ===
Hospital-acquired pneumonia, also called nosocomial pneumonia, is pneumonia acquired during or after hospitalization for another illness or procedure with onset at least 72 hrs after admission. The causes, microbiology, treatment and prognosis are different from those of community-acquired pneumonia. Up to 5% of patients admitted to a hospital for other causes subsequently develop pneumonia. Hospitalized patients may have many risk factors for pneumonia, including mechanical ventilation, prolonged malnutrition, underlying heart and lung diseases, decreased amounts of stomach acid, and immune disturbances. Additionally, the microorganisms a person is exposed to in a hospital are often different from those at home. Hospital-acquired microorganisms may include resistant bacteria such as MRSA, Pseudomonas, Enterobacter, and Serratia. Because individuals with hospital-acquired pneumonia usually have underlying illnesses and are exposed to more dangerous bacteria, it tends to be more deadly than community-acquired pneumonia. Ventilator-associated pneumonia (VAP) is a subset of hospital-acquired pneumonia. VAP is pneumonia which occurs after at least 48 hours of intubation and mechanical ventilation.

== By cause ==
Pneumonia has historically been characterized as either typical or atypical depending on the presenting symptoms and thus the presumed underlying organism. Attempting to make this distinction based on symptoms, however, has not been found to be accurate, and The American Thoracic Society does not recommend its use.

=== Bronchiolitis obliterans organizing pneumonia ===
Bronchiolitis obliterans organizing pneumonia (BOOP) is caused by inflammation of the small airways of the lungs. It is also known as cryptogenic organizing pneumonitis (COP).

=== Eosinophilic pneumonia ===
Eosinophilic pneumonia is invasion of the lung by eosinophils, a particular kind of white blood cell. Eosinophilic pneumonia often occurs in response to infection with a parasite or after exposure to certain types of environmental factors.

=== Chemical pneumonia ===
Chemical pneumonia (usually called chemical pneumonitis) is caused by chemical toxicants such as pesticides, which may enter the body by inhalation or by skin contact. When the toxic substance is an oil, the pneumonia may be called lipoid pneumonia.

=== Aspiration pneumonia ===
Aspiration pneumonia (or aspiration pneumonitis) is caused by aspirating foreign objects which are usually oral or gastric contents, either while eating, or after reflux or vomiting which results in bronchopneumonia. The resulting lung inflammation is not an infection but can contribute to one, since the material aspirated may contain anaerobic bacteria or other unusual causes of pneumonia. Aspiration is a leading cause of death among hospital and nursing home patients, since they often cannot adequately protect their airways and may have otherwise impaired defenses.

=== Dust pneumonia ===
Dust pneumonia describes disorders caused by excessive exposure to dust storms, particularly during the Dust Bowl in the United States. With dust pneumonia, dust settles all the way into the alveoli of the lungs, stopping the cilia from moving and preventing the lungs from ever clearing themselves.

=== Necrotizing pneumonia ===
Necrotizing pneumonia (NP), also known as cavitary pneumonia or cavitatory necrosis, is a rare but severe complication of lung parenchymal infection. In necrotizing pneumonia, there is a substantial liquefaction following death of the lung tissue, which may lead to gangrene formation in the lung. In most cases patients with NP have fever, cough and bad breath, and those with more indolent infections have weight loss. Often patients clinically present with acute respiratory failure. The most common pathogens responsible for NP are Streptococcus pneumoniae, Staphylococcus aureus, Klebsiella pneumoniae.

=== Opportunistic pneumonia ===
People with weakened immune defense, such as HIV/AIDS patients, are highly susceptible to opportunistic infections affecting the lungs. Most common pathogens are Pneumocystis jiroveci, Mycobacterium avium-intracellulare complex, Streptococcus pneumoniae, Haemophilus species. Less frequent pathogens are Cryptococcus neoformans, Histoplasma capsulatum, Coccidioides immitis, cytomegalovirus (CMV), and Toxoplasma gondii.

Chemotherapy-induced immunodeficiency may lead to severe lung infections. Pathogens commonly associated with lung infectioins are bacteria (like Pseudomonas aeruginosa, Stenotrophomonas maltophilia, and Nocardia species), viruses (e.g., respiratory syncytial virus, parainfluenza virus, influenza virus A and influenza B, and cytomegalovirus), and fungi (e.g. Aspergillus, Fusarium, and Mucorales species, and Pneumocystis jirovecii).

=== Double pneumonia (bilateral pneumonia) ===
Double pneumonia is a historical term for acute lung injury (ALI) or acute respiratory distress syndrome (ARDS). However, the term was, and still is used to denote pneumonia affecting both lungs. Accordingly, the term double pneumonia is more likely to be used to describe bilateral pneumonia than it is ALI or ARDS.

=== Severe acute respiratory syndrome ===
Severe acute respiratory syndrome (SARS) is a highly contagious and deadly type of pneumonia which first occurred in November 2002 after initial outbreaks in China caused by SARS-CoV, which had almost disappeared by the month of May 2004 (it was later called SARS-CoV-1 to distinguish it from other similar viruses). The second outbreak, SARS-CoV-2, started in December 2019 from Wuhan, China and was declared a pandemic by the WHO on 11 March 2020. SARS is caused by the SARS coronavirus, a previously unknown pathogen.

== By area of lung affected ==
Initial descriptions of pneumonia focused on the anatomic or pathologic appearance of the lung, either by direct inspection at autopsy or by its appearance under a microscope.

- A lobar pneumonia is an infection that only involves a single lobe, or section, of a lung. Lobar pneumonia is often due to Streptococcus pneumoniae (though Klebsiella pneumoniae is also possible.)
- Multilobar pneumonia involves more than one lobe, and it often causes a more severe illness.
- Bronchial pneumonia affects the lungs in patches around the tubes (bronchi or bronchioles).
- Interstitial pneumonia involves the areas in between the alveoli, and it may be called "interstitial pneumonitis." It is more likely to be caused by viruses or by atypical bacteria.

The discovery of x-rays made it possible to determine the anatomic type of pneumonia without direct examination of the lungs at autopsy and led to the development of a radiological classification. Early investigators distinguished between typical lobar pneumonia and atypical (e.g. Chlamydophila) or viral pneumonia using the location, distribution, and appearance of the opacities they saw on chest x-rays. Certain x-ray findings can be used to help predict the course of illness, although it is not possible to clearly determine the microbiologic cause of a pneumonia with x-rays alone.

With the advent of modern microbiology, classification based upon the causative microorganism became possible. Determining which microorganism is causing an individual's pneumonia is an important step in deciding treatment type and length. Sputum cultures, blood cultures, tests on respiratory secretions, and specific blood tests are used to determine the microbiologic classification. Because such laboratory testing typically takes several days, microbiologic classification is usually not possible at the time of initial diagnosis.

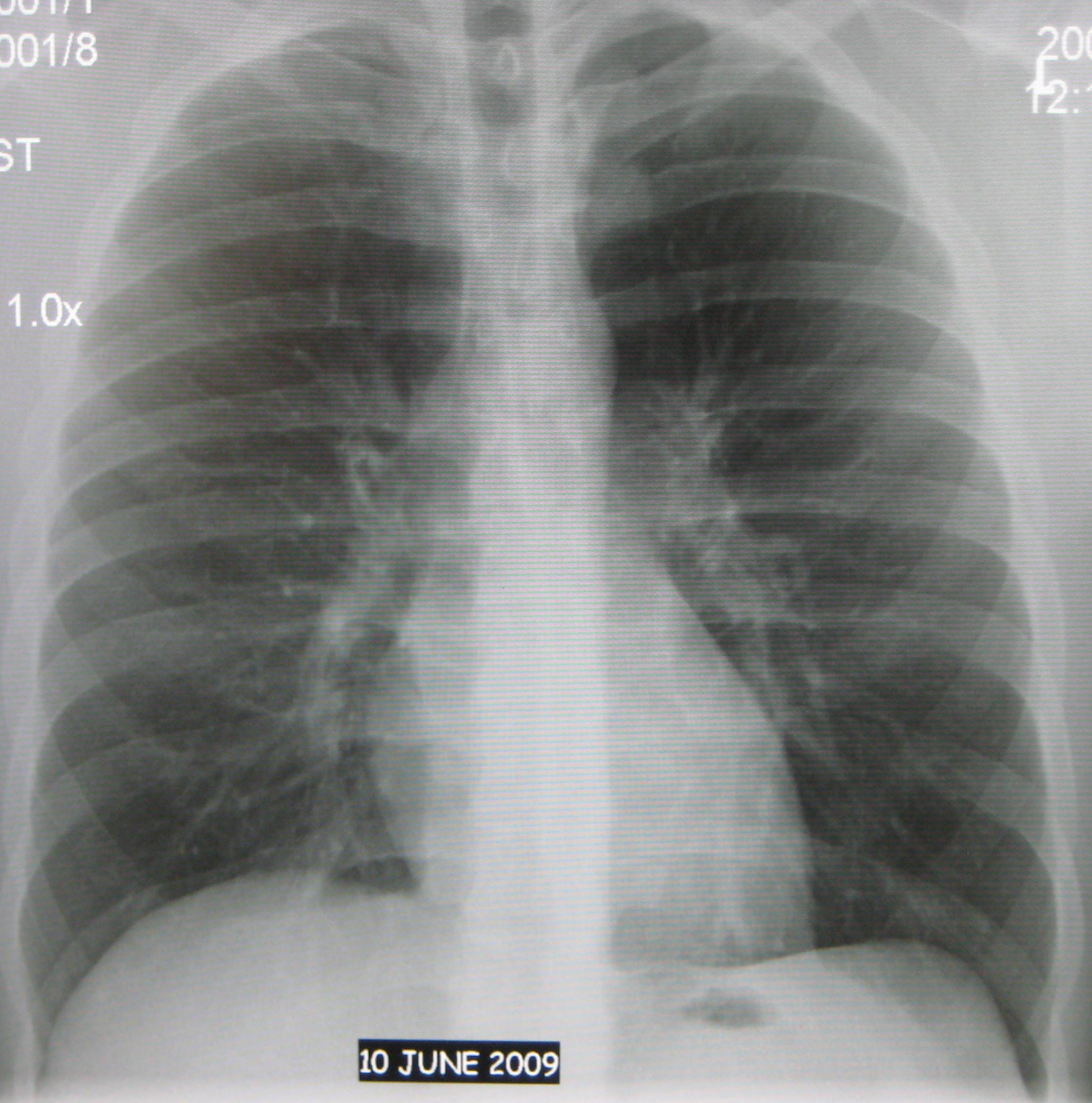
Normal AP CXR

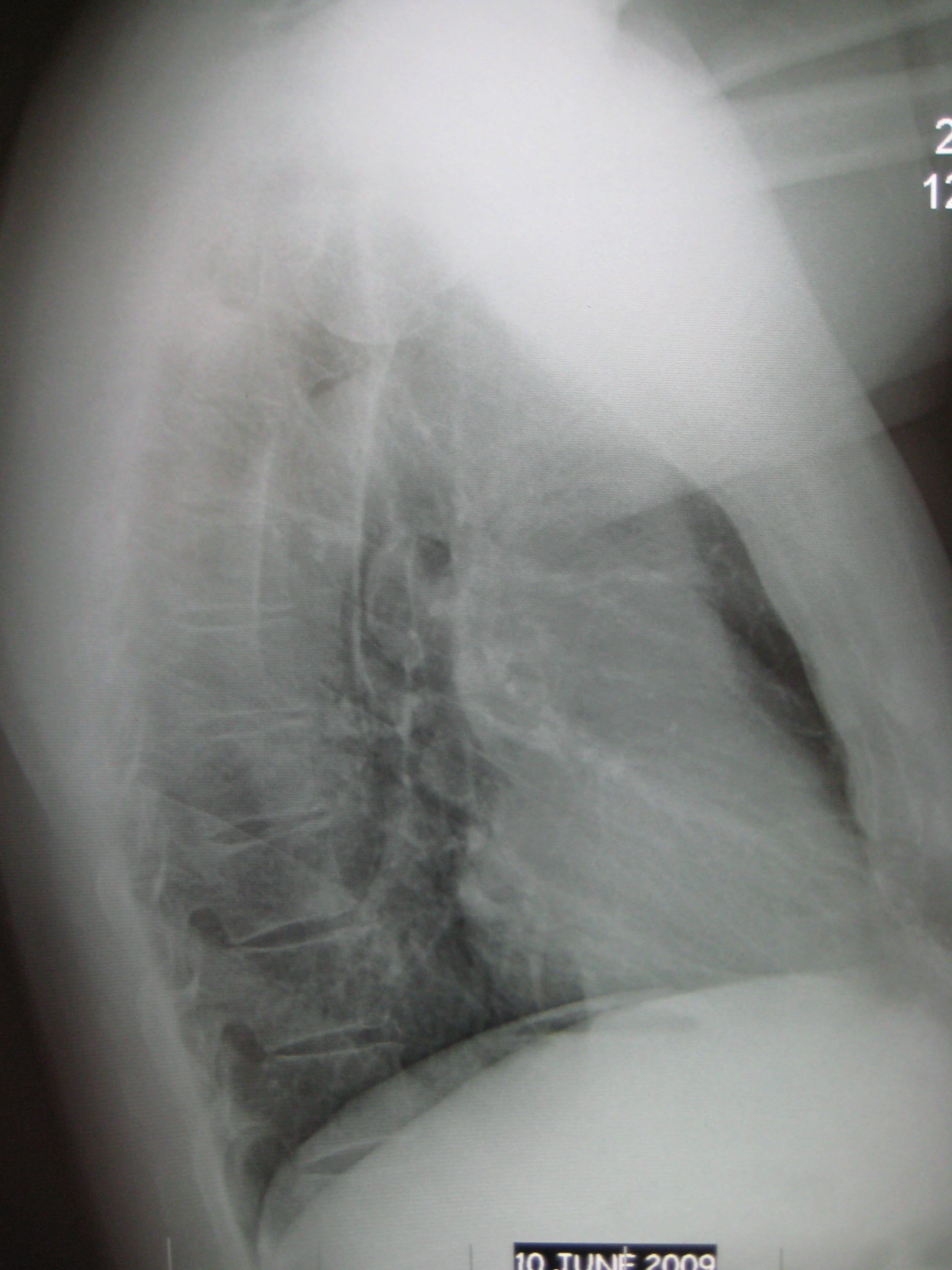
Normal lateral CXR

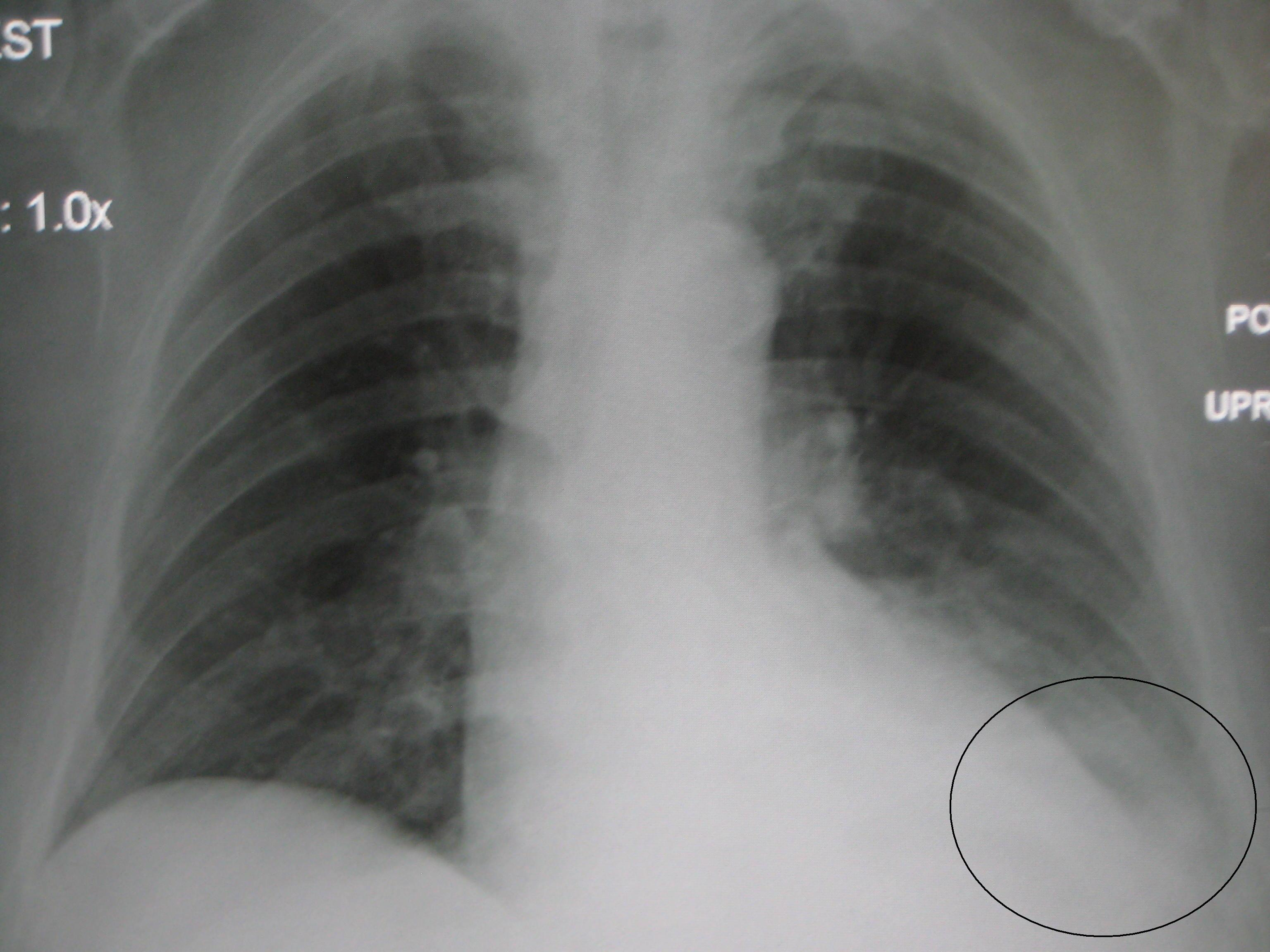
AP CXR showing left lower lobe pneumonia associated with a small left sided pleural effusion

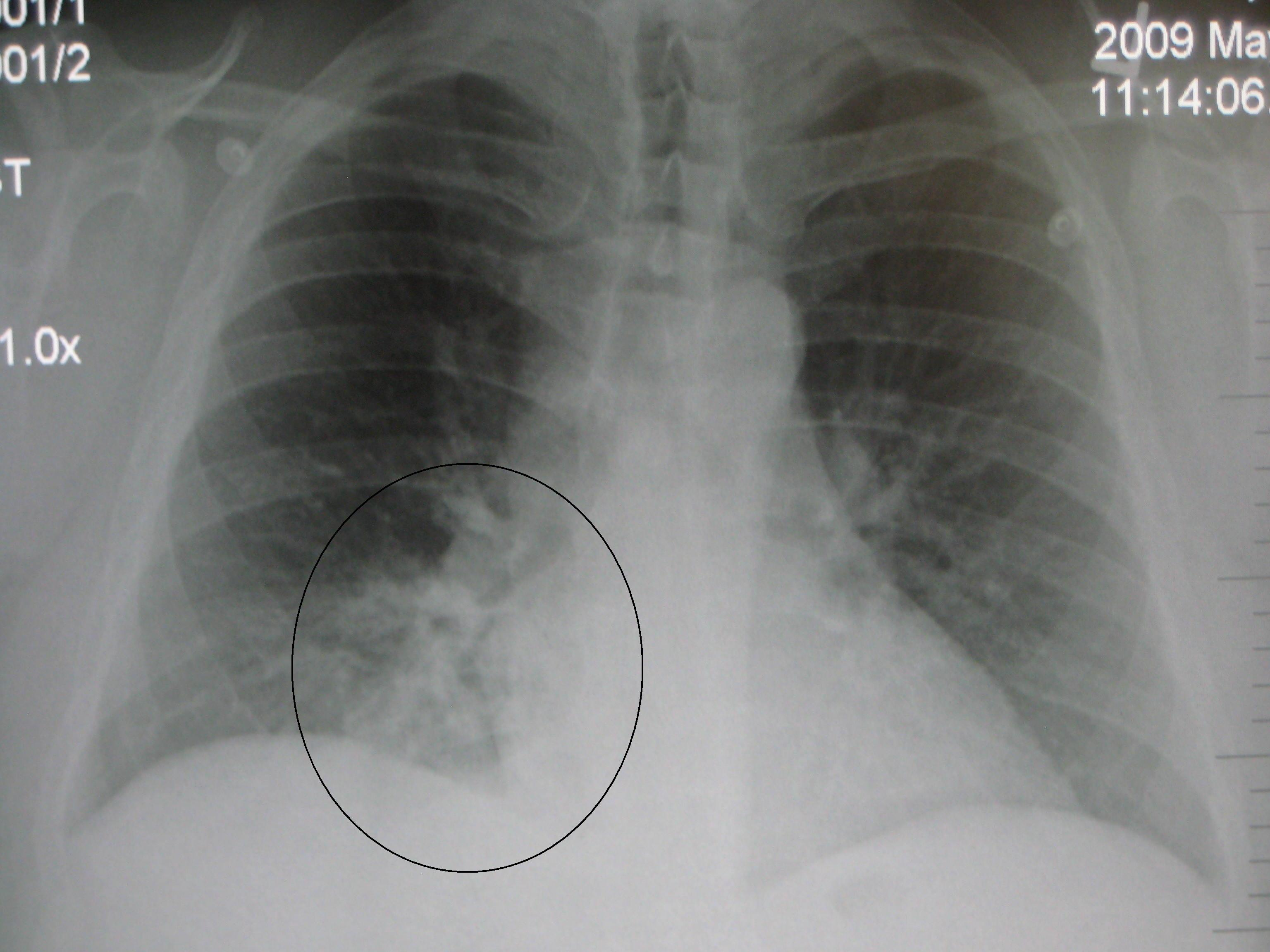
AP CXR showing right lower lobe pneumonia

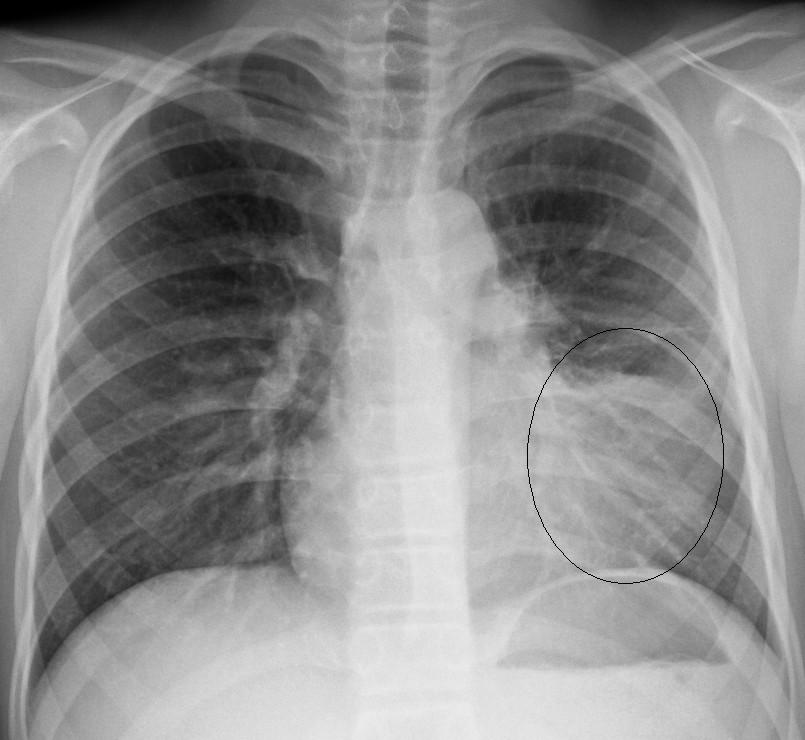
AP CXR showing pneumonia of the lingula of the left lung

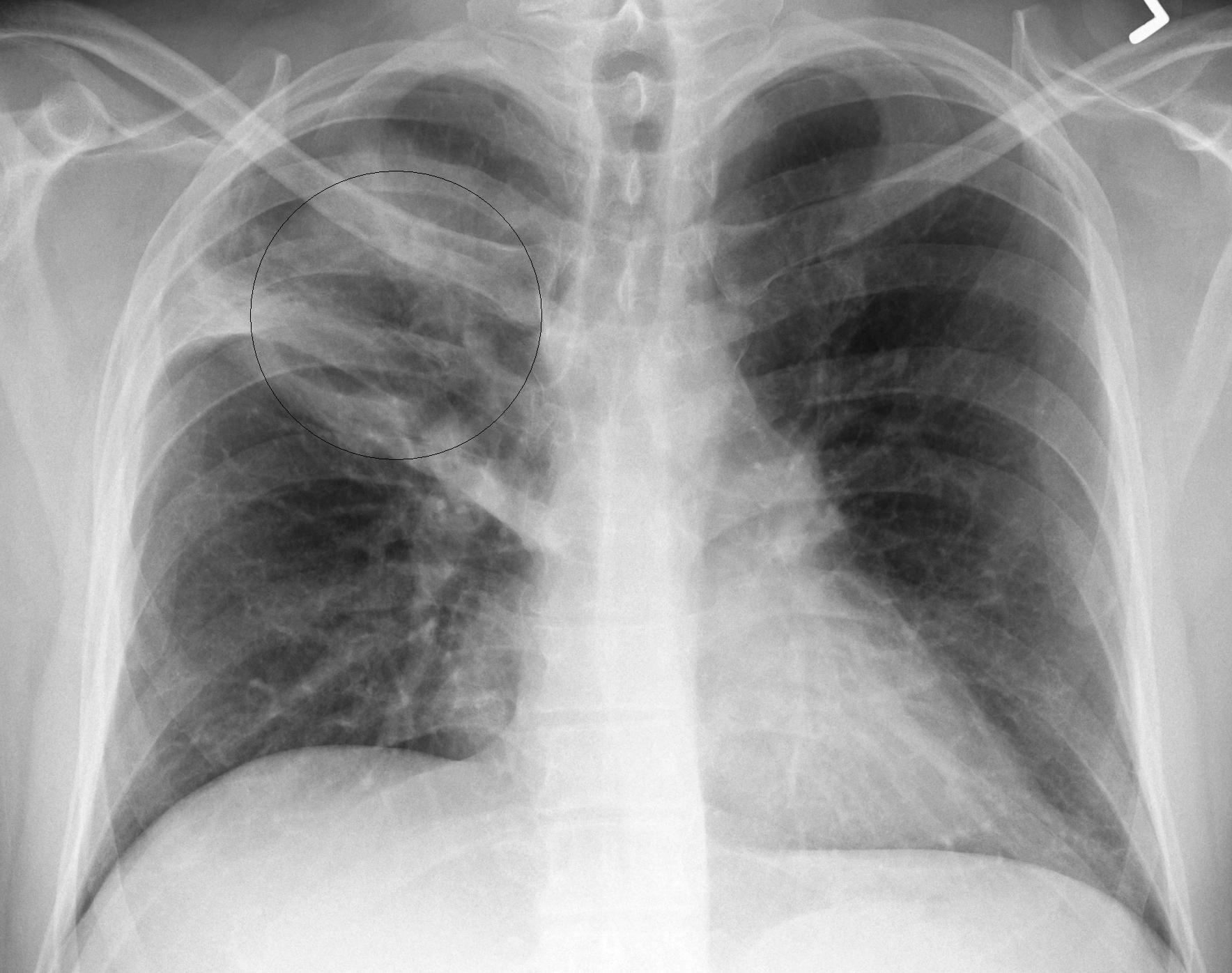
Right upper lobe pneumonia as marked by the circle.

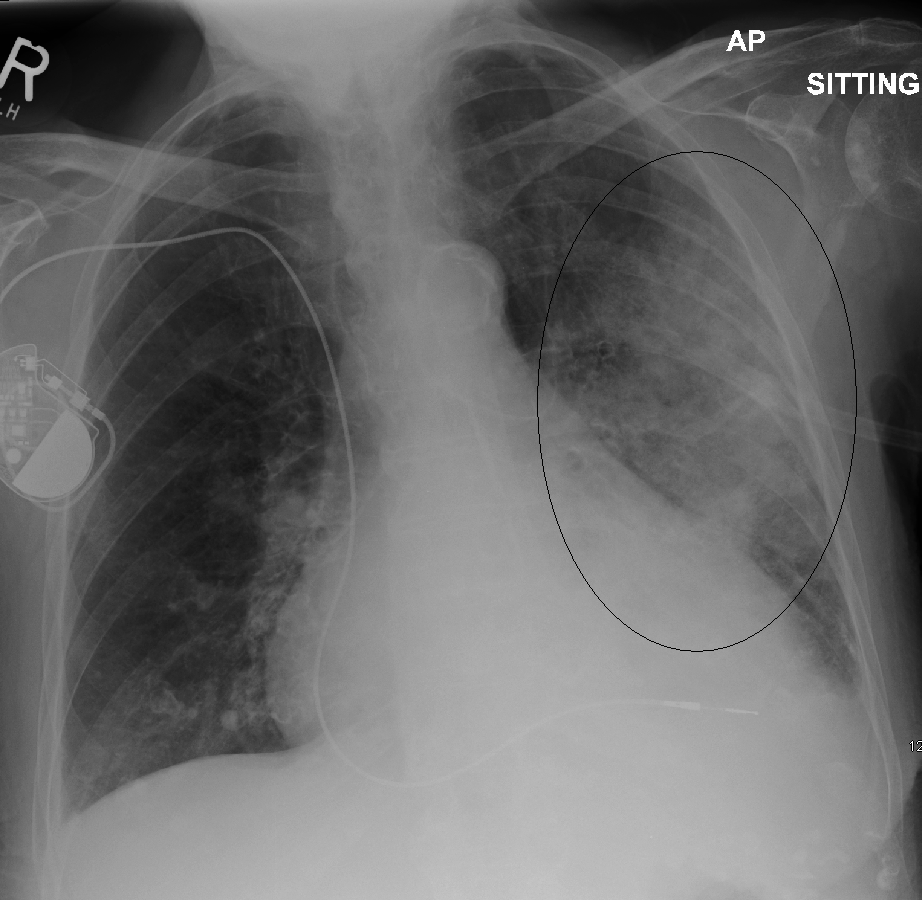
Left upper lobe pneumonia with a small pleural effusion.

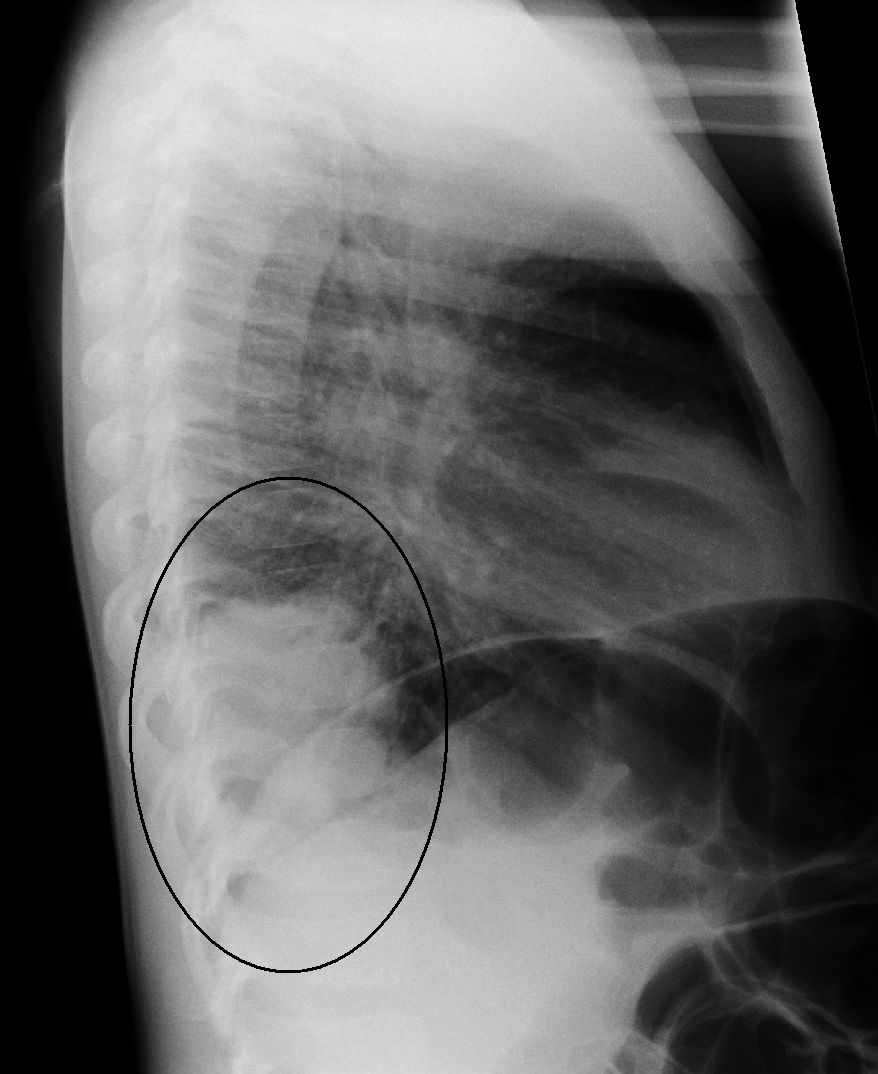
Right lower lobe pneumonia as seen on a lateral CXR

== Clinical ==
Traditionally, clinicians have classified pneumonia by clinical characteristics, dividing them into "acute" (less than three weeks duration) and "chronic" pneumonias. This is useful because chronic pneumonias tend to be either non-infectious, or mycobacterial, fungal, or mixed bacterial infections caused by airway obstruction. Acute pneumonias are further divided into the classic bacterial bronchopneumonias (such as Streptococcus pneumoniae), the atypical pneumonias (such as the interstitial pneumonitis of Mycoplasma pneumoniae or Chlamydia pneumoniae), and the aspiration pneumonia syndromes.

Chronic pneumonias, on the other hand, mainly include those of Nocardia, Actinomyces and Blastomyces dermatitidis, as well as the granulomatous pneumonias (Mycobacterium tuberculosis and atypical mycobacteria, Histoplasma capsulatum and Coccidioides immitis).

The combined clinical classification, now the most commonly used classification scheme, attempts to identify a person's risk factors when he or she first comes to medical attention. The advantage of this classification scheme over previous systems is that it can help guide the selection of appropriate initial treatments even before the microbiologic cause of the pneumonia is known. There are two broad categories of pneumonia in this scheme: community-acquired pneumonia and hospital-acquired pneumonia. A recently introduced type of healthcare-associated pneumonia (in patients living outside the hospital who have recently been in close contact with the health care system) lies between these two categories.
