= Mendelson's syndrome =

Chemical pneumonitis or aspiration pneumonitis caused by aspiration during anaesthesia

- Specialty: Pneumonology

Mendelson's syndrome, named in 1946 for American obstetrician and cardiologist Curtis Lester Mendelson, is a form of chemical pneumonitis or aspiration pneumonitis caused by aspiration of stomach contents (principally gastric acid) during anaesthesia in childbirth. This complication of anaesthesia led, in part, to the longstanding nil per os (abbr. NPO; a Latin phrase meaning nothing by mouth) recommendation for women in labour.

== Presentation ==
Mendelson's syndrome is characterised by a bronchopulmonary reaction following aspiration of gastric contents during general anaesthesia due to abolition of the laryngeal reflexes. The main clinical features are signs of general hypoxia, two to five hours after anaesthesia. Such features may include cyanosis, dyspnea, fever, pulmonary wheeze, crepitant rales, rhonchi, and tachycardia with a low blood pressure. Decreased arterial oxygen tension is also likely to be evident. Pulmonary edema can cause sudden death or death may occur later from pulmonary complications.

== Risk factors ==
Historically it is said that a patient is at risk if they have:

- Residual gastric volume of greater than 25ml, with
- pH of less than 2.5

However these are indirect measurements and are not factors that directly influence aspiration risk.

Patients with a high risk should have a rapid sequence induction. High risk is defined as these factors:

1. Non-elective surgical procedure
2. Light anaesthesia/unexpected response to stimulation
3. Acute or chronic, upper or lower GI pathology
4. Obesity
5. Opioid medication
6. Neurological disease, impaired conscious level, or sedation
7. Lithotomy position
8. Difficult intubation/airway
9. Gastrointestinal reflux
10. Hiatal hernia

== Eponym ==
It is named for Curtis Mendelson.
