= Intratracheal instillation =

Introduction of a substance directly into the trachea

Intratracheal instillation is the introduction of a substance directly into the trachea. It is widely used to test the respiratory toxicity of a substance as an alternative to inhalation in animal testing. Intratracheal instillation was reported as early as 1923 in studies of the carcinogenicity of coal tar. Modern methodology was developed by several research groups in the 1970s. By contrast, tracheal administration of pharmaceutical drugs in humans is called endotracheal administration.

== Background ==
As compared to inhalation, intratracheal instillation allows greater control over the dose and location of the substance, is cheaper and less technically demanding, allows lower amounts of scarce or expensive substances to be used, allows substances to be tested that can be inhaled by humans but not small mammals, and minimizes exposure to laboratory workers and to the skin of laboratory animals. Disadvantages include its nonphysiological and invasive nature, the confounding effects of the delivery vehicle and anesthesia, and the fact that it bypasses the upper respiratory tract. Instillation results in a less uniform distribution of the substance than inhalation, and the substance is cleared from the respiratory tract more slowly. Their results provide a quick screen of potential toxicity and can be used to test its mechanism, but may not be directly applicable to occupational exposure that occurs over an extended period. Some of these difficulties are overcome by another method, pharyngeal aspiration, which is less technically difficult and causes less trauma to the animal, and has a pulmonary deposition pattern more similar to inhalation.

== Methodology ==
Intratracheal instillation is often performed with mice, rats, or hamsters, with hamsters often preferred because their mouth can be opened widely to aid viewing the procedure, and because they are more resistant to lung diseases than rats. Instillation is performed either through inserting a needle or catheter down the mouth and throat, or through surgically exposing the trachea and penetrating it with a needle. Generally, short-acting inhaled anesthetic drugs such as halothane, metaphane, or enflurane are used during the instillation procedure. Saline solution is usually used as a delivery vehicle in a typical volume of 1–2 mL/kg body weight. A wide range of substances can be tested, including both soluble materials and insoluble particles or fibers, including nanomaterials.

== See also ==
- Tracheal intubation
