= Pharynx =

Part of the throat that is behind the mouth and nasal cavity

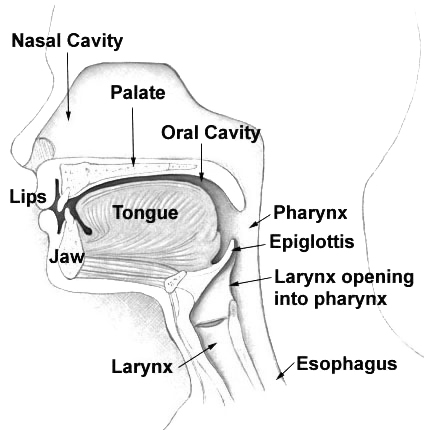
- Head and inner neck

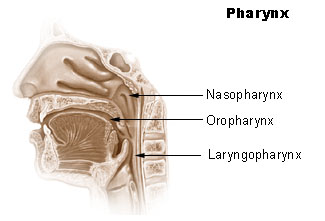
- Pharynx

Details
- Part of: Throat
- System: Respiratory system, digestive system
- Artery: Pharyngeal branches of ascending pharyngeal artery, ascending palatine, descending palatine, pharyngeal branches of inferior thyroid
- Vein: Pharyngeal plexus
- Nerve: Pharyngeal plexus of vagus nerve, recurrent laryngeal nerve, maxillary nerve, mandibular nerve

Identifiers
- Latin: pharynx
- Greek: φάρυγξ (phárynx)
- MeSH: D010614
- TA98: A05.3.01.001
- TA2: 2855
- FMA: 46688

The pharynx (pl.: pharynges) is the part of the throat behind the mouth and nasal cavity, and above the esophagus and trachea (the tubes going down to the stomach and the lungs respectively). It is found in vertebrates and invertebrates, though its structure can vary across species. The pharynx carries food to the esophagus and air to the larynx. The flap of cartilage called the epiglottis stops food from entering the larynx.

In humans, the pharynx is part of the digestive system and the conducting zone of the respiratory system. (The conducting zone—which also includes the nostrils of the nose, the larynx, trachea, bronchi, and bronchioles—filters, warms, and moistens air and conducts it into the lungs). The human pharynx is conventionally divided into three sections: the nasopharynx, oropharynx, and laryngopharynx (hypopharynx).

In humans, two sets of pharyngeal muscles form the pharynx and determine the shape of its lumen. They are arranged as an inner layer of longitudinal muscles, and an outer circular layer of pharyngeal constrictor muscles.

== Structure ==
=== Nasopharynx ===
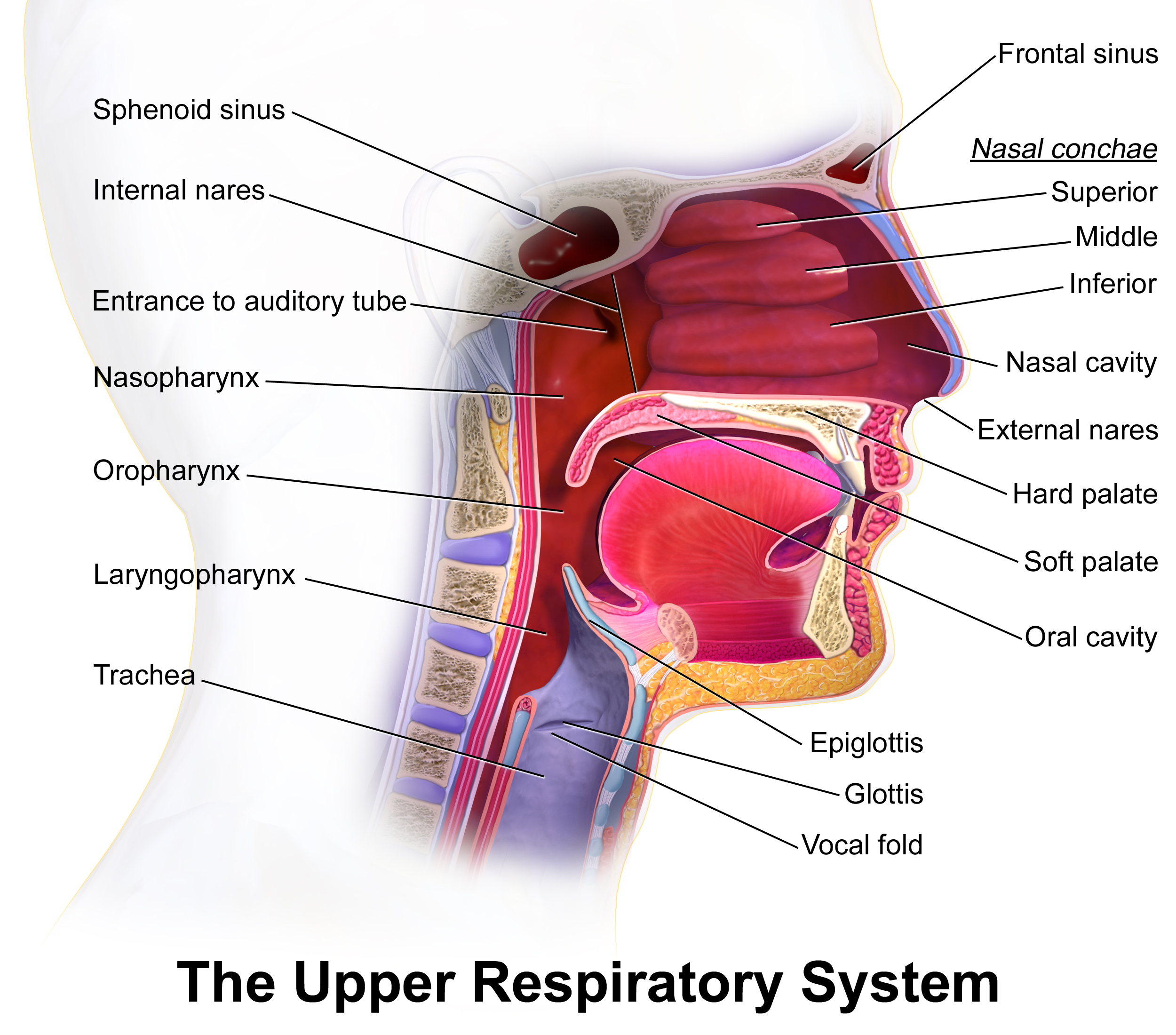
Upper respiratory system, with the nasopharynx, oropharynx and laryngopharynx labeled at left

The upper portion of the pharynx, the nasopharynx, extends from the base of the skull to the upper surface of the soft palate. It includes the space between the internal nares and the soft palate and lies above the oral cavity. The adenoids, also known as the pharyngeal tonsils, are lymphoid tissue structures located in the posterior wall of the nasopharynx. Waldeyer's tonsillar ring is an annular arrangement of lymphoid tissue in both the nasopharynx and oropharynx. The nasopharynx is lined by respiratory epithelium that is pseudostratified, columnar, and ciliated.

Polyps or mucus can obstruct the nasopharynx, as can congestion due to an upper respiratory infection. The auditory tube, which connects the middle ear to the pharynx, opens into the nasopharynx at the pharyngeal opening of the auditory tube. The opening and closing of the auditory tubes serves to equalize the barometric pressure in the middle ear with that of the ambient atmosphere.

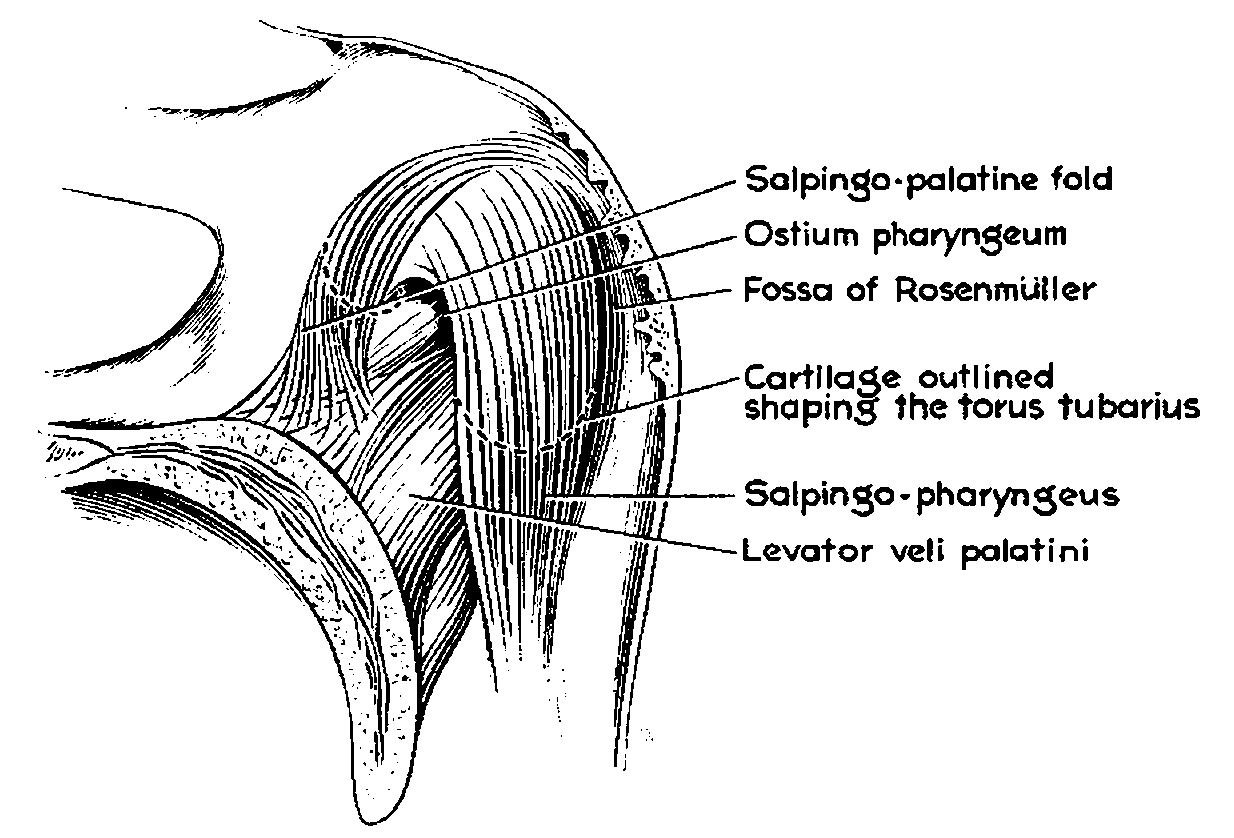
Details of torus tubarius

The anterior aspect of the nasopharynx communicates through the choanae with the nasal cavities. On its lateral wall is the pharyngeal opening of the auditory tube, somewhat triangular in shape and bounded behind by a firm prominence, the torus tubarius or cushion, caused by the medial end of the cartilage of the tube that elevates the mucous membrane. Two folds arise from the cartilaginous opening:

- the salpingopharyngeal fold, a vertical fold of mucous membrane extending from the inferior part of the torus and containing the salpingopharyngeus muscle.
- the salpingopalatine fold, a smaller fold, in front of the salpingopharyngeal fold, extending from the superior part of the torus to the palate and containing the salpingopalatine muscle. The tensor veli palatini and levator veli palatini are lateral to the fold and do not contribute.

=== Oropharynx ===
The oropharynx lies behind the oral cavity, extending from the uvula to the level of the hyoid bone. It opens anteriorly, through the isthmus faucium, into the mouth, while in its lateral wall, between the palatoglossal arch and the palatopharyngeal arch, is the palatine tonsil. The anterior wall consists of the base of the tongue and the epiglottic vallecula; the lateral wall is made up of the tonsil, tonsillar fossa, and tonsillar (faucial) pillars; the superior wall consists of the inferior surface of the soft palate and the uvula. Because both food and air pass through the pharynx, a flap of connective tissue called the epiglottis closes over the glottis when food is swallowed to prevent aspiration. The oropharynx is lined by non-keratinized squamous stratified epithelium.

The HACEK organisms (Haemophilus, Actinobacillus actinomycetemcomitans, Cardiobacterium hominis, Eikenella corrodens, Kingella) are part of the normal oropharyngeal flora, which grow slowly, prefer a carbon dioxide-enriched atmosphere, and share an enhanced capacity to produce endocardial infections, especially in young children. Fusobacterium is a pathogen.

=== Laryngopharynx ===
The laryngopharynx, (Latin: pars laryngea pharyngis), also known as hypopharynx, is the caudal part of the pharynx; it is the part of the throat that connects to the esophagus. It lies inferior to the epiglottis and extends to the location where this common pathway diverges into the respiratory (laryngeal) and digestive (esophageal) pathways. At that point, the laryngopharynx is continuous with the esophagus posteriorly. The esophagus conducts food and fluids to the stomach; air enters the larynx anteriorly. During swallowing, food has the "right of way", and air passage temporarily stops. Corresponding roughly to the area located between the 4th and 6th cervical vertebrae, the superior boundary of the laryngopharynx is at the level of the hyoid bone. The laryngopharynx includes three major sites: the pyriform sinus, postcricoid area, and the posterior pharyngeal wall. Like the oropharynx above it, the laryngopharynx serves as a passageway for food and air and is lined with a stratified squamous epithelium. It is innervated by the pharyngeal plexus and by the recurrent laryngeal nerve.

The vascular supply to the laryngopharynx includes the superior thyroid artery, the lingual artery and the ascending pharyngeal artery. The primary neural supply is from both the vagus and glossopharyngeal nerves. The vagus nerve provides an auricular branch also termed "Arnold's nerve" which also supplies the external auditory canal, thus laryngopharyngeal cancer can result in referred ear pain. This nerve is also responsible for the ear-cough reflex in which stimulation of the ear canal results in a person coughing.

== Function ==
The pharynx moves food from the mouth to the esophagus. It also moves air from the nasal and oral cavities to the larynx. It is also used in human speech, as pharyngeal consonants are articulated here, and it acts as a resonating chamber during phonation.

== Clinical significance ==
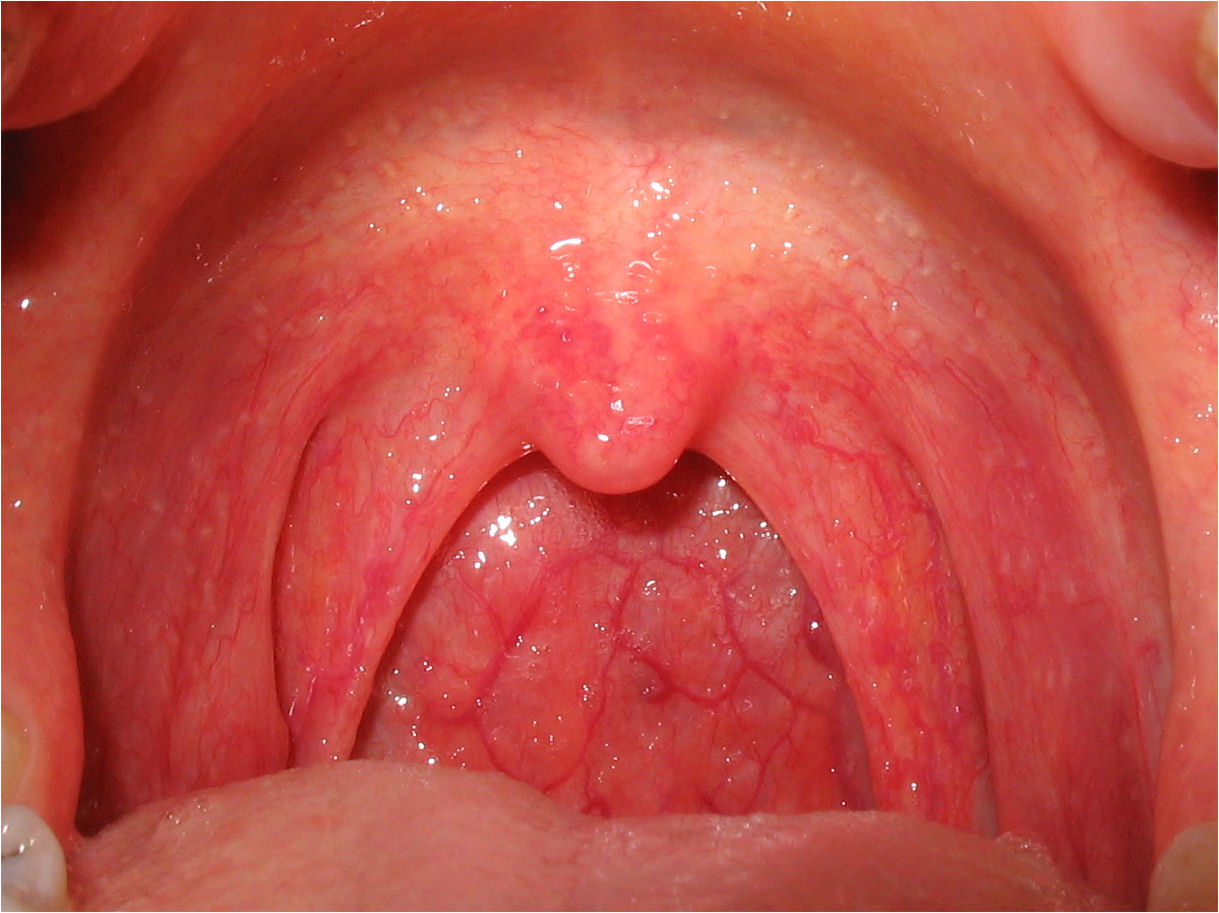
Pharyngitis is the painful swelling of the throat. The oropharynx shown here is very inflamed and red.

=== Inflammation ===
Inflammation of the pharynx, or pharyngitis, is the painful inflammation of the throat.

=== Pharyngeal cancer ===
Pharyngeal cancer is a cancer that originates in the neck and/or throat.

=== Waldeyer's tonsillar ring ===
Waldeyer's tonsillar ring is an anatomical term collectively describing the annular arrangement of lymphoid tissue in the pharynx. Waldeyer's ring circumscribes the naso and oropharynx, with some of its tonsillar tissue located above and some below the soft palate (and to the back of the oral cavity). It is believed that Waldeyer's ring prevents the invasion of microorganisms from going into the air and food passages and this helps in the defense mechanism of the respiratory and alimentary systems.

== Etymology ==
The word pharynx (/ˈfærɪŋks/) is derived from the Greek φάρυγξ phárynx, meaning "throat". Its plural form is pharynges /fəˈrɪndʒiːz/ or pharynxes /ˈfærɪŋksəz/, and its adjective form is pharyngeal (/ˌfærɪnˈdʒiːəl/ or /fəˈrɪndʒiəl/).

== Other vertebrates ==
All vertebrates have a pharynx, used in both feeding and respiration. The pharynx arises during development in all vertebrates through a series of six or more outpocketings on the lateral sides of the head. These outpocketings are pharyngeal arches, and they give rise to a number of different structures in the skeletal, muscular, and circulatory systems. The structure of the pharynx varies across the vertebrates. It differs in dogs, horses, and ruminants. In dogs, a single duct connects the nasopharynx to the nasal cavity. The tonsils are a compact mass that points away from the lumen of the pharynx. In the horse, the auditory tube opens into the guttural pouch and the tonsils are diffuse and raised slightly. Horses are unable to breathe through the mouth as the free apex of the rostral epiglottis lies dorsal to the soft palate in a normal horse. In ruminants, the tonsils are a compact mass that points towards the lumen of the pharynx.

=== Pharyngeal arches ===
Pharyngeal arches are characteristic features of vertebrates whose origin can be traced back through chordates to basal deuterostomes who also share endodermal outpocketings of the pharyngeal apparatus. Similar patterns of gene expression can be detected in the developing pharynx of amphioxi and hemichordates. However, the vertebrate pharynx is unique in that it gives rise to endoskeletal support through the contribution of neural crest cells.

=== Pharyngeal jaws ===
An illustration of the pharyngeal jaws of a moray eel

Pharyngeal jaws are a "second set" of jaws contained within the pharynx of many species of fish, distinct from the primary (oral) jaws. Pharyngeal jaws have been studied in moray eels where their specific action is noted. When the moray bites prey, it first bites normally with its oral jaws, capturing the prey. Immediately thereafter, the pharyngeal jaws are brought forward and bite down on the prey to grip it; they then retract, pulling the prey down the eel's esophagus, allowing it to be swallowed.

== Invertebrates ==
Invertebrates also have a pharynx. Invertebrates with a pharynx include the tardigrades, annelids and arthropods, and the priapulids (which have an eversible pharynx).

The "pharynx" of the nematode worm is a muscular food pump in the head, triangular in cross-section, that grinds food and transports it directly to the intestines. A one-way valve connects the pharynx to the excretory canal.

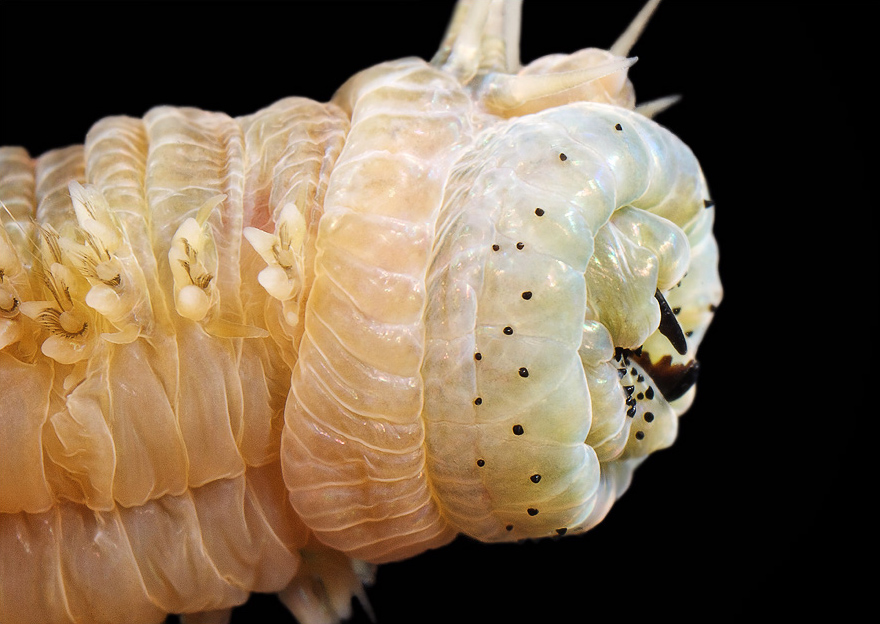
Everted pharynx of Alitta virens (also known as Nereis virens), lateral view

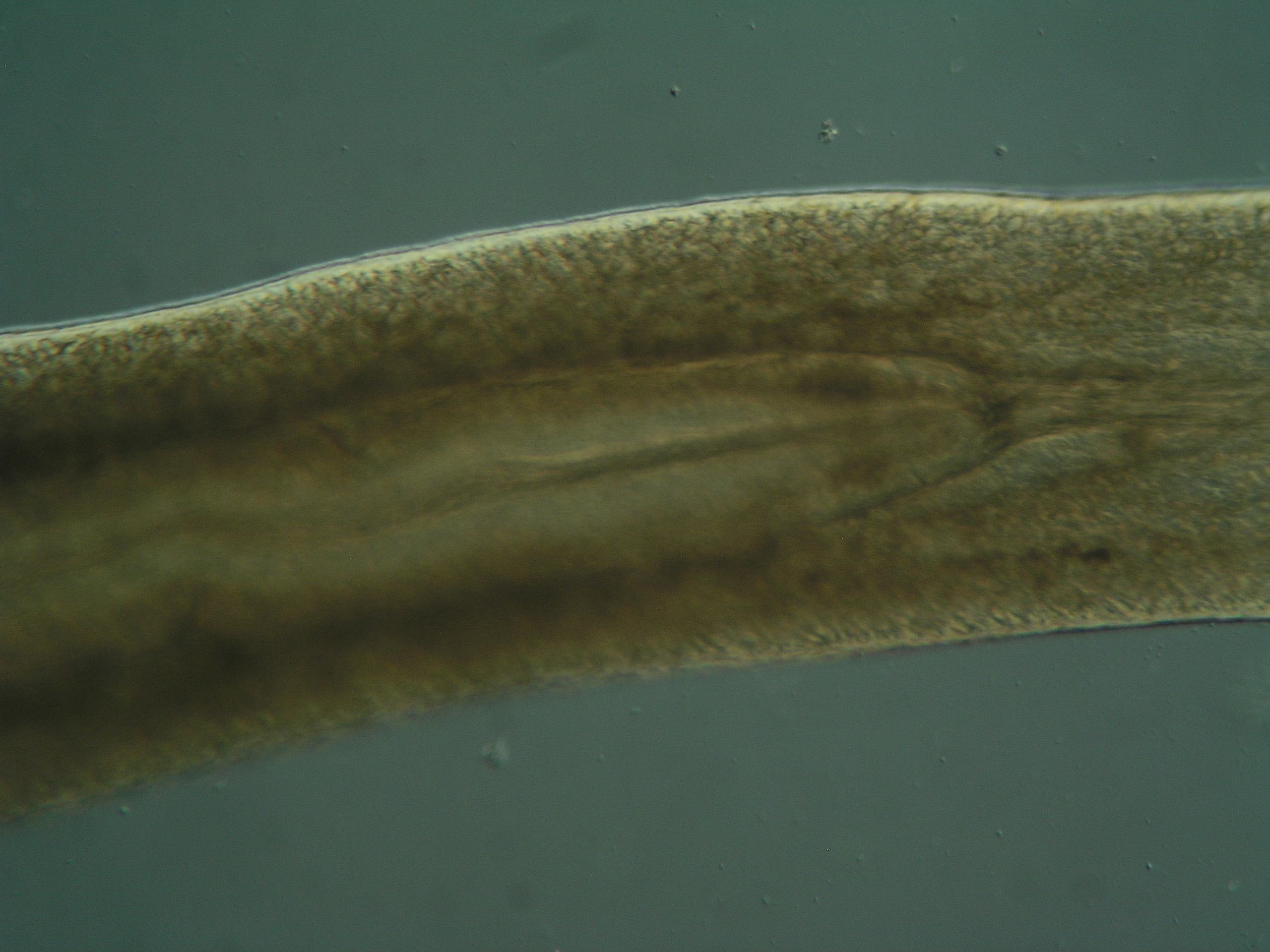
Pharynx of the flatworm Prorhynchus fontinalis

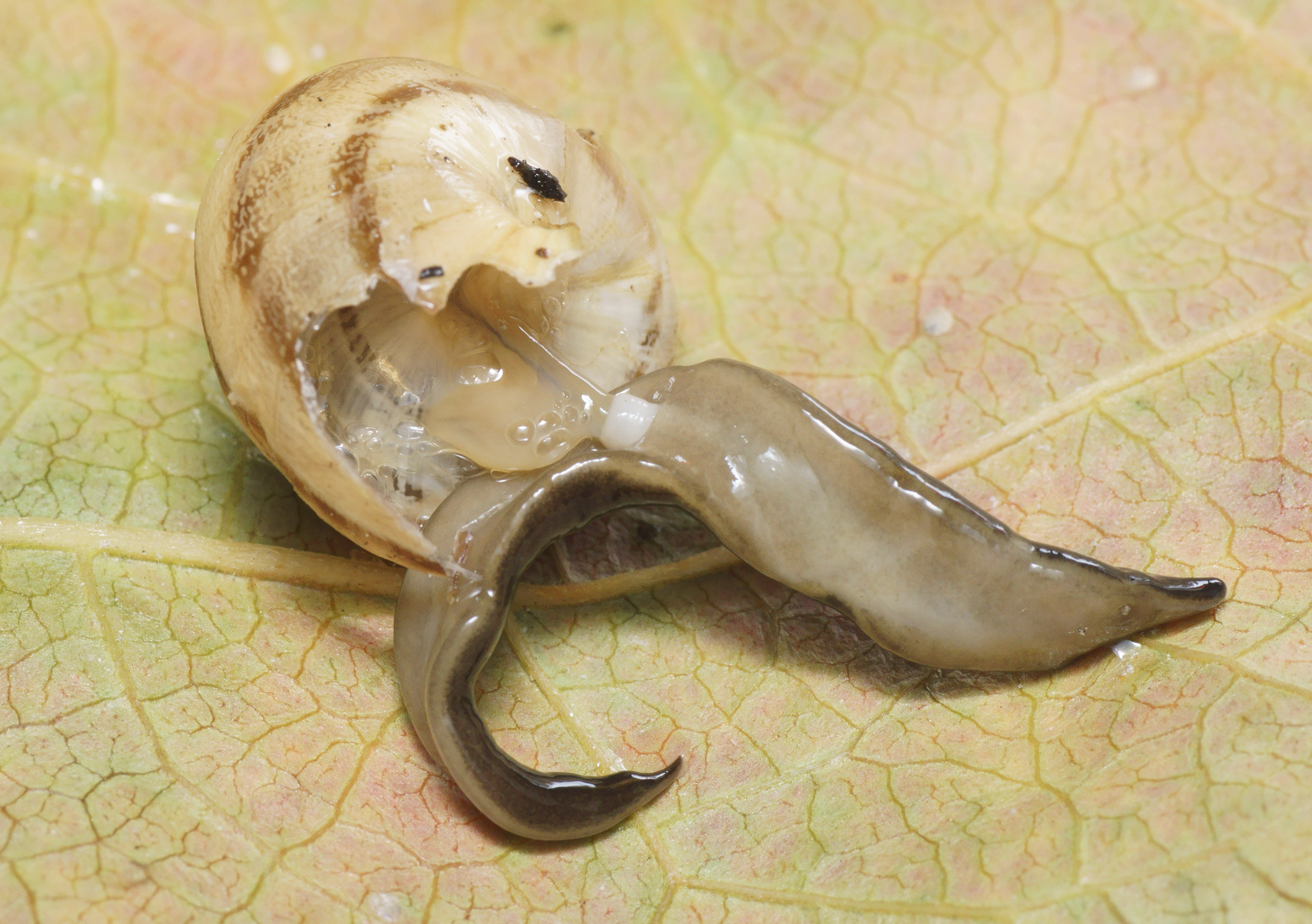
Pharynx of the flatworm Platydemus manokwari visible as the worm feeds on a snail

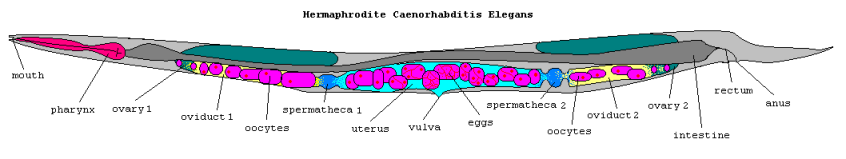
Longitudinal section through the roundworm Caenorhabditis elegans showing the position of the pharynx in the animal body

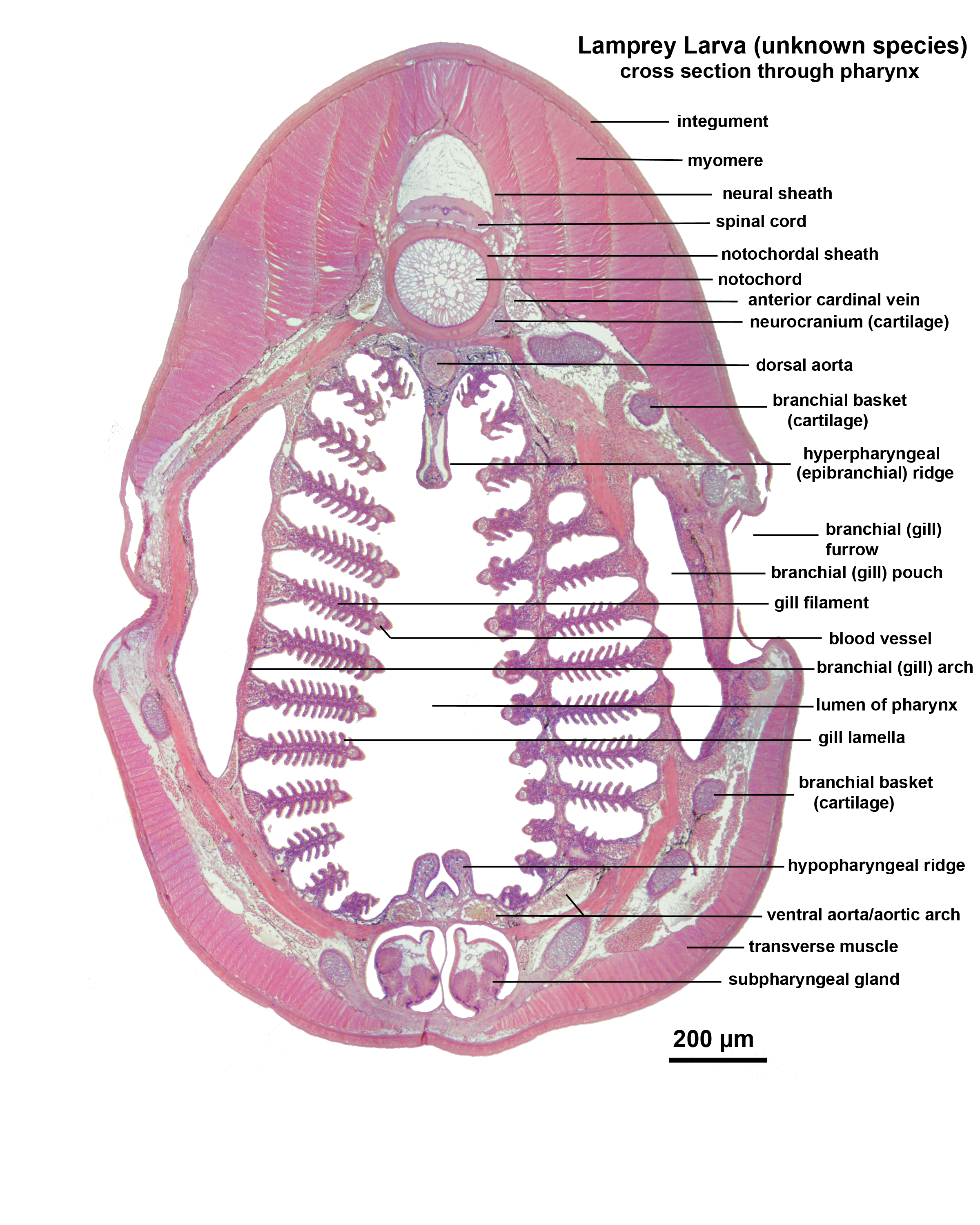
Microscopic cross section through the pharynx of a larva from an unknown lamprey species

== Additional images ==
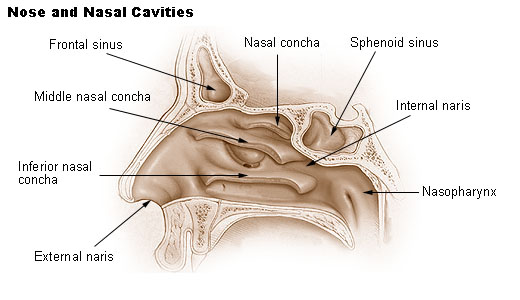
Nose and nasal

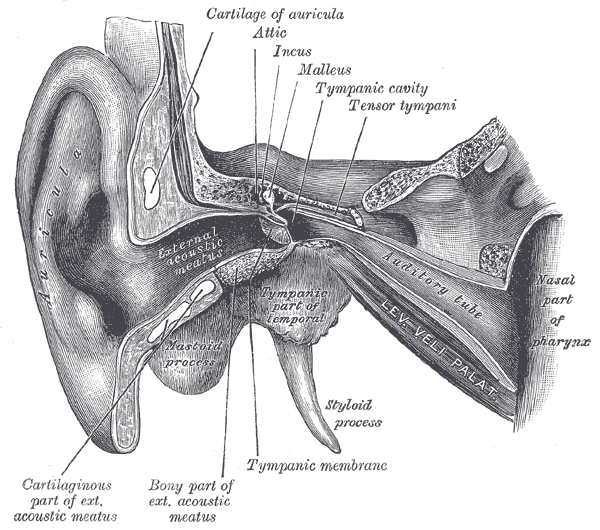
Coronal section of right ear, showing auditory tube and levator veli palatini muscle

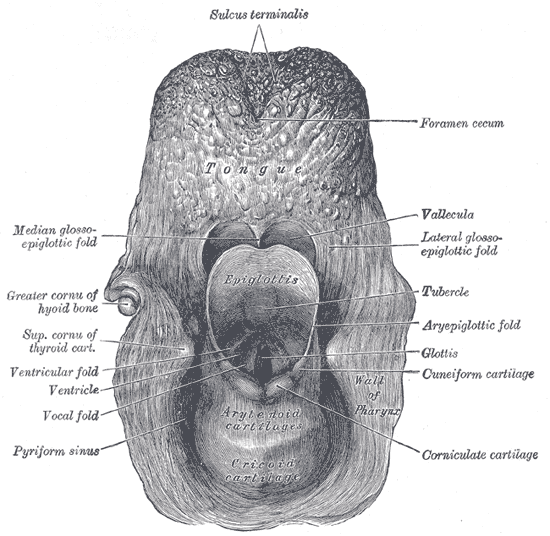
The entrance to the larynx, viewed from behind

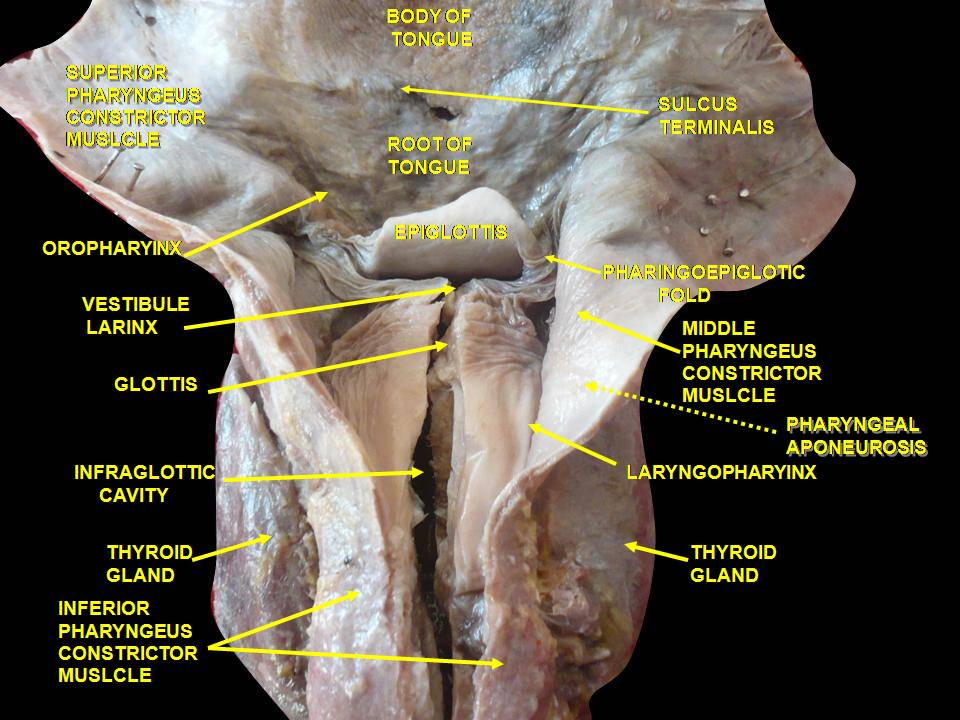
Deep dissection of human larynx, pharynx and tongue seen from behind

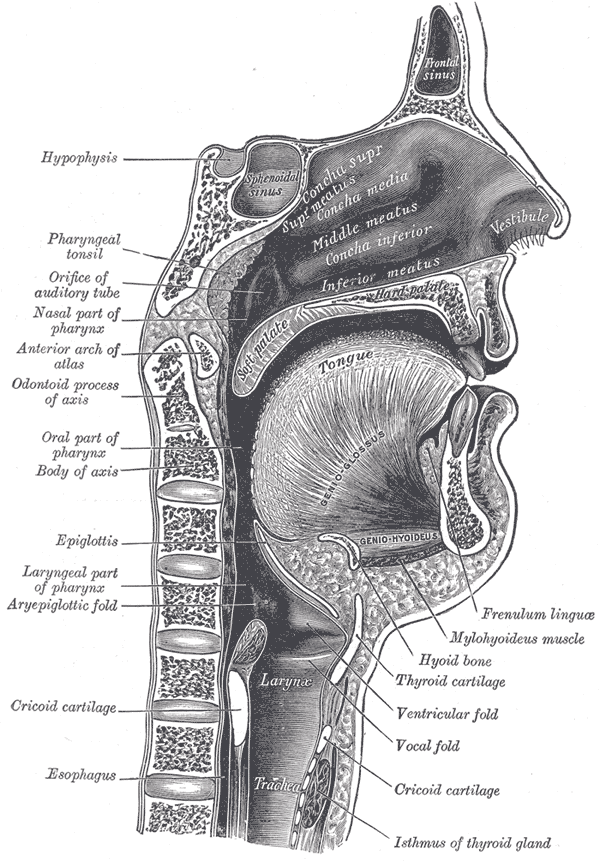
The nasopharynx, oropharynx, and laryngopharynx or larynx can be seen clearly in this sagittal section of the head and neck.

== See also ==
- Cricopharyngeal ligament
- Nasopharyngeal carcinoma
- Pharyngeal aspiration
- Pharyngeal consonant
- Pharyngeal (disambiguation)
- Saccopharynx, a genus of deep-sea eel-like fishes with large mouths, distensible stomachs and long scaleless bodies
- Salpinx in anatomy
- Tonsil
- Tornwaldt cyst
