= Cricopharyngeal ligament =

Ligament of the larynx and pharynx

Details
- From: cricoid
- To: pharynx

Identifiers
- Latin: ligamentum cricopharyngeum
- TA98: A06.2.04.017
- TA2: 1669
- FMA: 55260

The cricopharyngeal ligament extends from the cricoid lamina to the midline of the pharynx.
