= Pharyngeal aspiration =

Pharyngeal aspiration introduces a substance into the pharynx for aspiration into the lungs. It is less technically difficult than intratracheal instillation the pharynx is higher in the respiratory system than the trachea.

Pharyngeal aspiration is the introduction of a substance into the pharynx and its subsequent aspiration into the lungs. It is used to test the respiratory toxicity of a substance in animal testing. It began to be used in the late 1990s. Pharyngeal aspiration is widely used to study the toxicity of a wide variety of substances, including nanomaterials such as carbon nanotubes.

Pharyngeal aspiration has benefits over the alternative methods of inhalation and intratracheal instillation, the introduction of the substance directly into the trachea. Inhalation studies have the disadvantages that they are expensive and technically difficult, the dose and location of the substance has poor reproducibility, they require large amounts of material, and they potentially allow exposure to laboratory workers and to the skin of laboratory animals. Intratracheal instillation overcomes some of these difficulties, but because a needle or tube is needed to access the trachea, it remains technically challenging and causes trauma to the animal, which can be a confounding factor. It also results in a less uniform distribution of the substance than inhalation, and bypasses effects from the upper respiratory tract.

In pharyngeal aspiration, the substance is placed in the pharynx, which is higher in the respiratory tract, avoiding the major source of technical difficulty and trauma to the animal. The deposition pattern of pharyngeal aspiration is also more dispersed than that of intratracheal instillation, making it more similar to inhalation, and the lung responses are qualitatively similar. Nevertheless, pharyngeal aspiration still leads to more particle agglomeration than inhalation, making its effects less potent.

== Methodology ==
Pharyngeal aspiration is often performed on mice and rats. Prior to introduction of the stubstance, the animal is anesthetized and its tongue extended, preventing the animal from swallowing the material and allowing it to be aspirated into the lungs over the course of at least two deep breaths. A liquid suspension of particles in saline solution is usually used, in a typical volume of 50 μL. Sometimes the substance is introduced into the larynx instead of the pharynx to avoid contamination from food particles and other contaminants present in the mouth.
