= Pharyngeal =

Pharyngeal may refer to:

== Anatomy ==
- Pharynx, for pharyngeal anatomy
- Pharyngeal muscles
  - Superior pharyngeal constrictor muscle
  - Middle pharyngeal constrictor muscle
  - Inferior pharyngeal constrictor muscle
- Pharyngeal artery
- Pharyngeal slit
- Pharyngeal tonsil, a mass of lymphoid tissue in the pharynx

== Other ==
- Pharyngeal consonant, for pharyngeal sounds in phonetics
