= Salpinx in anatomy =

In anatomical contexts, salpinx is used to refer to a type of tube. Per Terminologia Anatomica, the Latin term "tuba" is usually used to describe most tubes (after the Roman tuba, not the modern tuba), but the term "salpinges" and its adjectival derivatives are still sometimes used to describe the following two "tubes":

- Fallopian tube (as in mesosalpinx, salpingitis and hydrosalpinx)
- Eustachian tube (as in salpingopalatine fold, salpingopharyngeal fold, and salpingopharyngeus muscle)
