= Curtis Lester Mendelson =

American cardiologist and obstetrician (1913–2002)

- Born: September 4, 1913; New York City, New York, U.S.
- Died: October 13, 2002 (aged 89); West Palm Beach, Florida, U.S.
- Known for: Mendelson's syndrome
- Scientific career
- Fields: obstetrics, anaesthetist

Curtis Lester Mendelson (September 4, 1913 - October 13, 2002) was an obstetrician and American cardiologist. Mendelson's syndrome was named after him in 1946.
