= Pulmonary aspiration =

Entry of materials into the larynx (voice box) and lower respiratory tract

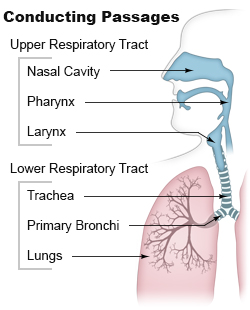
- Diagram of the upper respiratory tract.
- Specialty: Emergency Medicine, Anesthesiology, Neurology, Pulmonology
- Symptoms: Wheezing, Coughing, Shortness of breath
- Complications: Aspiration pneumonia, Chemical pneumonitis, Death

Pulmonary aspiration is the entry of solid or liquid material such as pharyngeal secretions, food, drink, or stomach contents from the oropharynx or gastrointestinal tract, into the trachea and lungs. When pulmonary aspiration occurs during eating and drinking, the aspirated material is often colloquially referred to as "going down the wrong pipe".

Consequences of pulmonary aspiration include no injury at all, chemical pneumonitis, pneumonia, or even death from asphyxiation. These consequences depend on the volume, chemical composition, particle size, and presence of infectious agents in the aspirated material, and on the underlying health status of the person.

In healthy people, aspiration of small quantities of material is common and rarely results in disease or injury. People with significant underlying disease or injury are at greater risk for developing respiratory complications following pulmonary aspiration, especially hospitalized patients, because of certain factors such as depressed level of consciousness and impaired airway defenses (gag reflex and respiratory tract antimicrobial defense system). About 3.6 million cases of pulmonary aspiration or foreign body in the airway occurred in 2013.

== Causes ==
=== Neurologic impairment ===
Any condition that results in depressed level of consciousness (such as traumatic brain injury, alcohol intoxication, drug overdose, medical sedation, stroke, and general anesthesia) can result in pulmonary aspiration of pharyngeal secretions. Neurologic conditions that affect muscle coordination and posture (such as cerebral palsy, Parkinson's disease, muscular dystrophies, etc.) can also increase risk of aspiration.

=== Respiratory disease ===
Respiratory diseases often result in an impaired ability to clear the airways of secretions, and present an increased risk of pulmonary aspiration. This includes those with a respiratory disease resulting in a weak cough, or poor forced expiratory volume. Any condition requiring mechanical ventilation is also at risk for aspiration.

=== Oropharyngeal disorders ===
Conditions which disrupt coordination of swallowing above the glottis put a patient at increased risk for aspiration. This is referred to as oropharyngeal dysphagia and can be a result of structural abnormalities (strictures, stenosis, mediastinal and neck masses, etc.), connective tissue diseases, neuropathy, or other central nervous system-related disorders (stroke, head injury, ALS, Guillain–Barré syndrome, etc.).

=== Medications ===
Drugs can increase a person's risk of aspiration through multiple mechanisms. Medications including sedatives, hypnotics, and antipsychotics can result in decreased level of consciousness and loss of cough and swallow reflexes. Long-term use of proton pump inhibitors can lead to overgrowth of gastric bacteria and increase risk of aspiration. Antihistamines and antidepressants can cause xerostomia (decreased oral secretions) which can also lead to aspiration.

=== Foreign-body aspiration ===
Particularly common in children, foreign-body aspiration occurs when an object is inhaled from the mouth into the airway. Objects commonly include food, coins, toys and balloons. Age and developmental delays are therefore also considered risk factors for aspiration. The lumen of the right main bronchus is more vertical and slightly wider than that of the left, so aspirated objects are more likely to end up in this bronchus or one of its subsequent bifurcations.

== Presentation ==
Uncomplicated aspiration events commonly present with symptoms including wheezing and coughing. Signs and symptoms that aspiration is complicated can include dyspnea (shortness of breath), hypoxemia (low oxygen in the blood), tachycardia (high heart rate), fever, and crackles or wheezes on lung exam.

== Evaluation ==
Evaluation and diagnosis of aspiration and aspiration-related complications may include imaging or laboratory studies.

=== Imaging ===
Radiologic studies may be done to image the chest wall, lungs, and airway to evaluate and diagnose conditions that may be contributing to aspiration, and also to diagnose complications of previous aspiration.

Chest X-rays can be useful in the diagnosis of aspiration pneumonia but may be negative early in the course. Chest CT Scan can identify the presence of a pneumonia as well, and can also assist in characterizing abscesses, foreign objects, or pleural disease.

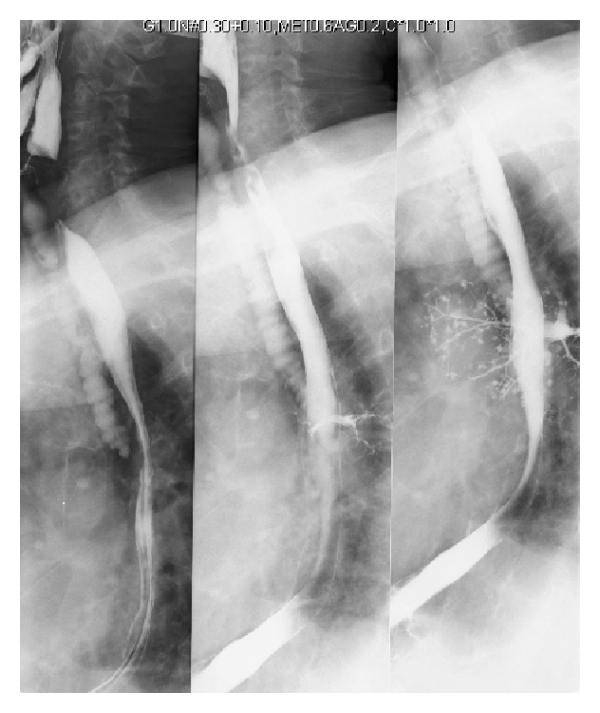
Aspiration seen on barium swallow study.

A fluoroscopic swallow study can be done in cases where dysphagia or motility disorders are thought to be the source of aspiration. Food and drink are mixed with barium contrast and monitored using x-ray to evaluate swallowing. Aspiration can be diagnosed if contrast is seen coursing below the vocal cords into the trachea.

=== Laboratory studies ===
Microbiologic studies may be obtained in the case of suspected aspiration-related pulmonary infection. Labs may include infectious cultures of patient blood, sputum, or pleural fluid depending on the patient case and clinical judgement of the treatment team.

== Complications ==
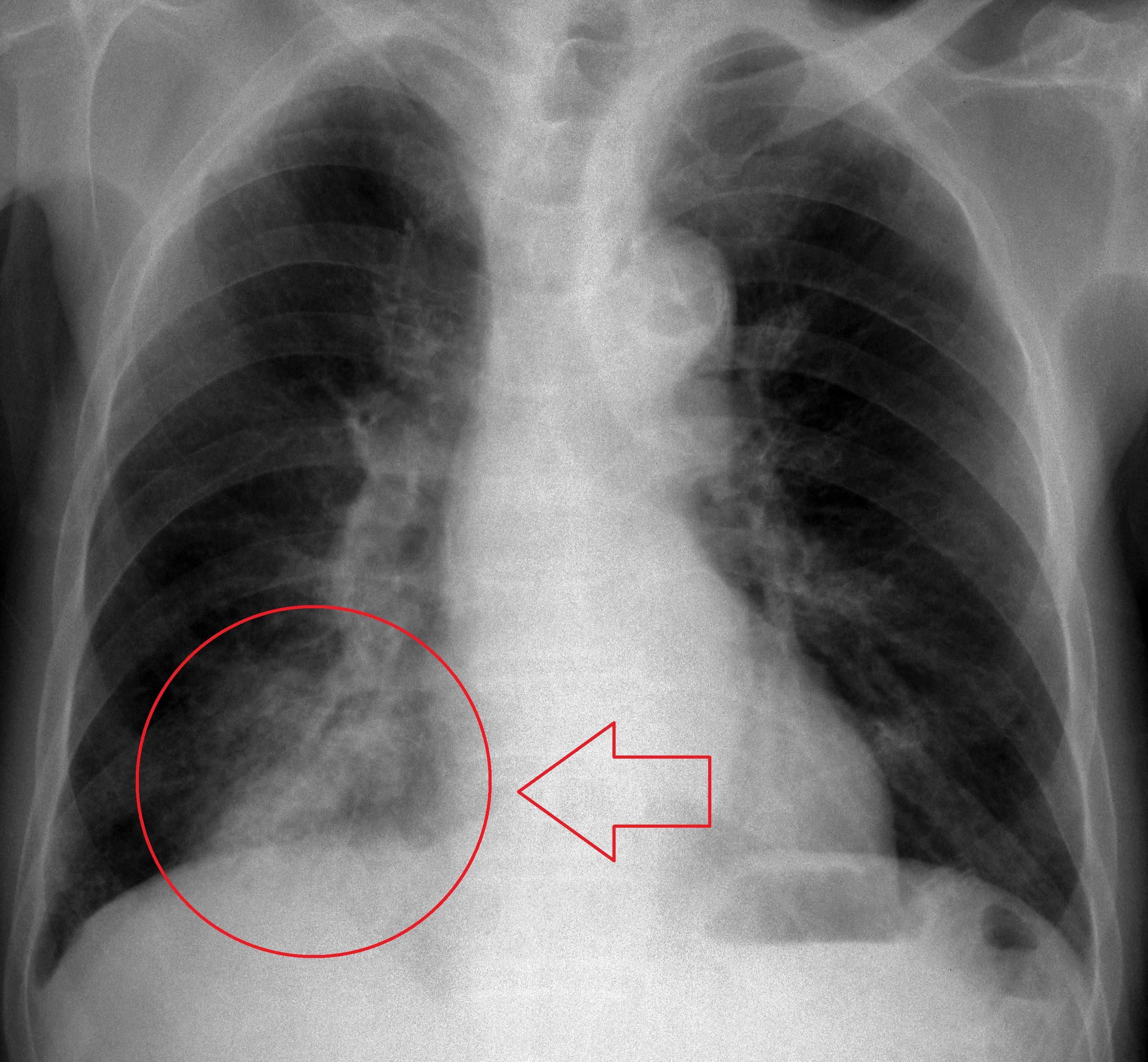
Aspiration pneumonia

=== Aspiration pneumonia ===
Aspiration pneumonia is when bacteria is carried into the respiratory tract via aspiration and subsequently causes an infection of the lung. Any substance or object that is aspirated into the airway has the potential of carrying infectious agents with it into the respiratory tract. It primarily affects older adults and can be especially severe in patients with learning disabilities, or disorders of abnormal swallowing.

=== Aspiration pneumonitis ===
Aspiration pneumonitis (Mendelson's syndrome) is chemical injury of lung tissue secondary to aspiration of regurgitated gastric acid. The syndrome was first described among pregnant patients after the administration of anesthesia, though it can occur in any scenario where gastric contents are aspirated.

=== Death ===
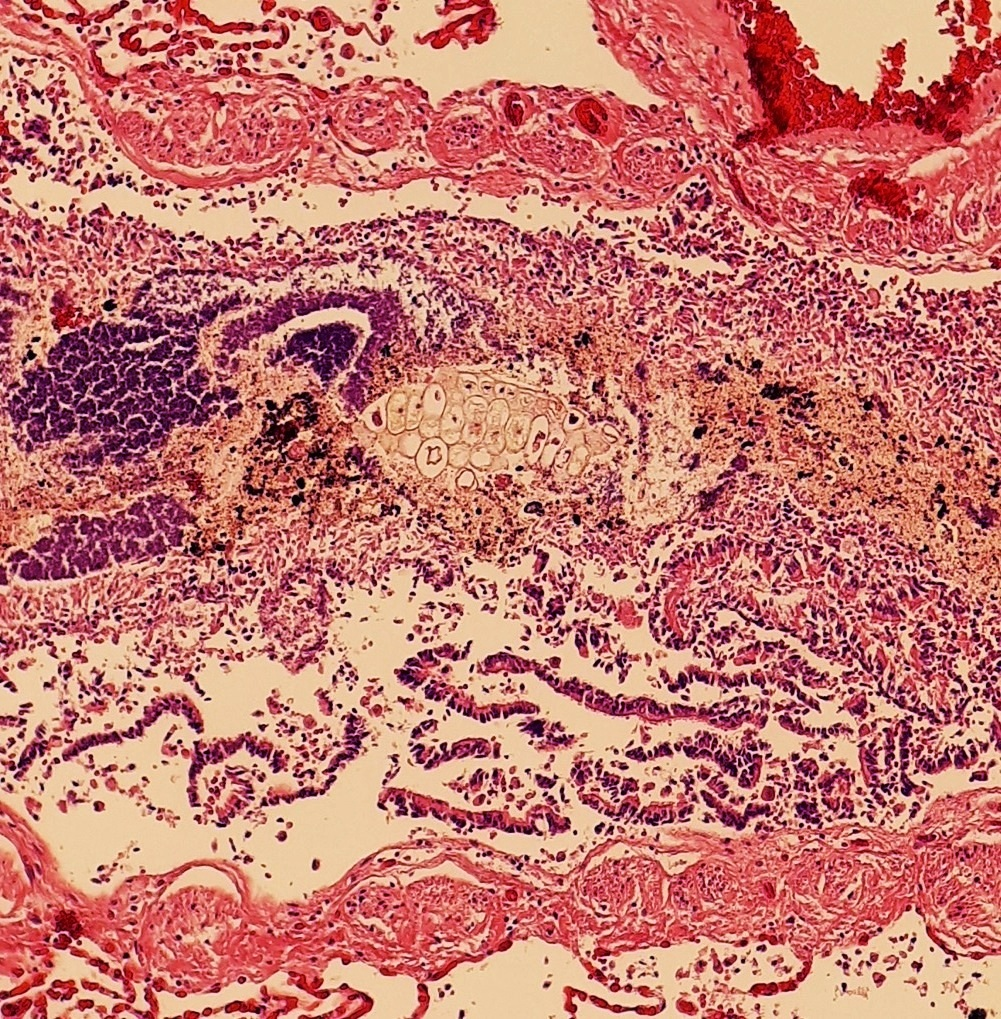
Histopathology of aspiration, taken from an autopsy, showing plant-like cells in a bronchiole. However, alveoli were clear, indicating a finding secondary to cardiopulmonary resuscitation rather than a primary cause of death.

Aspiration can result in patient death through a variety of mechanisms. It is important to recognize and diagnose early in order to improve patient outcomes. Death from aspiration and aspiration-related syndromes is most common in elderly patients with known baseline risk factors, though it frequently goes unrecognized.

== Prevention ==
The lungs are normally protected against aspiration by a series of protective reflexes such as coughing and swallowing. Significant aspiration can only occur if the protective reflexes are absent or severely diminished (in neurological disease, coma, drug overdose, sedation or general anesthesia). In intensive care, sitting patients upright reduces the risk of pulmonary aspiration and ventilator-associated pneumonia.

Measures to prevent aspiration depend on the situation and the patient. In patients at imminent risk of aspiration, tracheal intubation by a trained health professional provides the best protection. A simpler intervention that can be implemented is to lay the patient on their side in the recovery position (as taught in first aid and CPR classes), so that any vomitus produced by the patient will drain out their mouth instead of back down their pharynx. Some anesthetists will use sodium citrate to neutralize the stomach's low pH and metoclopramide or domperidone (pro-kinetic agents) to empty the stomach. In veterinary settings, emetics may be used to empty the stomach prior to sedation.

One strategy for prevention of aspiration in hospitalized patients with neurological disorders that impact swallowing is to place patients on a thickened fluids diet after swallowing assessment by a speech-language pathologist. However, the impact of diet-alteration is debated and may have an impact on patient quality of life. Also, pharyngeal residue is more common with very thickened fluids: this may subsequently be aspirated and lead to a more severe pneumonia.

== Management ==
See also: Choking § Treatment, Basic Life Support, Advanced Cardiovascular Life Support

Treatment of foreign body aspiration is determined by the age of the patient and the severity of obstruction of the airway involved.

=== Basic management ===
An airway obstruction can be partial or complete. In partial obstruction, the patient can usually clear the foreign body with coughing. In complete obstruction, acute intervention is required to remove the foreign body.

If foreign body aspiration is suspected, finger sweeping in the mouth is not recommended due to the increased risk of displacing the foreign object further into the airway.

For choking, children less than 1 year of age, need to be placed face down over the rescuer's arm. Back blows should be delivered with the heel of the hand, then the child should be turned face-up and chest thrusts should be administered. The rescuer should alternate five back blows followed by five chest thrusts until the object is cleared. The Heimlich maneuver should be used in choking patients older than 1 year of age to dislodge a foreign body. If the patient becomes unresponsive during physical intervention, cardiopulmonary resuscitation (CPR) should be started.

=== Advanced management ===
In the event that the basic measures do not remove the foreign body, and adequate ventilation cannot be restored, need for treatment by trained personnel becomes necessary. Laryngoscopy should be performed in unresponsive patients if non-invasive airway clearance techniques are unsuccessful. Laryngoscopy involves placing a device in the mouth to visualize the back of the airway. If the foreign body can be seen, it can be removed with forceps. An endotracheal tube should then be placed in order to prevent airway compromise from resulting inflammation after the procedure. If the foreign body cannot be visualized, intubation, tracheotomy, or needle cricothyrotomy can be done to restore an airway for patients who have become unresponsive due to airway compromise.

If non-invasive measures do not dislodge the foreign body, and the patient can maintain adequate ventilation, rigid bronchoscopy under general anesthesia should be performed. Supplemental oxygen, cardiac monitoring, and a pulse oximeter should be applied to the patient. Efforts should be made to keep the patient calm and avoid agitating the patient to prevent further airway compromise. Flexible rather than rigid bronchoscopy might be used when the diagnosis or object location are unclear. When flexible bronchoscope is used, rigid bronchoscope is typically on standby and readily available as this is the preferred approach for removal. Rigid bronchoscopy allows good airway control, ready bleeding management, better visualization, and ability to manipulate the aspirated object with a variety of forceps. Flexible bronchoscopy may be used for extraction when distal access is needed and the operator is experienced in this technique. Potential advantages include avoidance of general anesthesia as well as the ability to reach subsegmental bronchi which are smaller in diameter and further down the respiratory tract than the main bronchi. The main disadvantage of using a flexible scope is the risk of further dislodging the object and causing airway compromise. Bronchoscopy is successful in removing the foreign body in approximately 95% of cases with a complication rate of only 1%.

After the foreign body is removed, patients should receive nebulized beta-adrenergic medication and chest physiotherapy to further protect the airway. Steroidal anti-inflammatories and antibiotics are not routinely administered except in certain scenarios. These include situations such as when the foreign body is difficult or impossible to extract, when there is a documented respiratory tract infection, and when swelling within the airway occurs after removal of the object. Glucocorticoids may be administered when the foreign body is surrounded by inflamed tissue and extraction is difficult or impossible. In such cases, extraction may be delayed for a short course of glucocorticoids so that the inflammation may be reduced before subsequent attempts. These patients should remain under observation in the hospital until successful extraction as this practice can result in dislodgement of the foreign body. Antibiotics are appropriate when an infection has developed but should not delay extraction. In fact, removal of the object may improve infection control by removing the infectious source as well as using cultures taken during the bronchoscopy to guide antibiotic choice. When airway edema or swelling occur, the patient may have stridor. In these cases, glucocorticoids, aerosolized epinephrine, or helium oxygen therapy may be considered as part of the management plan.

Patients who are clinically stable with no need for supplemental oxygen after extraction may be discharged from the hospital the same day as the procedure. Routine imaging such as a follow-up chest x-ray are not needed unless symptoms persist or worsen, or if the patient had imaging abnormalities previously to verify return to normal. Most children are discharged within 24 hours of the procedure.

== See also ==
- Drowning
- Foreign body aspiration
- Pharyngeal aspiration
- Salt water aspiration syndrome
