= Chemical pneumonitis =

Inflammation of the lung caused by aspirating or inhaling irritants

- Specialty: Pulmonology

Chemical pneumonitis is inflammation of the lung caused by aspirating or inhaling irritants. It is sometimes called a "chemical pneumonia", though it is not infectious. There are two general types of chemical pneumonitis: acute and chronic.

Irritants capable of causing chemical pneumonitis include vomitus, barium used in gastro-intestinal imaging, chlorine gas (among other pulmonary agents), ingested gasoline or other petroleum distillates, ingested or skin absorbed pesticides, gases from electroplating, smoke and others. It may also be caused by the use of inhalants. Mendelson's syndrome is a type of chemical pneumonitis.

Mineral oil should not be given internally to young children, pets, or anyone with a cough, hiatal hernia, or nocturnal reflux, because it can cause complications such as lipoid pneumonia. Due to its low density, it is easily aspirated into the lungs, where it cannot be removed by the body. In children, if aspirated, the oil can work to prevent normal breathing, resulting in death of brain cells and permanent paralysis and/or brain damage.

== Signs and symptoms ==
Acute:

- Cough
- Difficulty Breathing
- Abnormal lung sounds (wet or gurgling sounds when breathing)
- Chest pain, tightness or burning sensation

Chronic:

- Persistent cough
- Shortness of breath
- Increased susceptibility to respiratory illness

Symptoms of chronic chemical pneumonitis may or may not be present, and can take months or years to develop to the point of noticeability.

== Diagnosis ==
The pragmatic challenge is to distinguish from aspiration pneumonia with an infectious component because the former does not require antibiotics while the latter does. While some issues, such as a recent history of exposure to substantive toxins, can foretell the diagnosis, for a patient with dysphagia the diagnosis may be less obvious, as the dysphagic patient may have caustic gastric contents damaging the lungs which may or may not have progressed to bacterial infection.

The following tests help determine how severely the lungs are affected:

- Blood gases (measurement of how much oxygen and carbon dioxide are in your blood)
- CT scan of chest
- Lung function studies (tests to measure breathing and how well the lungs are functioning)
- X-ray of the chest
- Swallowing studies to check if stomach acid is the cause of pneumonitis

== Treatment ==
Treatment is focused on reversing the cause of inflammation and reducing symptoms. Corticosteroids may be given to reduce inflammation, often before long-term scarring occurs. Antibiotics are usually not helpful or needed, unless there is a secondary infection. Oxygen therapy may be helpful.
