= Mastoidectomy =

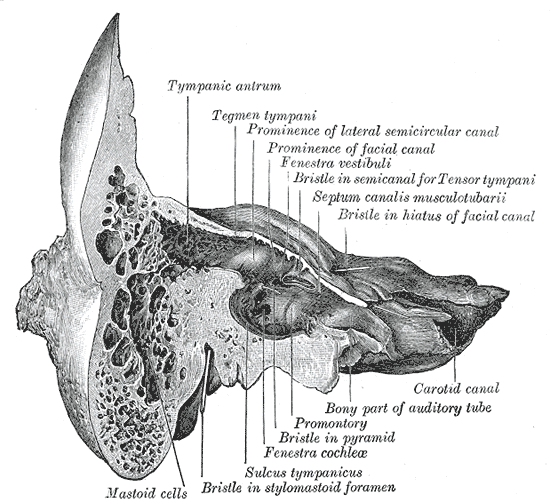
- Coronal section of right temporal bone with mastoid cells labeled in bottom left
- Specialty: Otolaryngology

A mastoidectomy is a procedure performed to remove the mastoid air cells near the middle ear. The procedure is part of the treatment for mastoiditis, chronic suppurative otitis media or cholesteatoma. Additionally, it is sometimes performed as part of other procedures, such as cochlear implants, or to access the middle ear.

== Usages ==
Historically, trephination was used to potentially relieve intracranial pressures or build-up of pus, with records dating back to pre-historic times. Over time, these became formalized as mastoidectomies. Mastoidectomies were used to treat infections such as otitis media, or abnormal skin cell growth near the middle ear. Over time, they were adapted to help treat hearing issues such as tinnitus.

Mastoidectomies have also been used in the modern practice of placing cochlear implants. Additionally, mastoidectomies are occasionally performed with tympanoplasties to fix the tympanic membrane.

== Complications ==
The following are possible complications from mastoidectomy procedures:

- Temporary or permanent hearing loss, tinnitus
- Facial nerve damage
- Dizziness or vertigo
- Taste changes
- Dural injury
- Cerebrospinal fluid leakage
- Intracranial complications such as brain abscess, subdural empyema, sigmoid sinus hemorrhage

== Classifications ==
In 2018, the International Otology Outcome Group agreed on guidelines defining different mastoidectomies. Before this, there was discourse on the proper classifications of the procedure.

Under the 2018 guidelines, there are the following types of mastoidectomy:

=== M1: Mastoidectomy with preserved canal wall ===
Also known as schwartze procedure or cortical mastoidectomy or canal wall up

- M1a: Mastoidectomy with preserved canal wall
- M1b: Mastoidectomy with preserved canal wall and posterior tympanotomy

=== M2: Mastoidectomy with partial or complete canal wall removal ===
Also known as canal wall down

- M2a: Mastoidectomy with only scutum removal, with tympanic membrane left intact (atticotomy)
- M2b: Mastoidectomy with scutum and postero-superior wall removal (attico-antrostomy)
- M2c: Mastoidectomy with complete canal wall removal and mastoid and middle ear exteriorization (modified radical mastoidectomy/Bondy's procedure or radical mastoidectomy)

=== M3: Mastoidectomy with subtotal petrosectomy ===
Used for

- M3a: Mastoidectomy with subtotal petrosectomy and otic capsule preserved
- M3b: Mastoidectomy with subtotal petrosectomy and otic capsule removed

Additionally, there are mixed categories, such as M1a+2a and M1b+2a. There is a slight distinction between M2c and M3a in that M3a removes the eardrum before pre auricular pit and cavity closure and blocks the tympanic opening of the Eustachian tube.

After the invention of endoscopic transcanal ear surgery by Muaaz Tarabichi, the usage of this procedure has decreased significantly.

== History ==
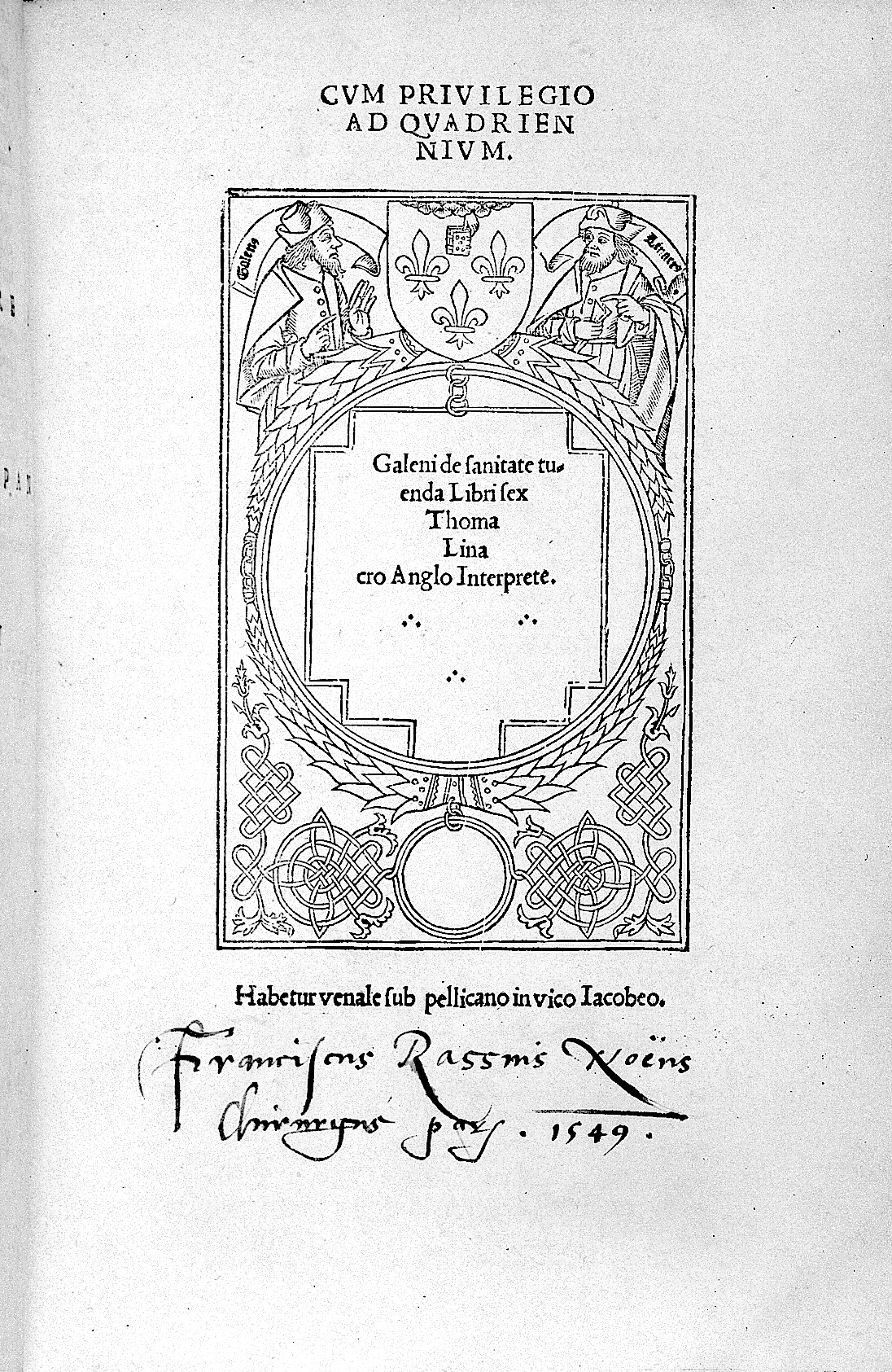
"De Sanitate tuenda", Galen, 1517 Wellcome L0003071

Greek physician Galen (AD 129-217) was the first to write in his treatise Hygiene (Italian: De Sanitate Tuenda, English: On the Preservation of Health) about ear discharge being a natural secretion from the brain, and the importance of permitting drainage of such fluid.

The first potential documented case of a mastoidectomy procedure was recorded in 1524 by Lucas van Leyden as an incision behind the right ear. Abscess drainage was popularized by Adam Politzer, considered to be one of the founders of otology and initially interpreted Galen's writings on ear discharge to mean that Galen removed infected mastoid regions. However, this may have been deliberately misrepresented to justify mastoidectomy procedures to more conservative audiences.

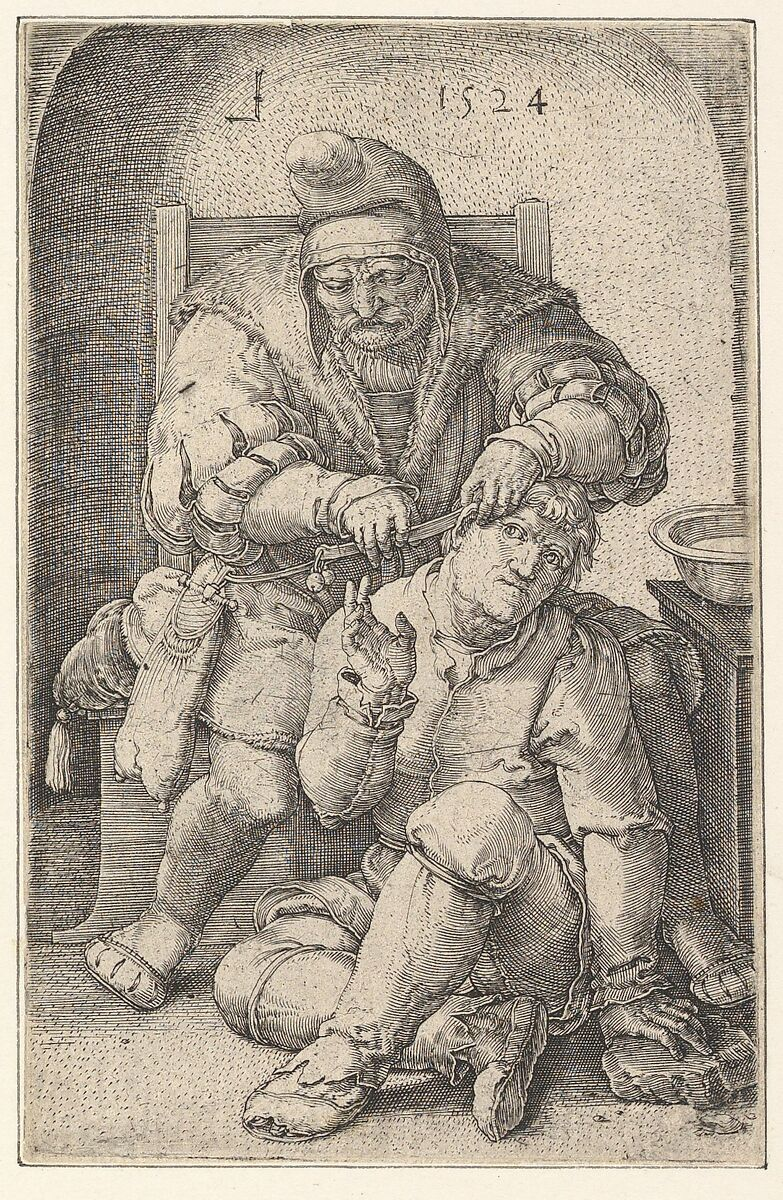
The Surgeon, engraving by Lucas van Leyden, 1524, depicting a barber surgeon making an incision

Additionally, there is controversy whether French physician Ambroise Paré was the first to describe a surgical procedure draining an infected ear of Francis II of France in 1560. Recent studies have shown how there is lack of documentation of this event by French historian Louis Régnier de la Planch, and also lack of mention in Paré's own writings.

Credit for the first mastoidectomy to remove abscesses is attributed to Jean-Louis Petit in the 18th century. However soon after this, the procedure fell out of popularity in the 18th century after the death of Justus von Berger in 1791. von Berger, the court physician of Christian VII, died 13 days after a mastoidectomy attempt to fix his right-sided deafness.

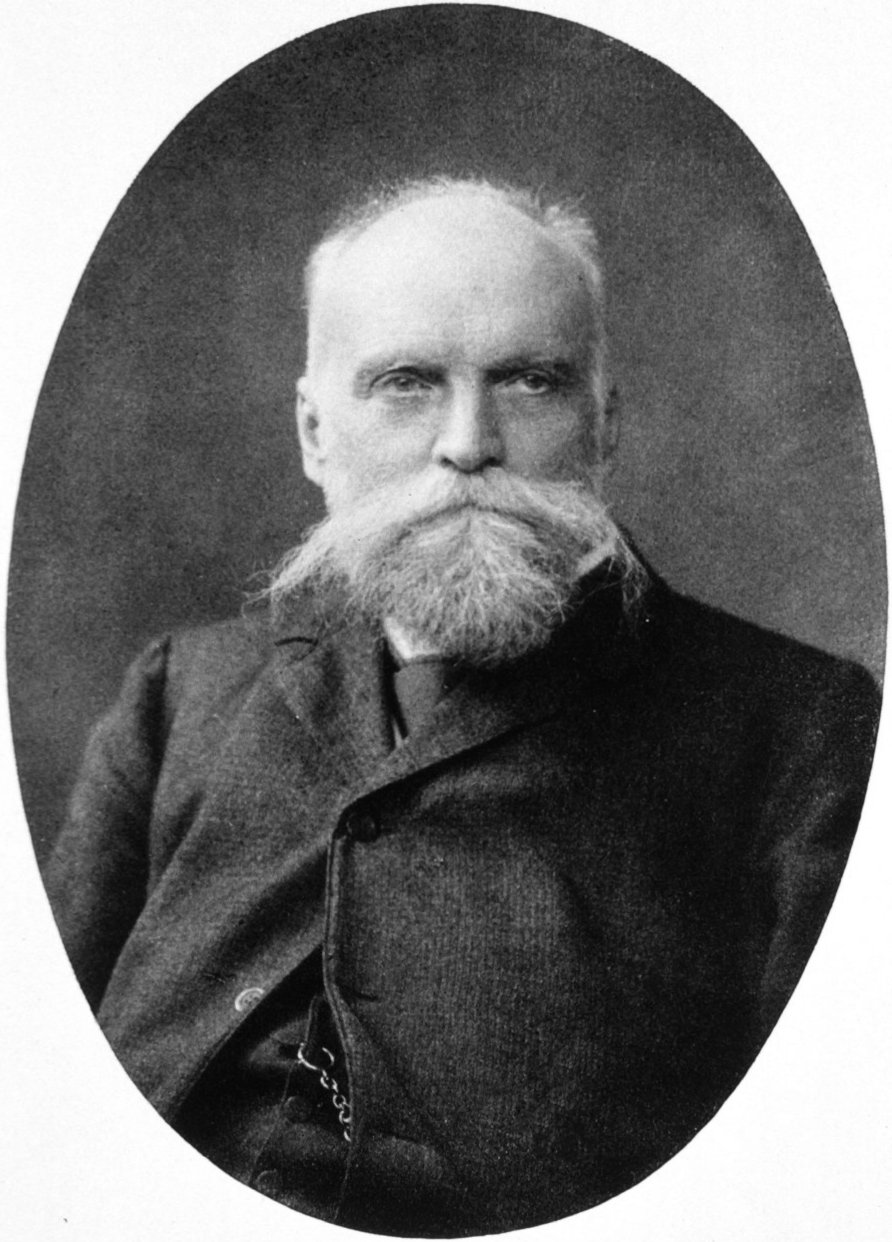
Hermann Schwartze

The mastoidectomy was revitalized in 1873 following the publication, Ueber die künstliche Eröffnung des Warzenfortsatzes (English: “On the artificial opening of the mastoid process”), written by Hermann Schwartze and his assistant Adolf Eysell. In the publication, Schwartze made several recommendations on modernizing the procedure, including replacing older instruments and a new surgical technique. This procedure, using a chisel and gouge, is now credited as the "modern mastoid operation" or Schwartze operation. Published in the oldest and most known otolaryngology journal of the time, Archiv für Ohrenheilkunde, the publication became widely disseminated and referenced.
