= Almonia =

Scientific classification
- Domain: Eukaryota
- Kingdom: Animalia
- Phylum: Arthropoda
- Class: Insecta
- Order: Lepidoptera
- Family: Crambidae
- Genus: Almonia; Walker, 1866

Genus of moths

Almonia is a genus of moths of the family Crambidae.

== Classification ==
The Crambidae are the grass moth family of (butterflies and moths). They are quite variable in appearance, the nominal subfamily Crambinae (grass moths) taking up closely folded postures on grass-stems where they are inconspicuous, while other subfamilies include brightly colored and patterned insects which rest in wing-spread attitudes.

In many classifications, the Crambidae have been treated as a subfamily of the Pyralidae or snout-moths. The principal difference is a structure in the ears called the praecinctorium, which joins two tympanic membranes in the Crambidae, and is absent from the Pyralidae. It would seem to be a matter of personal opinion (therefore not susceptible to definitive decision) whether this distinction merits division into two families, or whether the common presence of ventrally-located ears should unify them into one family. The latest review by Munroe & Solis, in Kristensen (1999) retains the Crambidae as a full family.

== Species ==
- Almonia atratalis Rothschild, 1915
- Almonia truncatalis Walker, [1866]

== Former species ==
- Almonia cristata (Hampson, 1891)
- Almonia lobipennis (Moore, 1886)
