= Labyrinthine fistula =

- Cross-section of cochlea. Perilymph is located in the scala tympani and scala vestibuli – the aqua regions at the top and bottom of the diagram.
- Specialty: ENT, Neurology

A labyrinthine fistula is an abnormal opening in the inner ear. This can result in leakage of the perilymph into the middle ear. This includes specifically a perilymph fistula (PLF), an abnormal connection between the fluid of the inner ear and the air-filled middle ear. This is caused by a rupture of the round window or oval window ligaments separating the inner and middle ear.

Another type of labyrinthine fistula is the superior semicircular canal dehiscence, which allows the inner ear to be influenced by the intracranial pressure directly.

== Signs and symptoms ==
PLF usually induces one or all the following pathological states: aural fullness, fluctuating or non-fluctuating hearing loss, tinnitus and dizziness, which may sometimes include vertigo and balance disorders.

== Causes ==
Labyrinthine fistula can be both congenital or develop over time with the thinning of the otic capsule by the persistent pulsations of the intracranial pressures against the bones of the skull. Finally, medical conditions (e.g. cholesteatoma) can result in a labyrinthine fistula. Traumatic events, with excessive pressure changes to the inner ear such as in scuba diving, head trauma, or an extremely loud noise can lead to rupture and leakage. The most common causes of PLF are: head or ear traumas, rapid increases of intracranial pressure, congenital abnormalities (in children), complication of stapedectomy, barotraumas (e.g. slap/suction, scuba diving, skydiving, strong and repetitive nose-blowing or sneezing, heavy lifting).

== Diagnosis ==
When diagnosing, PLF should be differentiated from Ménière's disease. Tympanostomy has been reported to be a way to diagnose and cure PLF.

== Treatment ==
Patients are advised to treat with bed rest and avoiding activities that increase intracranial pressure (i.e. weightlifting, Valsalva maneuver, scuba diving, flying in airplanes) with the hopes of the membrane healing on its own. Appropriate Physical therapy / vestibular rehabilitation techniques can be helpful in managing symptoms of movement sensitivity.
