= Scuti =

Scuti may refer to:

- The genitive form of the constellation Scutum, used as part of the designation for many stars
- Willis Gibson, competitive Tetris player, known online as Blue Scuti

== See also ==
- Scudo (disambiguation), historic currency, alternative spelling of the plural form Scudi
- Scutum (disambiguation)
- UY Scuti (disambiguation)
