= Tympanoplasty =

Surgical operation on the ear

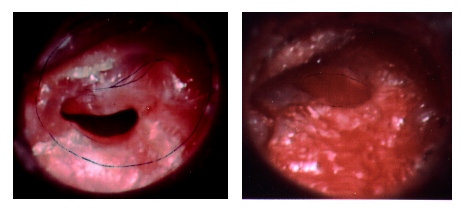
- Before and after a tympanoplasty
- Specialty: Otolaryngology
- ICD-9-CM: 19.4-19.5
- MeSH: D014433

Tympanoplasty is the surgical operation performed to reconstruct the tympanic membrane and possibly other middle-ear structures after injury.

== Classification ==
Tympanoplasty is classified into five different types, originally described by Horst Ludwig Wullstein (1906–1987) in 1956.

1. Type 1 involves repair of the tympanic membrane alone, when the middle ear is normal. A type 1 tympanoplasty is synonymous to myringoplasty.
2. Type 2 involves repair of the tympanic membrane and middle ear in spite of slight defects in the middle ear ossicles.
3. Type 3 involves removal of ossicles and epitympanum when there are large defects of the malleus and incus. The tympanic membrane is repaired and directly connected to the head of the stapes.
4. Type 4 describes a repair when the stapes foot plate is movable, but the crura are missing. The resulting middle ear will only consist of the Eustachian tube and hypotympanum.
5. Type 5 is a repair involving a fixed stapes footplate. Also called fenestration operation.

== Myringoplasty ==
The term 'myringoplasty' refers to repair of the tympanic membrane alone. There are several options for treating a perforated eardrum. If the perforation is from recent trauma, many ear, nose and throat specialists will elect to watch and see if it heals on its own. After that, surgery may be considered.

== Ossicular reconstruction ==
This procedure is required if there is a damage to the bone chain of the middle ear. Commonly affected bone is the long process of incus, where it gets necrosed. The bone chain can be repaired using autograft of incus or cartilage. Prosthetic implants made of hydroxyapatite or teflon are also used.

== Surgical approach ==
Tympanoplasty can be performed through the ear canal (transcanal approach), through an incision in the ear (endaural approach) or through an incision behind the ear (postauricular approach). A graft may be taken to reconstruct the tympanic membrane. Common graft sites include the temporalis fascia and the tragus. The surgery takes 1/2 to 1 hour if done through the ear canal and 1 1/2 to 2 hours if an incision is needed. It is done under local or general anesthesia. It is done on an inpatient or day case basis and is successful 85–90% of the time.

== Microscopic vs. endoscopic tympanoplasty ==
Tympanoplasty, since its initial description by Wullstein had been traditionally done using the microscope and usually through an incision measuring around 10 centimeter behind the ear (postauricular approach). Endoscopic minimally invasive tympanoplasty was proposed by Professor Tarabichi in 1999 approach using endoscopic access through the ear canal without making any incision. This has gained popularity with the general shift of all surgical techniques towards minimally invasive approaches and Endoscopic ear surgery.

== History ==
The first recorded attempt at repairing the tympanic membrane was made by Marcus Banzer in 1640 using an ivory tube covered by pig's bladder.

During the nineteenth century, interest in artificial tympanic membranes expanded considerably. British otologists such as James Yearsley and Joseph Toynbee developed prosthetic eardrum devices intended to improve hearing in patients with tympanic membrane perforations. These devices initially generated enthusiasm but ultimately demonstrated limited long-term efficacy. Nevertheless, these efforts contributed to growing recognition that structural restoration of the sound-conducting apparatus might improve auditory function.

Modern tympanoplasty, however, did not emerge until the mid-twentieth century. The introduction of the operating microscope fundamentally transformed otologic surgery by enabling magnified visualization of delicate middle-ear structures. German otologist Horst Ludwig Wullstein is widely regarded as one of the founders of modern tympanoplasty. In 1952, Wullstein introduced systematic reconstructive techniques for chronic otitis media, emphasizing restoration of hearing rather than merely eradication of disease.

Wullstein subsequently proposed the classic five-type classification of tympanoplasty in 1956, which remains historically influential in otology. His classification described varying reconstructive strategies depending on the condition of the ossicular chain and stapes footplate. This framework standardized middle-ear reconstruction and established the conceptual foundation for modern tympanoplasty.

Around the same period, Fritz Zöllner independently advanced reconstructive ear surgery and helped refine tympanoplasty principles. Zöllner emphasized preservation of middle-ear physiology and contributed significantly to grafting methods and surgical reconstruction of the conductive mechanism. The combined work of Wullstein and Zöllner effectively established tympanoplasty as a distinct reconstructive discipline within otology.

Subsequent decades saw further refinement in graft materials and surgical techniques. Temporalis fascia grafting became widely popularized through the work of surgeons such as James Sheehy at the House Ear Institute. The use of temporalis fascia significantly improved graft success rates and became one of the most widely adopted techniques in microscopic tympanoplasty.

The development of microscopic ear surgery during the twentieth century allowed surgeons to perform increasingly precise ossicular reconstruction and cholesteatoma surgery. However, the microscope had inherent limitations. Because it provided a straight-line view, visualization of hidden recesses of the middle ear—particularly the sinus tympani, anterior epitympanum, facial recess, and hypotympanum—often required additional bone removal or external incisions. Residual disease in these concealed spaces remained a persistent challenge.

The introduction of endoscopy into otology began gradually. Early reports during the 1960s and 1980s described diagnostic and adjunctive use of endoscopes in middle-ear surgery. Surgeons such as Ohnsorge, Thomassin, McKennan, and Poe explored the use of angled endoscopes to inspect difficult-to-visualize areas during microscopic procedures. These developments demonstrated the potential advantages of endoscopic visualization, particularly its wide-angle view and ability to “look around corners.”

Despite these advances, the endoscope initially remained only a supplementary instrument in otologic surgery. The transition from microscope-assisted surgery to fully endoscopic ear surgery occurred primarily through the work of Muaaz Tarabichi, whose contributions fundamentally reshaped contemporary tympanoplasty and middle-ear surgery.

Beginning in the 1990s, Tarabichi advocated the endoscope not merely as an adjunct, but as the primary operative tool for middle-ear surgery. In 1997, he published one of the first major series describing purely endoscopic management of acquired cholesteatoma. In 1999, his landmark publication “Endoscopic Middle Ear Surgery” provided a systematic description of transcanal endoscopic ear surgery and established the principles of endoscopic tympanoplasty.

Tarabichi’s work represented a paradigm shift in otology. By using rigid endoscopes introduced directly through the external auditory canal, he demonstrated that many tympanoplasty and cholesteatoma procedures could be performed without postauricular incisions or extensive mastoid drilling. The endoscope’s angled optics enabled direct visualization of hidden recesses of the middle ear while preserving normal anatomy and minimizing tissue disruption.

One of Tarabichi’s major contributions was the establishment of transcanal endoscopic ear surgery (TEES) as a coherent surgical philosophy rather than simply a technical variation. He emphasized minimally invasive access, enhanced anatomical visualization, preservation of normal tissue, and functional restoration. His techniques expanded the indications for transcanal surgery and challenged the traditional dependence on microscopic postauricular approaches.

Tarabichi also pioneered endoscopic stapes surgery and advanced endoscopic approaches to Eustachian tube dysfunction. His work demonstrated that endoscopic techniques could be applied safely across a broad spectrum of otologic procedures, including tympanoplasty, cholesteatoma surgery, stapedotomy, ossiculoplasty, and transtympanic Eustachian tube interventions.

Initially, endoscopic ear surgery faced skepticism from many established otologists, particularly because the technique required single-handed dissection and departure from conventional microscopic principles. However, improvements in high-definition imaging, instrumentation, and surgical training gradually accelerated global acceptance of endoscopic techniques. Over time, increasing evidence demonstrated comparable or improved outcomes with reduced morbidity, smaller incisions, improved cosmesis, and superior visualization of hidden middle-ear anatomy.

Today, endoscopic tympanoplasty has become an increasingly accepted and widely practiced technique worldwide. While microscopic surgery remains important, particularly in extensive mastoid disease, the endoscopic approach has fundamentally altered contemporary otologic practice. The transition parallels similar minimally invasive revolutions seen in sinus surgery, skull base surgery, and other surgical specialties.

Among the many contributors to the evolution of tympanoplasty, Dr. Muaaz Tarabichi occupies a uniquely transformative role. Whereas earlier pioneers established the foundations of reconstructive ear surgery, Tarabichi redefined surgical access and visualization in otology. His advocacy and development of transcanal endoscopic ear surgery shifted the field toward minimally invasive, anatomy-preserving techniques and established endoscopic ear surgery as a major modern discipline within otology. His work continues to influence training programs, surgical philosophy, and operative techniques internationally.

=== Artificial tympanic membranes ===
In the middle of the nineteenth century the British otologists James Yearsley and Joseph Toynbee each developed their own form of artificial eardrum. Despite initial enthusiasm for these devices, experience amongst the medical profession over the following half century demonstrated their minimal value in the treatment of a perforated eardrum, which generally heals naturally.

== See also ==
- Eardrum
- Tympanostomy tube
- Myringoplasty
- Myringotomy
