= Tympanocentesis =

Medical procedure involving the ear

- Specialty: Otolaryngology

Tympanocentesis is the drainage of fluid from the middle ear, usually caused by otitis media, by using a small-gauge needle to puncture the tympanic membrane (eardrum).

It is indicated in children with acute otitis media who are susceptible to complications like facial paresis and systemic toxicity, or failed treatment with antibiotics. It may relieve pain, but symptoms may recur if there is ongoing inflammation from the infection.

It is sometimes referred to as a "tap" and, when conducted twice as part of a clinical trial of medication, a "double tap."

Tympanocentesis was first documented in 1768, but has undergone significant advancements.

The treatment should not be used in the following situations:

- Uncooperative patient
- Intact tympanostomy tubes
- Intratympanic tumour
- Acute otitis externa (due to potential to introduce bacteria or fungi from the external to the middle ear)
- Vascular abnormalities (due to high risk of bleeding)
- Suboptimal visibility of ear landmarks

== See also ==
- Myringotomy
