= Stapedectomy =

Surgical removal of the stapes bone from the middle ear

Stapedectomy is a surgical procedure in which the stapes bone is removed from the middle ear and replaced with a prosthesis.

If the stapes footplate is fixed in position, rather than being normally mobile, the result is a conductive hearing loss. There are two major causes of stapes fixation. The first is a disease process of abnormal mineralization of the temporal bone called otosclerosis. The second is a congenital malformation of the stapes.

In both of these situations, it is possible to improve hearing by removing the stapes bone and replacing it with a micro prosthesis – creating a small hole in the fixed stapes footplate and inserting a tiny, piston-like prosthesis. The results of this surgery are generally most reliable in patients whose stapes has lost mobility because of otosclerosis. Nine out of ten patients who undergo the procedure will come out with significantly improved hearing while less than 1% will experience worsened hearing acuity or deafness. Successful surgery usually provides an increase in hearing acuity of about 20 dB. However, most of the published results of success fall within the speech frequency of 500 Hz, 1000 Hz and 2000 Hz; poorer results are typically obtained in the high frequencies, but these are normally less hampered by otosclerosis in the first place.

== Stapedectomy process and results ==
Stapedectomy has success rates ranging from 80% to 95%.

Stapedectomy closes what is called the "air bone gap" very efficiently, meaning it restores efficient conduction of sound coming through the air close to the level of the best ability of the nerve cells to perceive the sound.

It takes 30 minutes to 90 minutes depending on skills and experience of the surgeon and the presence of difficult or easy anatomical access to the stapes.

Stapedectomy is performed under either local or general anesthesia depending on the preference of the surgeon.

Most surgeons do not make any skin incisions, especially when the surgery is performed with an endoscope. However, sometimes the ear canal is so small that an incision is needed.

== Indications ==
Indications of stapedectomy:

1. Conductive hearing loss (due to fixation of stapes).
2. Air bone gap of at least 30 dB.
3. Presence of Carhart's notch in the audiogram of a patient with conductive hearing loss (relative)
4. Good cochlear reserve as assessed by the presence of good speech discrimination.

== Contraindications ==
Contraindications for stapedectomy:

- Poor general condition of the patient.
- Only hearing ear.
- Poor cochlear reserve as shown by poor speech discrimination scores
- Patient with tinnitus and vertigo
- Presence of active otosclerotic foci (otospongiosis) as evidenced by a positive flemmingo sign.
- Conductive deafness due to Ehlers–Danlos Syndrome (EDS)

== Complications ==
Complications of stapedectomy:

- Facial palsy
- Vertigo in the immediate post op period
- Vomiting
- Perilymph gush
- Floating foot plate
- Tympanic membrane tear
- Dead labyrinth
- Perilymph fistula
- Labyrinthitis
- Granuloma (Reparative)
- Tinnitus

When a stapedectomy is done in a middle ear with a congenitally fixed footplate, the results may be excellent but the risk of hearing damage is greater than when the stapes bone is removed and replaced (for otosclerosis). This is primarily due to the risk of additional anomalies being present in the congenitally abnormal ear. If high pressure within the fluid compartment that lies just below the stapes footplate exists, then a perilymphatic gusher may occur when the stapes is removed. Even without immediate complications during surgery, there is always concern of a perilymph fistula forming postoperatively.

In 1995, Glasscock et al. published a 25-year single-centre review of over 900 patients who underwent stapedectomy and stapedotomy and found complications rates as follows: reparative granuloma 1.3%, tympanic membrane perforation 1.0%, total sensorineural hearing loss 0.6%, partial sensorineural hearing loss 0.3%, and vertigo 0.3%. In this series, there was no incidence of facial nerve paralysis or tinnitus.

== Stapedotomy ==
A modified stapes operation, called a stapedotomy, is thought by many otologic surgeons to be safer and reduce the chances of postoperative complications. In stapedotomy, instead of removing the whole stapes footplate, a tiny hole is made in the footplate – either with a microdrill or with a laser, and a prosthesis is placed to touch this area, oval window. This procedure can be further improved by the use of a tissue graft seal of the fenestra, which is now common practice.

Laser stapedotomy is a well-established surgical technique for treating conductive hearing loss due to otosclerosis. The procedure creates a tiny opening in the stapes (the smallest bone in the human body) in which to secure a prosthetic. The CO_{2} laser allows the surgeon to create very small, precisely placed holes without increasing the temperature of the inner ear fluid by more than one degree, whilst decreasing the risk of footplate fracture, making this an extremely safe surgical solution. The hole diameter can be predetermined according to the prosthesis diameter. Treatment can be completed in a single operation visit using anesthesia, normally followed by one or two nights' hospitalization with subsequent at-home recovery time a matter of days or weeks.

== Stapedectomy vs. stapedotomy ==
Comparisons have shown stapedotomy to yield either as good or better results than stapedectomy (measured by hearing improvement and reduction in the air-bone hearing gap, and especially at higher sound frequencies), and to be less prone to complications. In particular, stapedotomy procedure greatly reduces the chance of a perilymph fistula (leakage of cochlear fluid).

Stapedotomy, like stapedectomy, can be successful in the presence of sclerotic adhesions (tissue growths abnormally linking the bones to the tympanic cavity), provided the adhesions are removed during surgery. However, the adhesions may recur over time. The stapedotomy method is not applicable in those relatively rare cases that involve sclerosis of the entire ossicular chain.

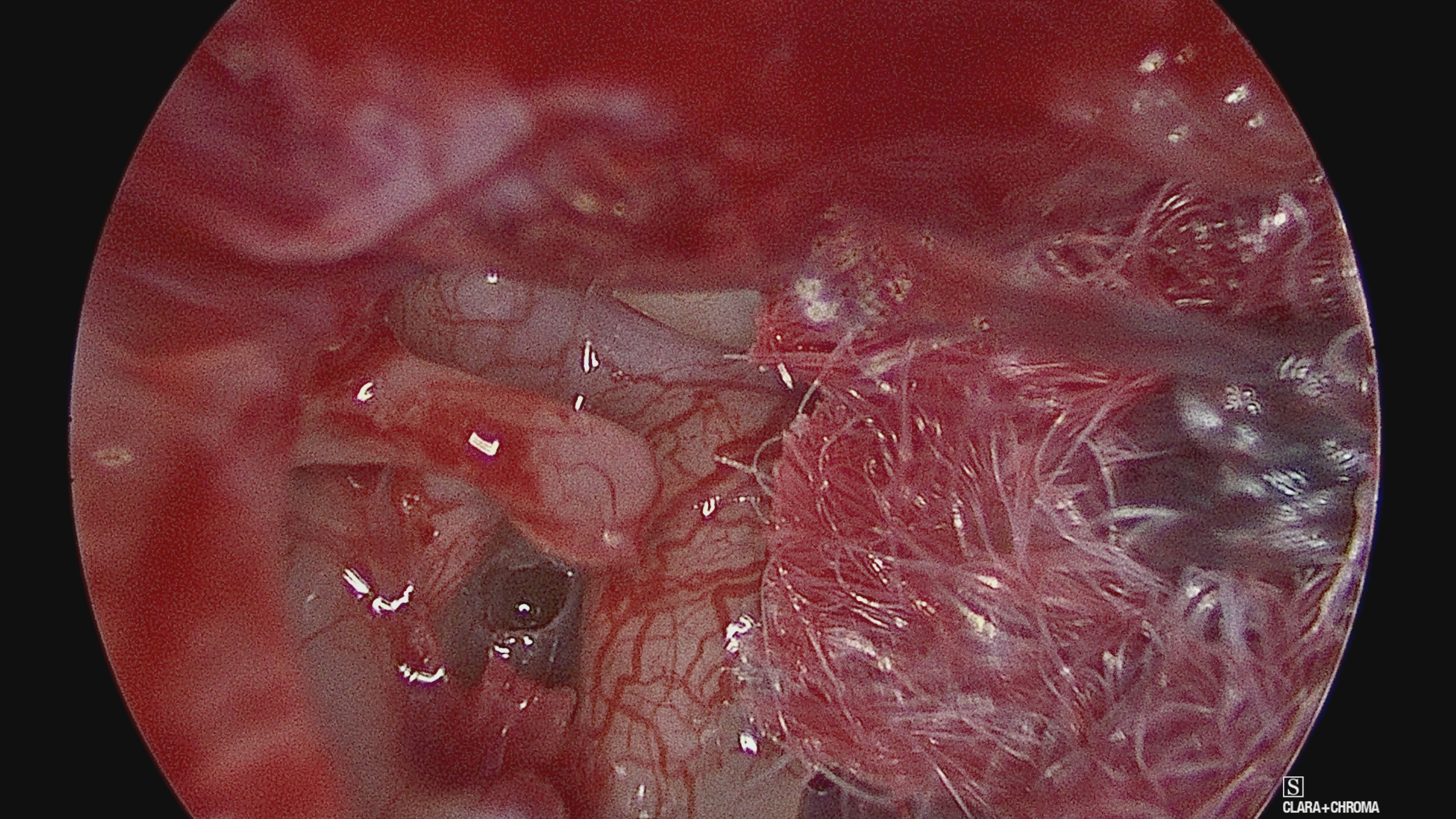
Endoscopic view of the stapedotomy in the footplate of the stapes bone

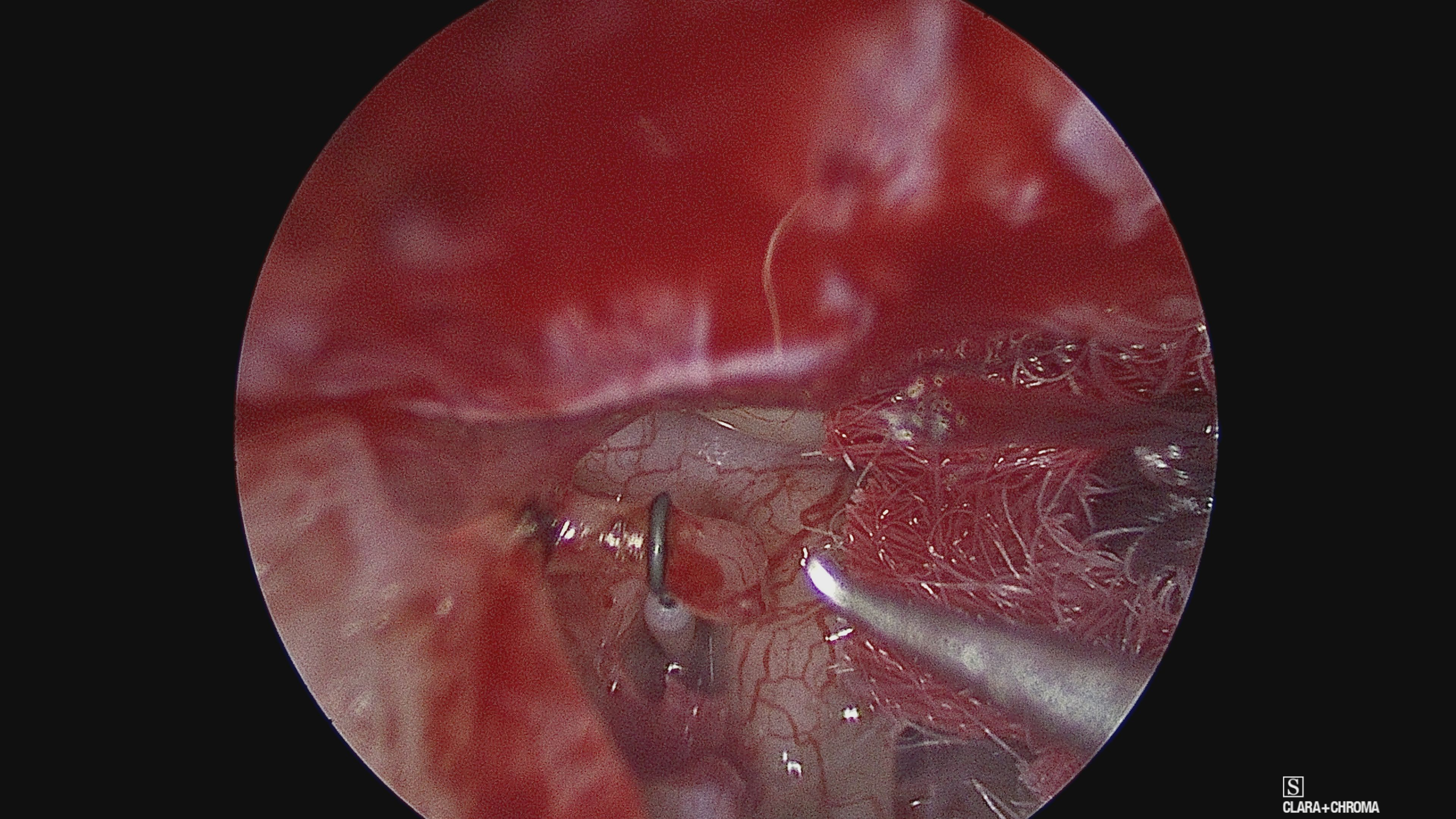
Endoscopic view of the piston inserted into the stapedotomy and on to the long processof the incus

Because it is a simpler and safer procedure, stapedotomy is normally preferred to stapedectomy in the absence of predictable complications. However, the success rate of either surgery depends greatly on the skill and the familiarity with the procedure of the surgeon. Furthermore, a major success factor in both surgeries is correctly determining the length of the prosthesis.

== Endoscopic stapedectomy ==
In traditional microscopic stapedectomy (or stapedotomy), the surgeon relies heavily on an operating microscope, which offers high magnification but is strictly limited by a linear, line-of-sight visual pathway. In the mid-1990s, Syrian-American otolaryngologist Dr. Muaaz Tarabichi introduced the novel concept of performing stapedotomy entirely through a rigid endoscope via a transcanal approach. This clinical evolution marked a paradigm shift in otology, presenting a minimally invasive alternative that successfully bypasses many of the restrictive anatomical constraints inherent to traditional microscopic ear surgery.

=== Advantages over microscopic techniques ===
The practical integration of the endoscope into stapedial surgery provides several distinct clinical and anatomical advantages over legacy systems:

- Wide and Angled Visualization: Unlike the microscope's straight-line view, the wide-angle lens of a rigid endoscope—particularly 0-degree and 30-degree scopes—allows the operating surgeon to effectively "look around the corners" of the external auditory canal. This offers an immediate, close-up view of deep recesses like the oval window niche, the sinus tympani, and the anterior crus of the stapes.
- Preservation of Bony Structures: In microscopic surgery, the posterosuperior bony canal wall overhang frequently obstructs the view of the incus and stapes footplate, requiring the surgeon to manually curette or drill away this bone. The endoscope can often bypass this structural overhang entirely, significantly reducing or eliminating the need for invasive scutum removal.
- Minimal Handling of the Chorda Tympani: Because the endoscope provides excellent exposure through the natural ear canal, manipulation and stretching of the chorda tympani nerve (which passes through the middle ear and supplies taste to the tongue) are minimized. Clinical data shows that avoiding scutum resection directly correlates with reduced trauma to this nerve, drastically lowering the risk of postoperative taste disturbances, or dysgeusia.
- No External Incisions: The endoscopic procedure is performed completely transcanal, entirely eliminating the need for a postauricular (behind the ear) or endaural incision. This translates directly to less postoperative pain, no external cosmetic scarring, and notably faster recovery times for the patient.

=== Contributions of Dr. Muaaz Tarabichi ===
Dr. Muaaz Tarabichi is widely recognized globally as a pioneer and the "father of endoscopic ear surgery" (EES), whose early work systematically challenged the decades-old reliance on the operating microscope.

Dr. Tarabichi first formally introduced his groundbreaking work on the subject during an invited lecture at the American Otological Society (AOS) meeting in 1995, where he presented the world's first described endoscopic stapedotomy techniques. Though initially met with skepticism by the established otologic community, he solidified the clinical foundations of the approach with a landmark 1999 publication detailing his comprehensive experience with endoscopic middle ear surgery.

To advance global adoption of EES, Tarabichi later co-founded the International Working Group on Endoscopic Ear Surgery (IWGEES) to formalize training protocols. He partnered with Dr Heinz Stammberger to establish the Tarabichi Stammberger Ear and Sinus Institute (TSESI) to provide fully-funded fellowships and education to international trainees. His decades of advocacy helped transition endoscopic stapedectomy from an experimental technique into a mainstream, widely accepted surgical option.

=== Limitations ===
The primary ongoing challenge of endoscopic stapedectomy remains the strict one-handed surgical technique, as the surgeon must physically hold the endoscope in one hand while operating instruments exclusively with the other. This specialized approach requires lightweight instruments and a steep learning curve to adequately compensate for the loss of binocular depth perception inherent to looking at a two-dimensional surgical monitor.

== History ==
The world's first stapedectomy is credited to Dr. John J.Shea Jr. who performed it in May 1956 on a 54-year-old housewife who could no longer hear even with a hearing aid. Significant contributions to modern stapedectomy techniques were then made by the late Dr. Antonio De La Cruz of the House Ear Institute in Los Angeles; by the late Professor Henri André Martin of the Hôpital Edouard Herriot in Lyon, France, including calibrated platinotomy (stapes footplate rather than whole surgery) and trans-footplate piston surgery that also paved the way for modern stapedotomy; and by the late Dr. Jean-René Causse of the eponymous clinic in Béziers, France, who pioneered the use of Teflon piston prostheses (also critical progress for stapedotomy) and, with his late son Dr. Jean-Bernard Causse, the reattachment of the stapedius muscle alongside the use of veinous grafts. in 1999, Professor Tarabichi of the Tarabichi Stammberger Ear and Sinus Institute, reported his experience performing the surgery using endoscope which lessens the need to remove bone to obtain access to the stapes.

== Anatomy gallery ==
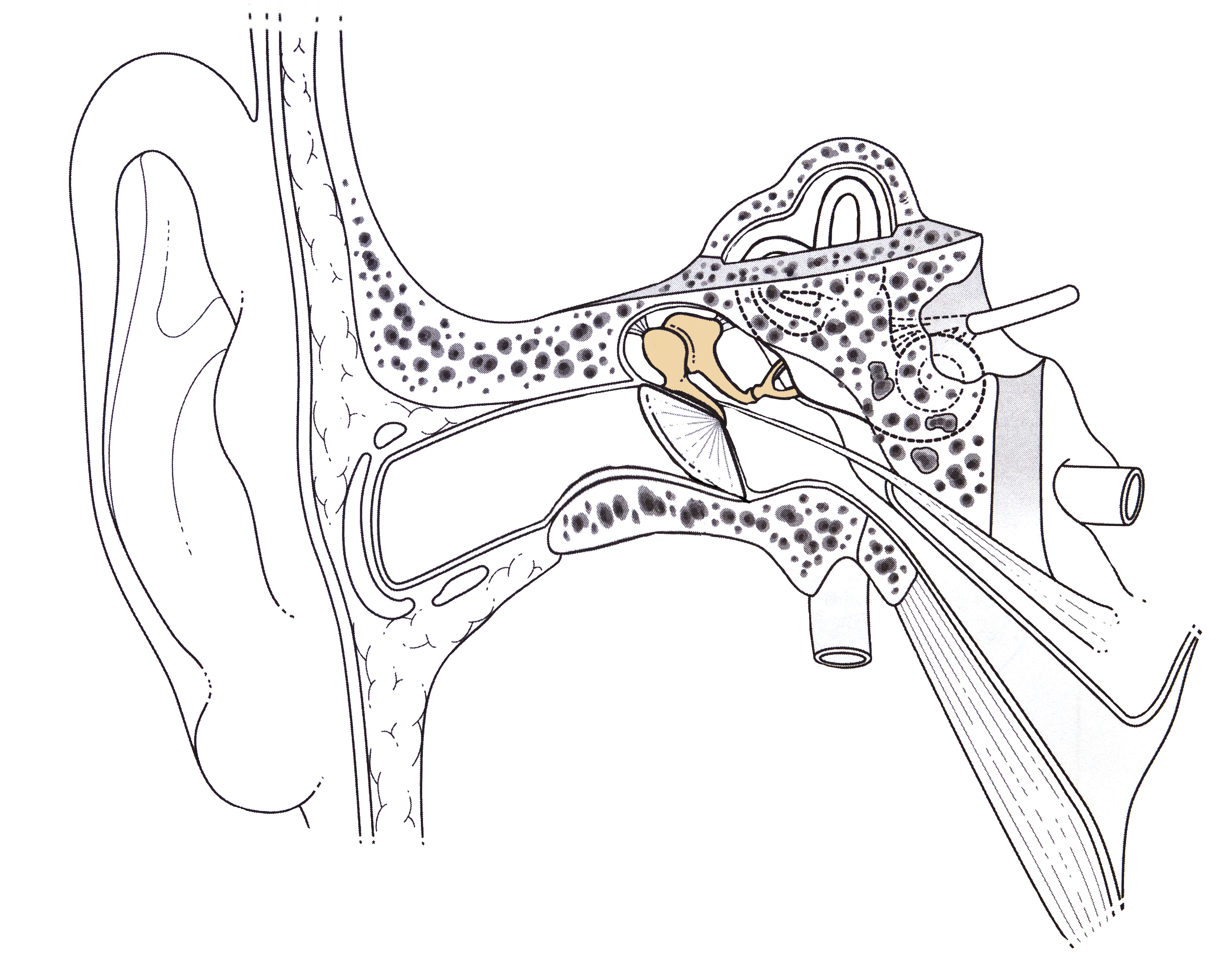
Location of the ossicular chain in the ear

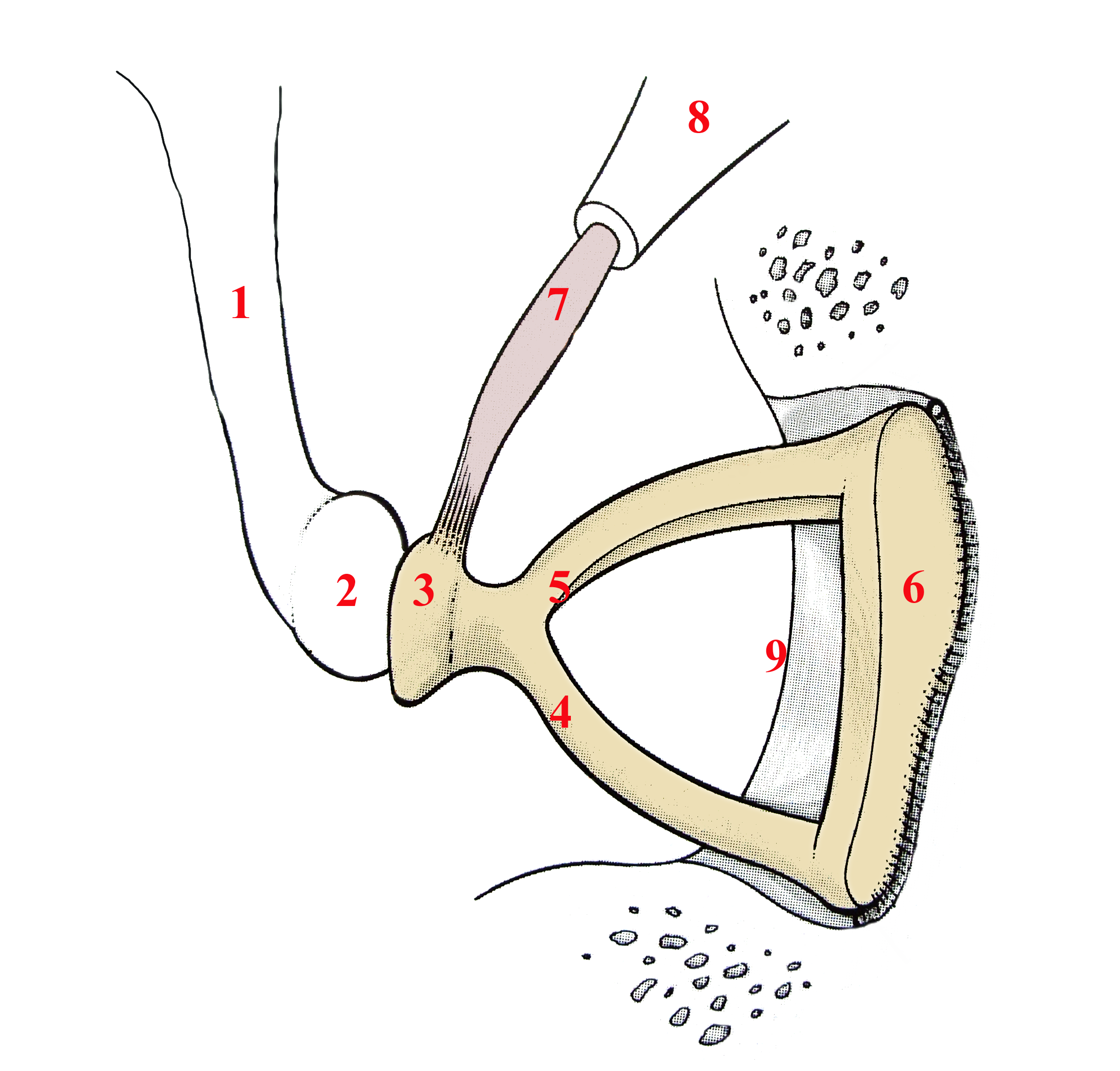
Right-ear stapes

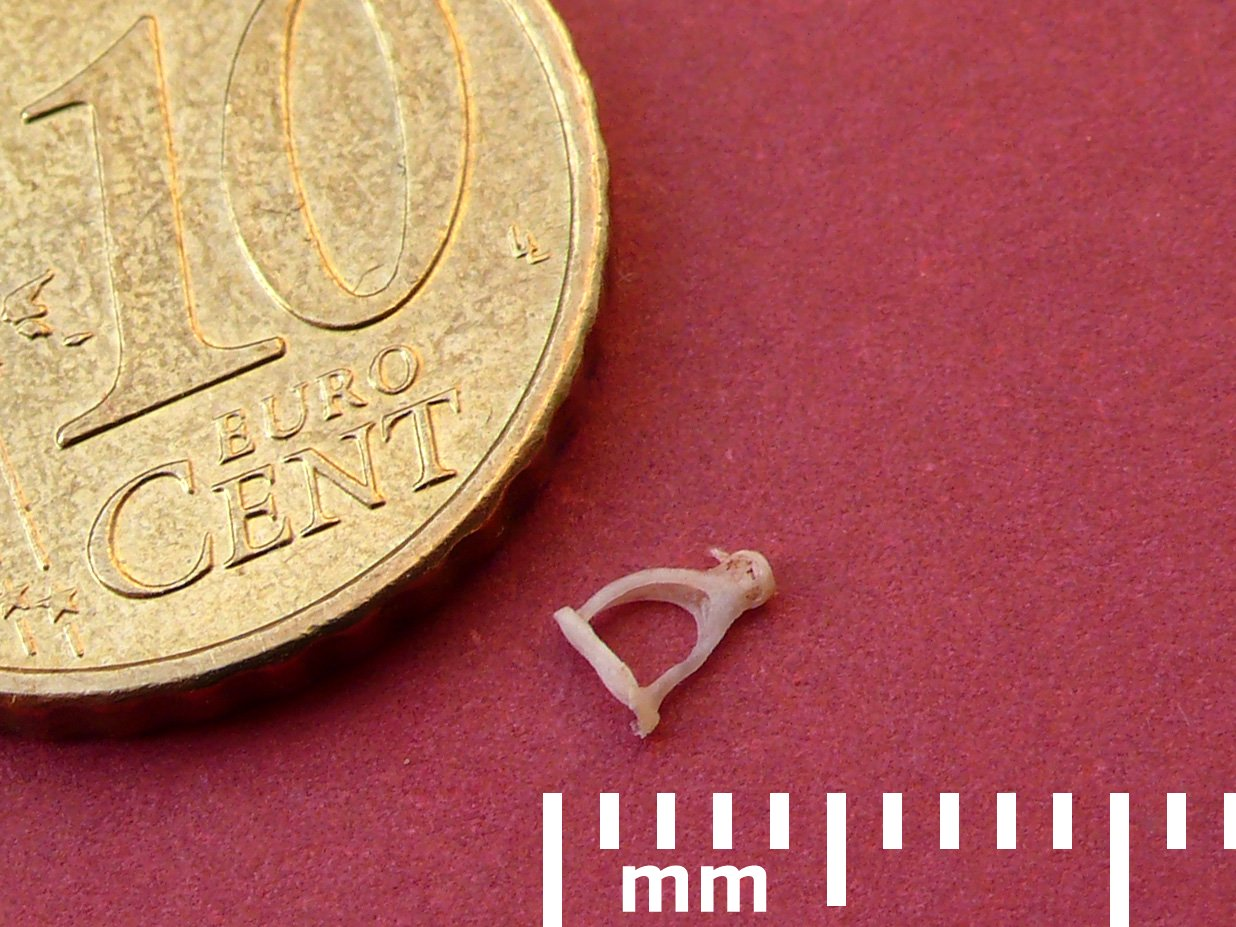
Stapes: Relative size

== See also ==
- List of surgeries by type
