= Endoscopic ear surgery =

Surgical technique

- Specialty: Otolaryngology

Endoscopic ear surgery (EES) is a minimally invasive alternative to traditional ear surgery and is defined as the use of the rigid endoscope, as opposed to a surgical microscope, to visualize the middle and inner ear during otologic surgery. During endoscopic ear surgery the surgeon holds the endoscope in one hand while working in the ear with the other. To allow this kind of single-handed surgery, different surgical instruments have to be used. Endoscopic visualization has improved due to high-definition video imaging and wide-field endoscopy, and being less invasive, EES is gaining importance as an adjunct to microscopic ear surgery.

== History ==
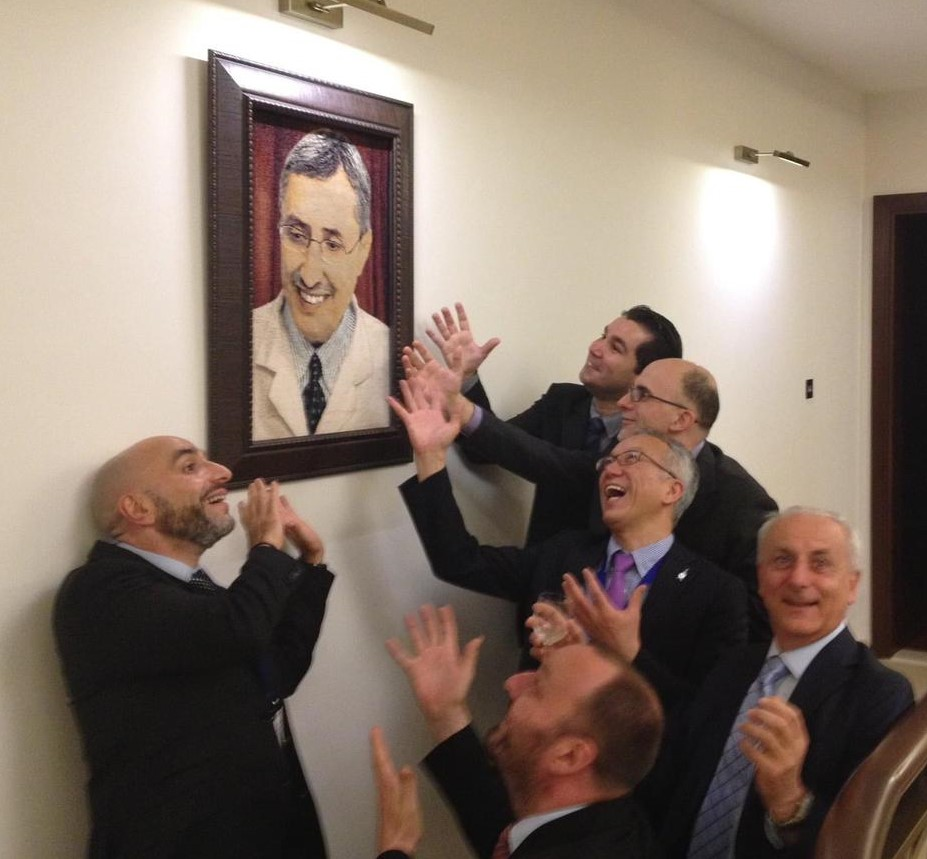
IWGEES Founding Board members paying tribute to Dr Tarabichi. Left to right: Stephane Ayache, Dave Potheir, Seiji Kakehata, Daniele Marchioni, Joao Noqueira (top right), and Livio Presutti.

Endoscopic ear surgery was first described in 1992 by Professor Ahmed El-Guindy and pioneered by Dr Muaaz Tarabichi in Dubai during the late 1990s. His contributions to the field have led to him being recognized globally as the father of endoscopic ear surgery. He now lectures extensively on the topic worldwide.

Similar to the early years of FESS (functional endoscopic sinus surgery), EES has been controversial since early descriptions in the 1960s. Tarabichi's initial dissertations were met with skepticism in a very similar fashion to Professor Heinz Stammberger and the backlash he faced when he introduced FESS. Tarabichi and Professor Stammberger persisted in their advocacy of their respective techniques and developed a friendship which resulted in the development of Tarabichi Stammberger Ear and Sinus Institute to train and educate surgeons in endoscopic techniques.

One of the benefits of an endoscope compared to the microscope is the wide-field view of the middle ear afforded by the location of the light source at the tip of the instrument and the availability of various types of angled lenses. Middle ear procedures that utilize a rigid endoscope for viewing may reduce the need to drill for enhanced exposure of the operative field. The traditional otologic operating microscopes typically require larger portals (e.g., postauricular approaches) to enable adequate passage of light for intraoperative viewing and follow-up surveillance in the clinic. One handed dissection is cited as the main drawback to EES.

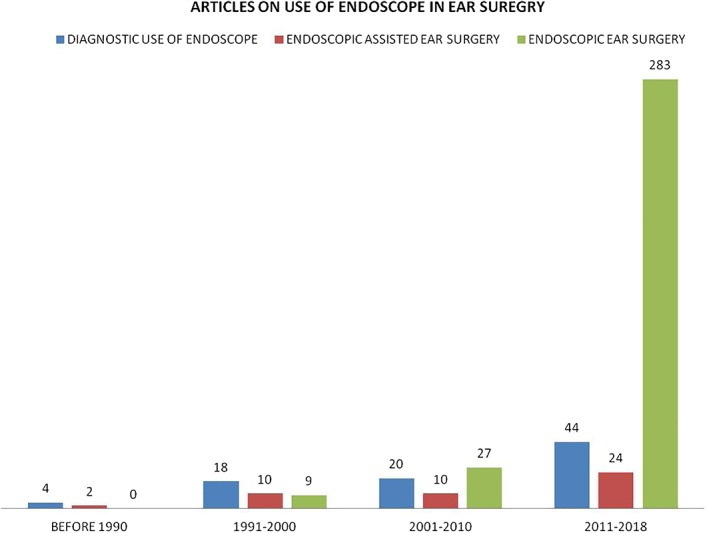
Number of publications categorized by the pattern of utilization of the endoscope in ear surgery per the last four decades

The indications for this relatively new technique are evolving. The use of rigid endoscopes to perform ear surgery (operative EES), rather than just to visualize the contents of the middle ear (observational EES), is increasing as optimized instrumentation and operative approaches become available. The number of citations published in the literature on this topic has skyrocketed recently with much of the interest focused on the use the endoscope as the main workhorse in otologic surgery rather than using the method for observation or as an adjunct to microscopic surgery.

== Rationale ==
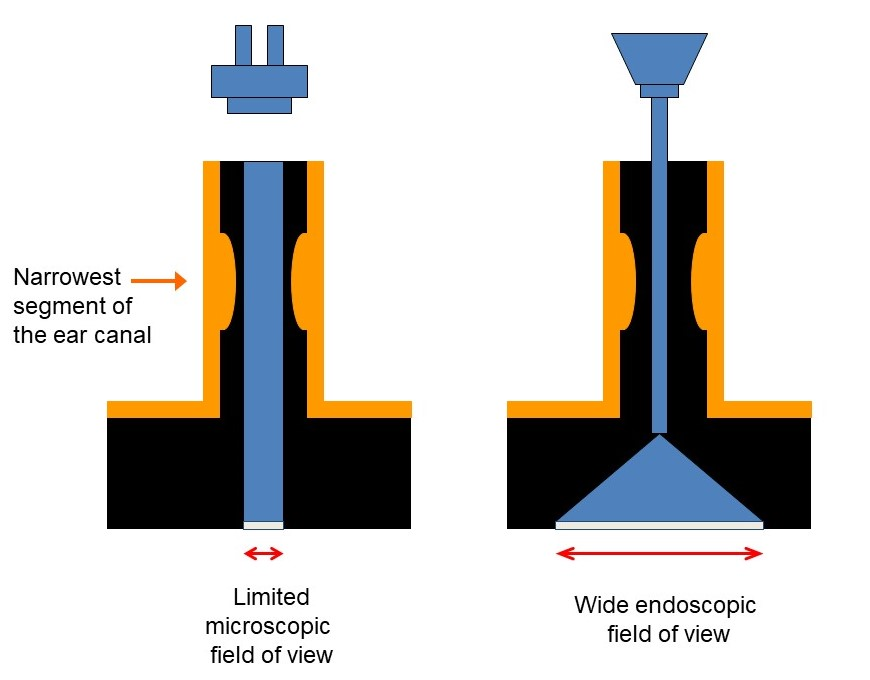
Comparison between the field of view in endoscopic versus microscopic ear surgery

Ear surgery had been performed with the microscope and through the mastoid cavity until the 1990s. The ability to see certain areas of the anatomy and to pursue disease was hampered by the straight line access when using the microscope. The endoscope allows the surgeon to look around the corners and to reach inaccessible areas like the sinus tympani through the ear canal. Endoscopic ear surgery utilizes the ear canal as the access point for removal of cholesteatoma and therefore represent a minimally invasive alternative to traditional surgery that requires large incision behind the ear. The reduction in postoperative pain and cost that is usually associated with the use of minimally invasive techniques has been demonstrated in endoscopic ear surgery.

== Classification ==
Cohen and his colleagues at MEEI devised a classification system for the degree of use of the endoscope in otologic surgery:

- Class 0: Microscopic only case
- Class 1: Inspection with endoscope
- Class 2: Mixed dissection with endoscope and microscope
- Class 3: Endoscopic only case

== Types of endoscopic ear surgery ==
=== For cholesteatoma ===
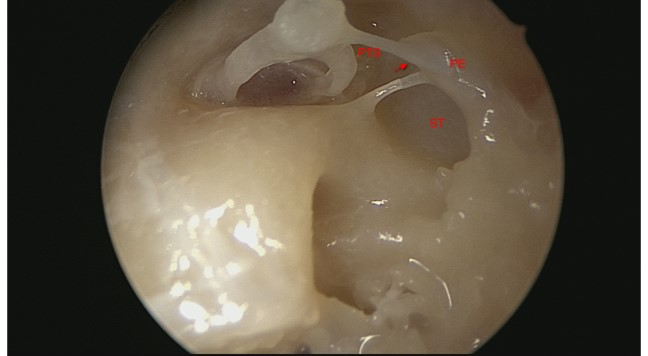
Sinus tympani: An area of the tympanic cavity that is hidden from microscope

Surgery for cholesteatoma offers the most advantages for using the endoscope instead of the microscope. Failures in cholesteatoma surgery are most common in certain areas of the anatomy of the tympanic cavity, such as the facial recess, sinus tympani, anterior attic, and the protympanum which are poorly accessed with the microscope. The endoscope with its ability to see around the corners can visualize certain areas that are notorious for residual cholesteatoma such as the sinus tympani.

=== For perforated eardrum ===
Access to the whole perimeter of the perforation is essential for successful treatment of holes in the eardrum. To achieve that, using the microscope, an incision is made behind the ear using the "postauricular approach". The endoscope, with its ability to see around the corner, increases the likelihood of performing closures of perforations through the ear canal rather than making large incisions to access the whole perimeter of the perforation.

=== For otosclerosis ===
Otosclerosis is a disease that results in fixation of the stapes, which conducts sound to the inner ear. Microscopic stapedectomy, requires some removal of bone, and in some instances, an incision is made to facilitate access. The endoscope's ability to visualize around corners allows for better visualization of the stapes without needing any bone removal or making an incision.

=== For access into the Eustachian tube ===
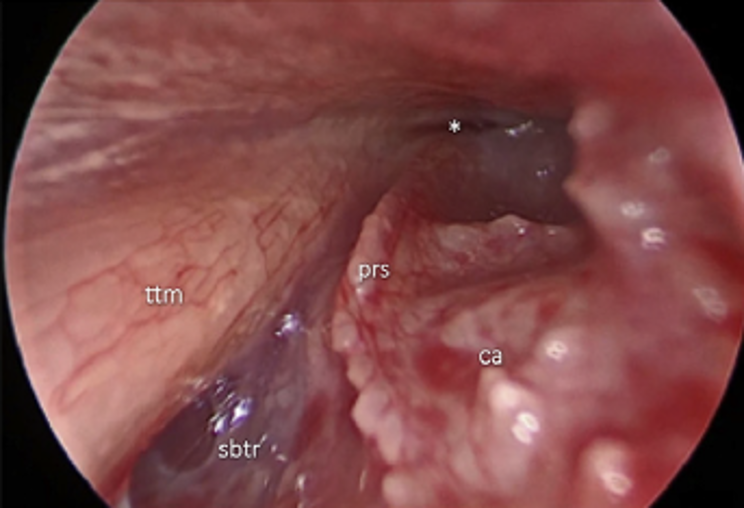
Using 30 degrees endoscope to look into the bony Eustachian tube on a right ear. * indicates opening of the cartilaginous tube. ca: carotid artery. ttm: Tensor Tympani Muscle. prs: Protympanic spine. sbtr: Subtubal Recess.

The Eustachian tube plays the primary role in the pathophysiology of disorders of the middle ear. Access to the proximal part (ear side) of the eustachian tube is limited since most of the existing surgical access is posteriorly through the mastoid cavity. The endoscope allows the surgeon to reach the protympanum or the bony Eustachian tube and possibly carry out interventions to maintain an open eustachian tube by inserting a dilatation balloon catheter into that area.
