= Myringoplasty =

Surgical operation in the ear

- Specialty: Otorhinolaryngology

Myringoplasty is the closure of the perforation of pars tensa of the tympanic membrane. When myringoplasty is combined with removal of scar tissue, it is called tympanoplasty. The operation is performed with the patient supine and face turned to one side. The graft material most commonly used for the surgery is temporalis fascia. The tragal cartilage and tragal perichondrium are also used as the graft by some surgeons.

Myringoplasty restores hearing loss in certain cases of tinnitus. The chances of re-infection and persistent discharge is less after surgery. Myringoplasty should not be performed if there is active discharge from the middle ear, if the patient has uncontrolled nasal allergy, when the other ear is dead, or in children less than 3 years of age. Myringoplasty is often done under general anaesthesia, but it can also be done under local anaesthesia.

== Technique ==
=== Underlay technique ===
The temporalis fascia is grafted. An incision is made along the edge of the perforation and a ring of epithelium is removed. A strip of mucosal layer is removed from the inner side of the perforation. The middle ear is packed with gelfoam soaked with an antibiotic. The edges of the graft should extend under the margins of the perforation and a small part should also extend over the posterior canal wall. The tympanomeatal flap is then replaced.

=== Overlay technique ===
The temporal fascia is harvested. An incision is made to raise medial meatal skin with tympanic membrane epithelium. The graft is placed on the outer surface of the tympanic membrane and a slit is made to tuck it under the handle of the malleus. The ear is packed with gelfoam and antibiotics, and the incision is closed. Finally, mastoid dressing is performed.

== Advantages ==
- Restores the hearing loss and in some cases, tinnitus
- Checks the re-infection from external auditory canal and eustachian tube
- Checks aeroallergens reaching the exposed middle ear mucosa, leading to persistent ear discharge

== Contraindications ==
- Active discharge from the middle ear
- Nasal allergy, which should be controlled before surgery
- When the other ear is dead or not suitable for hearing
- Otitis externa
- Children below 3 years

== See also ==
- Tympanoplasty
- Myringotomy
