= Cone of light =

The cone of light, or light reflex, is a visible phenomenon which occurs upon examination of the tympanic membrane with an otoscope. Shining light on the tympanic membrane causes a cone-shaped reflection of light to appear in the anterior inferior quadrant. This corresponds to the 4 o'clock to 5 o'clock position in the right eardrum and the 7 o'clock to 8 o'clock position in the left eardrum. The apex of the cone is at the most depressed part of the tympanic membrane, known as the umbo.

== Absence of a cone of light ==
The absence of a cone of light does not necessarily signify an ear disorder, as it could be due to the slope of the tympanic membrane or the shape of the ear canal. However, distortions in the cone of light can also be a sign of increased middle ear pressure or otitis media.
