= Almonia truncatalis =

Scientific classification
- Kingdom: Animalia
- Phylum: Arthropoda
- Class: Insecta
- Order: Lepidoptera
- Family: Crambidae
- Genus: Almonia
- Species: A. truncatalis

Binomial name
- Almonia truncatalis Walker, [1866]

Synonyms
- Almonia onustalis Walker, [1866]

Species of moth

Almonia truncatalis is a moth in the family Crambidae described by Francis Walker in 1866. It is found in Sri Lanka and on Java and Sula.
