= Otic polyp =

- Other names: Aural polyp
- An intermediate magnification of a H&E stained biopsy from an otic polyp.
- Specialty: ENT surgery

An otic polyp or aural polyp is a benign proliferation of chronic inflammatory cells associated with granulation tissue, in response to a longstanding inflammatory process of the middle ear. Medieval physician and surgeon, Al-Zahrawi (Albucasis), is credited with the first description of aural polyps.

== Signs and symptoms ==
Patients usually present with otorrhea, conductive hearing loss, and otalgia, while bleeding and a sensation of a mass are much less common.

== Diagnosis ==
=== Imaging ===
Although imaging is not required to yield a diagnosis, it may be obtained to exclude other disorders, such as a concurrent cholesteatoma.

=== Pathology ===
By gross description, there is usually a solitary, polypoid, reddish mass behind an intact ear drum (tympanic membrane). The tissue is often friable, measuring <2 cm in most cases. All tissue should be processed in order to exclude a concurrent cholesteatoma.

By microscopic exam, the polypoid appearance is maintained, showing a granulation-type tissue reaction with edematous stroma and a rich investment by capillaries. The surface of the polyp is covered by stratified squamous epithelium with a prominent granular cell layer. The tissue is filled with lymphocytes, plasma cells, mast cells, histiocytes, and eosinophils. It is not uncommon to see plasma cells with Russell bodies and Mott cell formation. Depending on length of symptoms, multinucleated giant cells and calcifications may be seen. Other disorders may be concurrently present, especially since this is a post infectious/inflammatory disorder, and these include a cholesterol granuloma, "tunnel clusters" (glandular epithelial inclusions below the surface epithelium), and cholesteatoma.

=== Immunohistochemistry ===
Immunohistochemistry is unnecessary for the diagnosis, but will highlight a mixed B- and T-cell population within the lymphoid component, without light chain (kappa or lambda) restriction. Any muscle markers would be negative.

=== Differential diagnoses ===
The lesion presents in young patients, so the differential for a "polyp", especially when the lymphoid component is crushed or dominant, would include a rhabdomyosarcoma, extramedullary plasmacytoma, and a neuroendocrine adenoma of the middle ear.

== Management ==
Since this lesion is usually a complication of long standing otitis media, it is important to use an appropriate antibiotic therapy regimen. If the patient fails first line antibiotics, then second-line therapies should be employed, especially after appropriate culture and sensitivity testing. Surgery may be required if there is extension into the mastoid bone, or if a concurrent cholesteatoma is identified during surgery or biopsy. In general, patients have an excellent outcome after appropriate therapy.

== Epidemiology ==
This is an uncommon lesion, usually affecting young patients (mean age, 30 years), with a male to female ratio of 2:1. The middle ear is involved, although it may extend to the external auditory canal if there is tympanic membrane perforation.
