= Almonia atratalis =

Scientific classification
- Domain: Eukaryota
- Kingdom: Animalia
- Phylum: Arthropoda
- Class: Insecta
- Order: Lepidoptera
- Family: Crambidae
- Genus: Almonia
- Species: A. atratalis

Binomial name
- Almonia atratalis Rothschild, 1915

Species of moth

Almonia atratalis is a moth in the family Crambidae. It is found in Papua New Guinea.
