= Dodanga =

Scientific classification
- Domain: Eukaryota
- Kingdom: Animalia
- Phylum: Arthropoda
- Class: Insecta
- Order: Lepidoptera
- Family: Crambidae
- Subfamily: Acentropinae
- Genus: Dodanga; Moore, 1886

Genus of moths

Dodanga is a genus of moths of the family Crambidae.

== Species ==
- Dodanga cristata Hampson, 1891
- Dodanga lobipennis Moore, 1884-87
