= Muaaz Tarabichi =

Syrian American otolaryngologist

- Born: December 9, 1959 (age 66)
- Citizenship: Syria
- Occupation: Otolaryngologist

Academic background
- Education: Damascus University School of Medicine; McGill University, Montreal, Canada
- Website: www.drmuaaztarabichi.com

Muaaz Tarabichi is a Syrian American otolaryngologist, lecturer, researcher, and author. He is recognized as the father of endoscopic ear surgery. He is the co-founder of Tarabichi Stammberger Ear and Sinus Institute in Dubai, UAE. He was elected as the chairman of the International Advisory Board of the American Academy of Otolaryngology–Head and Neck Surgery.

He is the recipient of 1988- American Academy of Otolaryngology-Head and Neck Surgery Award for Excellence in Original Investigation.

== Early life and education ==
Tarabichi enrolled at the Damascus University School of Medicine, Syria in 1977, and in 1981, he had to leave Syria because of political persecution and was a refugee in the UK and then the US. His story of escaping Syria and migrating to the US and Canada was detailed in an article published in ENT & Audiology News and was widely circulated in the ENT medical community. He went to AUC, BWI, where he studied for two years.

In 1984, Tarabichi started his residency training at McGill University, Montreal, Canada. He did a residency in General Surgery for a year, and after that, in Otolaryngology for four years and obtained certification from the American Board of Otolaryngology in 1991.

== Career ==
Tarabichi started his career in 1988 when he opened a private otolaryngology practice in Kenosha, Wisconsin. In 1991, Tarabichi received his specialty certification from the American Board of Otolaryngology. After a decade, Tarabichi moved to Dubai, where he joined the American Hospital as the Head of Otolaryngology in 1998.

Professor Tarabichi is widely recognized as the father of endoscopic ear surgery and he spent much of his life advocating for this technique and teaching it by conducting courses around the globe.

He is founder of the Tarabichi ENT Clinic Tarabichi ENT Clinic, which provides specialized care in the management of ear, nose, and sinus disorders.

Tarabichi has published many articles and was the editor of two North American otolaryngological clinics on EES. He travelled and lectured around the world on Endoscopic Ear Surgery and Transtympanic Eustachian.

=== Tarabichi Stammberger Ear and Sinus Institute ===
In 2020, Tarabichi co-founded the Tarabichi Stammberger Ear and Sinus Institute in Dubai with Heinz Stammberger. This institution aims to bring forth advancement in endoscopic ear and sinus surgery. To facilitate such advancements, TSESI offers fully-funded fellowships to the trainees. The institute consists of a wet lab and broadcasting and video production facilities as well as surgical and clinical patient care.

== Endoscopic ear surgery ==
He pioneered and disseminated the practice of exclusive Transcanal Endoscopic Ear Surgery during the late 1990s. Dr. Tarabichi challenged the microscopic paradigm, earning him recognition as the "father of endoscopic ear surgery."

Dr. Tarabichi employed rigid Hopkins rod endoscopes with wide-angle and angled lenses such as 30° and 45°, bypassing the need for external incisions.

This approach known as transcanal Endoscopic ear surgery (TEES), allowed the surgical team to operate through the external auditory canal, minimizing trauma and eliminating surgical scars.

Tarabichi mapped out hidden structures within the tympanic cavity, such as the micro-conformations of the protympanum and the protiniculum.

This mapping facilitated a shift to functional ear surgery. Otologists were equipped to inspect and restore the mucosal tympanic ventilation pathways that are critical to preventing chronic middle ear infections and cholesteatoma recurrence.

=== Global advocacy ===
Dr. Tarabichi cataloged operational data, illustrating that the "one-handed" endoscopic technique could achieve equal or superior functional and audiological outcomes compared to traditional microscope techniques.

The global otolaryngology literature witnessed from six endoscopy-related publications in 1990 to hundreds of peer-reviewed articles tracking the widespread clinical adoption of TEES.

Dr. Tarabichi also founded dedicated international working groups and established foundational training institutes.

== Appointments & membership ==
- Chairman of the Middle East Academy of Otolaryngology
- Editorial Board of Journal of International Advanced Otology
- Founding Board member of the International working Group on Endoscopic Ear Surgery and chair of the 1st world Congress on Endoscopic Ear Surgery which was held and Dubai and Co Chair of the 2nd World Congress on Endoscopic Ear Surgery in Bologne, Italy
- Past Chair of the International Advisory Board at the American Academy of Otolaryngology-Head and Neck Surgery
- Past member editorial board of The Laryngoscope
- Past Coordinator for Continuing Medical Education at the ORL-HNS Society, Emirates Medical Association

== Selected publications ==
- Deafness in the Developing World: The Place of Cochlear Implantation. Journal of Laryngology and Otology, 2008:122:877-880
- Endoscopic Management of Limited Attic Cholesteatoma. Laryngoscope, 2004;114:1157–1162
- Endoscopic Management of Cholesteatoma: long-term results, 2000 Jun; 122(6):874-81
- Characteristics of sinus-related pain, 2000 Jun; 122(6):842-7
- Endoscopic Middle Ear Surgery, 1999 Jan; 108(1):39-46
- Endoscopic Management of Acquired Cholesteatoma, 1997 Sep; 18(5):544-9
- Comparison of short nozzle and long nozzle spray in sinonasal drug delivery: a cadaveric study
- Ear, Nose & Throat, 2019; 10.1177
- Feasibility and Safety of Transtympanic Balloon Dilatation of Eustachian Tube
- Otology & Neurotology, 2018
- Cochlear implants in developing countries: practical and ethical considerations
- Current Opinion in Otolaryngology & Head and Neck Surgery, 2018
- The Role of Transtympanic. Dilatation of the. Eustachian Tube During Chronic. Ear Surgery.
- Otolaryngologic Clinics of North America, 2016

== Awards ==
- 1988- AAO-HNS Award for Excellence in Original Investigation for his study on application of finite element methods
- 1986- Montreal Medico-Surgical Society Annual Resident Research Award
