= Dodanga cristata =

Scientific classification
- Kingdom: Animalia
- Phylum: Arthropoda
- Class: Insecta
- Order: Lepidoptera
- Family: Crambidae
- Genus: Dodanga
- Species: D. cristata

Binomial name
- Dodanga cristata Hampson, 1891

Synonyms
- Arrade cristata Hampson; Almonia cristata

Species of moth

Dodanga cristata is a species of moth in the family Crambidae. It was described by George Hampson in 1891. It is found in India and Sri Lanka.

Its wingspan is about 18 mm. The male has a fulvous-yellow body. Its head is roughly scaled and its abdomen is tinged with fuscous. The tarsi of the forelegs are extremely slender. The forewings have indistinct waved subbasal and antemedial lines and a white is speck found at the end of the cell. There is a postmedial line which is highly excurved around the cell. A submarginal dentate line with black patches found beyond it at the middle and outer angle. The tufts on the inner margin are black. Some white specks are found on the costa towards the apex. The hindwings are pale fuscous.
