= UY Scuti (disambiguation) =

UY Scuti is a star in the constellation Scutum.

UY Scuti may also refer to:

- UY Scuti (Olamide album), 2021
- UY Scuti (Young Thug album), 2025
- Uy Scuti Bøyz, 2026
