= Dodanga lobipennis =

Scientific classification
- Kingdom: Animalia
- Phylum: Arthropoda
- Class: Insecta
- Order: Lepidoptera
- Family: Crambidae
- Genus: Dodanga
- Species: D. lobipennis

Binomial name
- Dodanga lobipennis Moore, [1886]

Synonyms
- Almonia lobipennis

Species of moth

Dodanga lobipennis is a species of moth in the family Crambidae. It was described by Frederic Moore in 1884–87. It is found in Sri Lanka.
