= Scutum (disambiguation) =

A scutum is a design of Roman shield.

Scutum may also refer to:

- Scutum (constellation)
- Scutum–Centaurus Arm, an arm in the Milky Way galaxy
- Scute, a zootomical term
- Scutum, a sharp bony spur at Prussak's space of the ear
