= Heinz Stammberger =

German-Austrian surgeon (1946–2018)

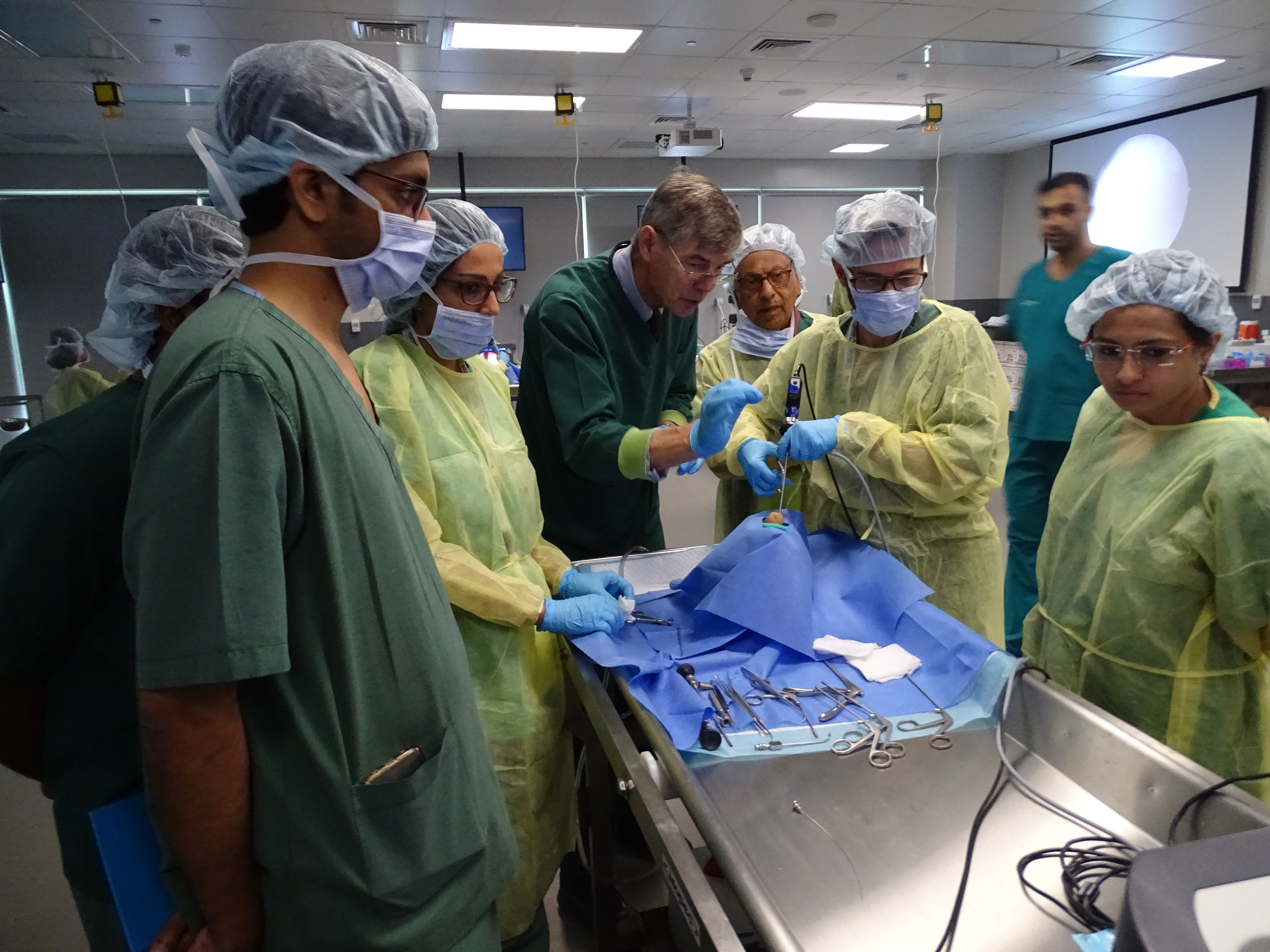
Professor Stammberger teaching at the Tarabichi Stammberger Ear and Sinus Institute

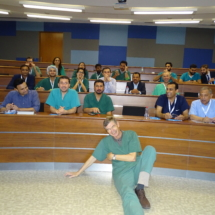
Professor Stammberger at the conclusion of one of his courses at TSESI.

Heinz Stammberger (1946–2018) was a German-Austrian teacher, and researcher in the field of sinus surgery and otolaryngology. He was an emeritus Professor and Head of the Department of General ORL, H&NS of the Medical University of Graz.

== Work ==
Stammberger was widely recognized as the father of endoscopic sinus surgery. He started in 1975 working in the ENT department at Graz under the supervision of Prof Messerklinger who developed his endoscopic approach to sinus disease. He learned the basics of endoscopic surgery in Graz and spent his life advocating and teaching FESS philosophy around the world.

Heinz Stammberger Award has been created in 2019 to pay tribute to the Stammberger through an annual award by the Middle East Academy of Otolaryngology-Head and Neck Surgery (MEAO-HNS). Professor Stammberger co-founded TSESI: Tarabichi Stammberger Ear and Sinus Institute, dedicated to teaching and research in the field of endoscopic ear and sinus surgery.

== Honors ==
Professor Stammberger received honorary fellowships of the Royal Colleges of Surgeons of England, Edinburgh and the American College of Surgeons. He received multiple prizes and awards including the Georg Davey Howell from the University of London, the ERS Award of Merit and the Cottle Golden Head Mirror.
