= Myringotomy =

Surgical procedure on the eardrum

- ICD-9-CM: 20.020.0120.09

A myringotomy is a surgical procedure in which an incision is created in the eardrum (tympanic membrane) to relieve pressure caused by excessive buildup of fluid, or to drain pus from the middle ear. A tympanostomy tube may be inserted through the eardrum to keep the middle ear aerated for a prolonged time and to prevent reaccumulation of fluid. Without the insertion of a tube, the incision usually heals spontaneously within two to three weeks. Depending on the type, the tube is either naturally extruded in 6 to 12 months or removed during a minor procedure.

Those requiring myringotomy usually have an obstructed or dysfunctional eustachian tube that is unable to perform drainage or ventilation in its usual fashion. Before the invention of antibiotics, myringotomy without tube placement was also used as a major treatment of severe acute otitis media (middle ear infection).

== Nomenclature ==
The words myringotomy, tympanotomy, tympanostomy, and tympanocentesis overlap in meaning. The first two are always synonymous, and the third is often used synonymously. The core idea with each is cutting a hole in the eardrum to allow fluid to pass through it. Sometimes a distinction is drawn between myringotomy/tympanotomy and tympanostomy, in parallel with the general distinction between an -otomy (cutting) and an -ostomy (creating a stoma with some degree of permanence or semipermanence). In this distinction, only a tympanostomy involves tympanostomy tubes and creates a semipermanent stoma. This distinction in usage is not always made. The word tympanocentesis specifies that centesis (the removal of fluid) is being done.

Etymologically, myringotomy (myringo-, from Latin myringa "eardrum", + -tomy) and tympanotomy (tympano- + -tomy) both mean "eardrum cutting", and tympanostomy (tympano- + -stomy means "making an eardrum stoma".

== History ==
In 1649, Jean Riolan the Younger accidentally pierced a patient's eardrum while cleaning it with an ear spoon. Surprisingly, the patient's hearing improved. There are also reports from the 17th and 18th centuries describing separate experiments exploring the function of the eardrum. In particular, the animal experiments of Thomas Willis were expanded upon by Sir Astley Cooper, who presented two papers to the Royal Society in 1801 on his observations that myringotomy could improve hearing. First, he showed that two patients with perforations of both eardrums could hear perfectly well, despite conventional wisdom that this would result in deafness. Second, he demonstrated that deafness caused by obstruction of the Eustachian tube could be relieved by myringotomy, which equalized the pressure on each side of the tympanic membrane.

Widespread inappropriate use of the procedure later led to it falling out of use. However, it was reintroduced by Hermann Schwartze in the 19th century. An inherent problem became recognized, namely the tendency of the tympanic membrane to heal spontaneously and rapidly, reversing the beneficial effects of the perforation. In order to prevent this, a tympanostomy tube, initially made of gold foil, was placed through the incision to prevent it from closing. In 1819 the French physician Antoine Saissy (1756–1822) tried to keep the myringotomy unsuccessfully open with Catgut. Ádám Politzer, a Hungarian-born otologist practicing in Vienna, experimented with rubber in 1886. The German otologist Rudolf Voltolini (1819–1889) created in 1874 a grommet made of gold and later on one made of aluminium. The vinyl tube used today was introduced by Beverly Armstrong in 1954.

== Indications ==
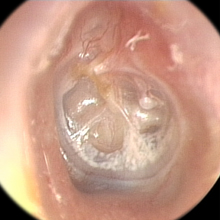
Retracted eardrum

There are numerous indications for tympanostomy in the pediatric age group, the most frequent including chronic otitis media with effusion (OME) which is unresponsive to antibiotics, and recurrent otitis media. Adult indications differ somewhat and include Eustachian tube dysfunction with recurrent signs and symptoms, including fluctuating hearing loss, vertigo, tinnitus, and a severe retraction pocket in the tympanic membrane. Recurrent episodes of barotrauma, especially with flying, diving, or hyperbaric chamber treatment, may merit consideration.

== Procedure ==
Myringotomy is usually performed as an outpatient procedure. General anesthesia is preferred in children, while local anesthesia suffices for adults. The ear is washed and a small incision made in the eardrum. Any fluid that is present is then aspirated, the tube of choice inserted, and the ear packed with cotton to control any slight bleeding that might occur. This is known as conventional (or cold knife) myringotomy and usually heals in one to two days.

A new variation (called tympanolaserostomy or laser-assisted tympanostomy) uses a CO_{2} laser, and is performed with a computer-driven laser and a video monitor to pinpoint a precise location for the hole. The laser takes one-tenth of a second to create the opening, without damaging surrounding skin or other structures. This perforation remains patent for several weeks and provides ventilation of the middle ear without the need for tube placement.

Though laser myringotomies maintain patency slightly longer than cold-knife myringotomies (two to three weeks for laser and two to three days for cold knife without tube insertion), they have not proven to be more effective in the management of effusion. One randomized controlled study found that laser myringotomies are safe but less effective than ventilation tube in the treatment of chronic OME. Multiple occurrences in children, a strong history of allergies in children, the presence of thick mucoid effusions, and history of tympanostomy tube insertion in adults, make it likely that laser tympanostomy will be ineffective.

Various tympanostomy tubes are available. Traditional metal tubes have been replaced by more popular silicon, titanium, polyethylene, gold, stainless steel, or fluoroplastic tubes. More recent ones are coated with antibiotics and phosphorylcholine.

== Aftercare ==
There is little scientific evidence to guide the care of the ear after tubes have been inserted. A single, randomized trial found statistical benefit to using ear protective devices when swimming although the size of the benefit was quite small. In the absence of strong evidence, general opinion has been against the use of ear protection devices. However, protection such as cotton covered with petroleum jelly, ear plugs, or ear putty is recommended for swimming in dirty water (lakes, rivers, oceans, or non-chlorinated pools) to prevent ear infections. For bathing, shampooing, or surface-water swimming in chlorinated pools, no ear protection is recommended.

== Complications ==
The placement of tubes is not a cure. If middle ear disease has been severe or prolonged enough to justify tube placement, there is a strong possibility that the child will continue to have episodes of middle ear inflammation or fluid collection. There may be early drainage through the tube (tube otorrhea) in about 15% of patients in the first two weeks after placement, and developing in 25% more than three months after insertion, although usually not a longterm problem. Otorrhea is considered to be secondary to bacterial colonization. The most commonly isolated organism is Pseudomonas aeruginosa, while the most troublesome is Methicillin-resistant Staphylococcus aureus (MRSA). Some practitioners use topical antibiotic drops in the postoperative period, but research shows that this practice does not eradicate the bacterial biofilm. A laboratory study showed that tubes covered in the antibiotic vancomycin prevented in-vitro formation of MRSA biofilm as compared to noncoated ones, although no study has been conducted on humans yet. Comparing phosphorylcholine-coated fluoroplastic tympanostomy tubes to uncoated fluoroplastic tympanostomy tubes showed no statistically significant difference in the incidence of post-operative otorrhea, tube blockage, or extrusion.

== Efficacy ==
Evidence suggests that tympanostomy tubes only offer a short-term hearing improvement in children with simple OME who have no other serious medical problems. No effect on speech and language development has yet been shown.

A retrospective study of success rates in 96 adults and 130 children with otitis media treated with CO_{2} laser myringotomy showed about a 50% cure rate at six months in both groups. To date, there have been no published systematic reviews.

Balloon dilation eustachian tuboplasty (BDET), a new treatment, has proven to be effective in treating OME secondary to eustachian tube dysfunction. However, the number of patients in the studies cited, 22 and 8 respectively and 18 in the tympanometric study, is extremely small and simply points to the need for large, well-controlled studies.

== See also ==
- Myringoplasty
- Otitis media
- List of surgeries by type
