= Eardrum =

Membrane separating the external ear from the middle ear

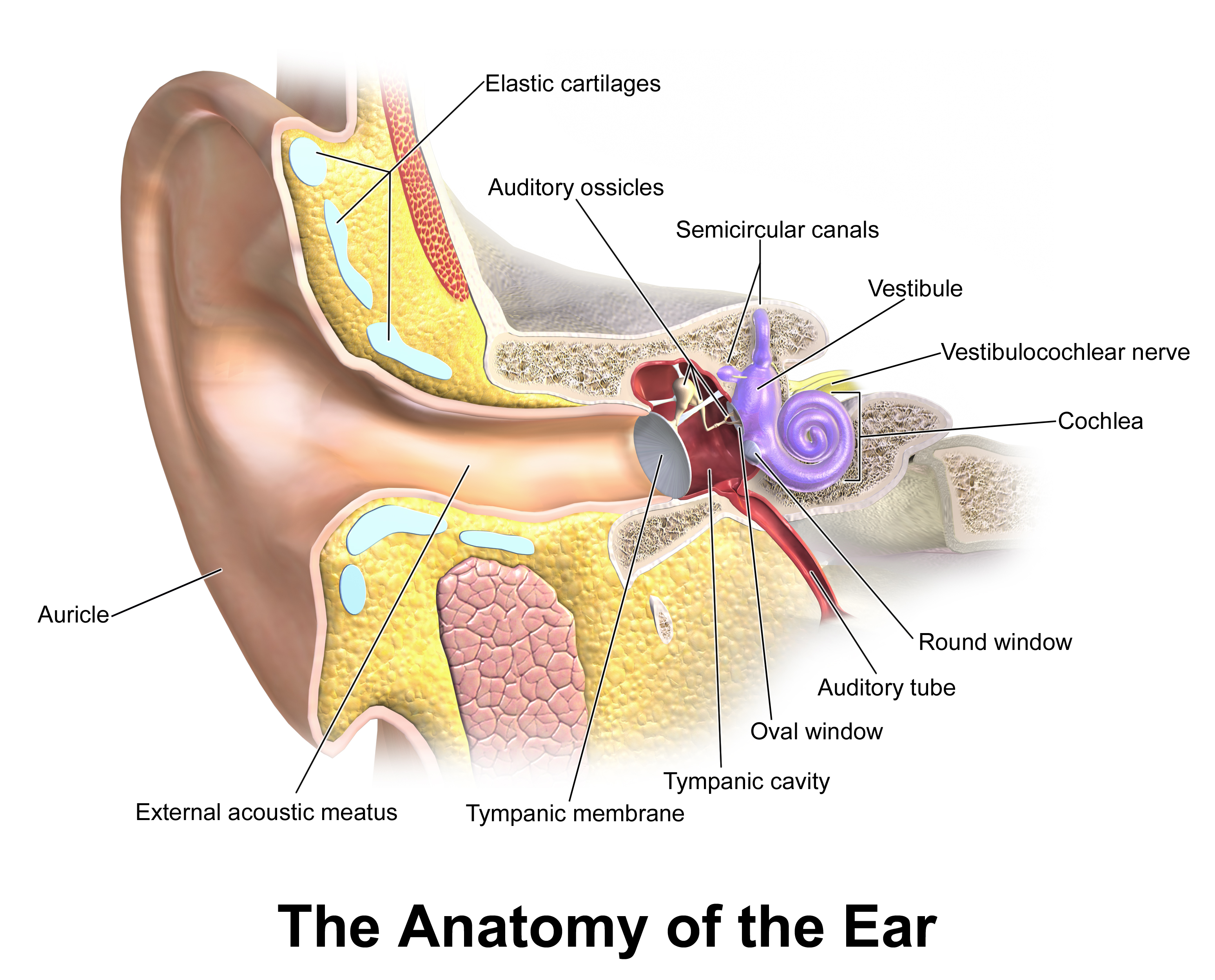

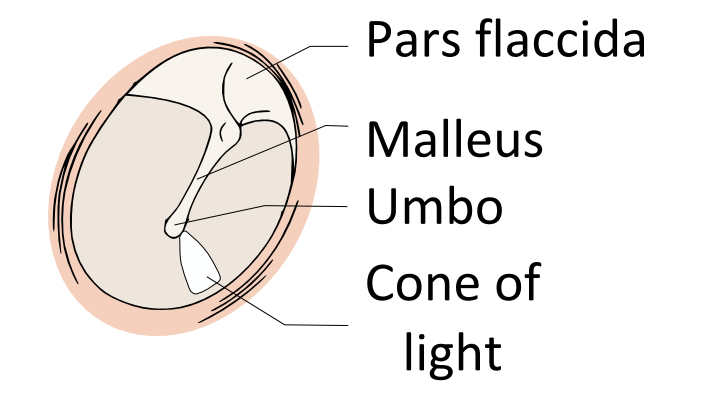
- Right eardrum as seen through a speculum

Details

Identifiers
- Latin: membrana tympanica; myringa
- MeSH: D014432
- TA98: A15.3.01.052
- TA2: 6870
- FMA: 9595

In the anatomy of humans and various other tetrapods, the eardrum, also called the tympanic membrane or myringa, is a thin, cone-shaped membrane that separates the external ear from the middle ear. Its function is to transmit changes in pressure of sound from the air to the ossicles inside the middle ear, and thence to the oval window in the fluid-filled cochlea. The ear thereby converts and amplifies vibration in the air to vibration in cochlear fluid. The malleus bone bridges the gap between the eardrum and the other ossicles.

Rupture or perforation of the eardrum can lead to conductive hearing loss. Collapse or retraction of the eardrum can cause conductive hearing loss or cholesteatoma.

== Structure ==
=== Orientation and relations ===
The tympanic membrane is oriented obliquely in the anteroposterior, mediolateral, and superoinferior planes. Consequently, its superoposterior end lies lateral to its anteroinferior end.

Anatomically, it relates superiorly to the middle cranial fossa, posteriorly to the ossicles and facial nerve, inferiorly to the parotid gland, and anteriorly to the temporomandibular joint.

=== Regions ===
The eardrum is divided in to two general regions: the pars flaccida and the pars tensa. The relatively fragile pars flaccida lies above the lateral process of the malleus between the Notch of Rivinus and the anterior and posterior malleal folds. Consisting of two layers and appearing slightly pinkish in hue, it is associated with Eustachian tube dysfunction and cholesteatomas.

The larger pars tensa consists of three layers: skin, fibrous tissue, and mucosa. Its thick periphery forms a fibrocartilaginous ring called the annulus tympanicus or Gerlach's ligament. The middle fibrous layer, containing radial, circular, and parabolic fibers, encloses the handle of malleus. Though comparatively robust, the pars tensa is the region more commonly associated with perforations.

=== Umbo ===
The manubrium (Latin for "handle") of the malleus is firmly attached to the medial surface of the membrane as far as its center, drawing it toward the tympanic cavity. The lateral surface of the membrane is thus concave. The most depressed aspect of this concavity is termed the umbo (Latin for "shield boss").

=== Nerve supply ===
Sensation of the outer surface of the tympanic membrane is supplied mainly by the auriculotemporal nerve, a branch of the mandibular nerve (cranial nerve V_{3}), with contributions from the auricular branch of the vagus nerve (cranial nerve X), the facial nerve (cranial nerve VII), and possibly the glossopharyngeal nerve (cranial nerve IX). The inner surface of the tympanic membrane is innervated by the glossopharyngeal nerve.

== Clinical significance ==
=== Examination ===
When the eardrum is illuminated during a medical examination, a cone of light radiates from the tip of the malleus to the periphery in the anteroinferior quadrant, this is what is known clinically as 5 o'clock.

=== Rupture ===
Unintentional perforation (rupture) has been described in blast injuries and air travel, typically in patients experiencing upper respiratory congestion or general Eustachian tube dysfunction that prevents equalization of pressure in the middle ear. It is also known to occur in swimming, diving (including scuba diving), and martial arts.

Patients with tympanic membrane rupture may experience bleeding, tinnitus, hearing loss, or disequilibrium (vertigo). However, they rarely require medical intervention, as between 80 and 95 percent of ruptures recover completely within two to four weeks. The prognosis becomes more guarded as the force of injury increases.

=== Surgical puncture for treatment of middle ear infections ===
In some cases, the pressure of fluid in an infected middle ear is great enough to cause the eardrum to rupture naturally. Usually, this consists of a small hole (perforation), from which fluid can drain out of the middle ear. If this does not occur naturally, a myringotomy (tympanotomy, tympanostomy) can be performed. A myringotomy is a surgical procedure in which a tiny incision is created in the eardrum to relieve pressure caused by excessive buildup of fluid, or to drain pus from the middle ear. The fluid or pus comes from a middle ear infection (otitis media), which is a common problem in children. A tympanostomy tube is inserted into the eardrum to keep the middle ear aerated for a prolonged time and to prevent reaccumulation of fluid. Without the insertion of a tube, the incision usually heals spontaneously in two to three weeks. Depending on the type, the tube is either naturally extruded in 6 to 12 months or removed during a minor procedure.

Those requiring myringotomy usually have an obstructed or dysfunctional Eustachian tube that is unable to perform drainage or ventilation in its usual fashion. Before the invention of antibiotics, myringotomy without tube placement was also used as a major treatment of severe acute otitis media.

== Society and culture ==
The Bajau people of the Pacific intentionally rupture their eardrums at an early age to facilitate diving and hunting at sea. Many older Bajau therefore have difficulties hearing.

== See also ==
- Middle ear
- Valsalva maneuver to equalize pressure across the eardrum

== Additional images ==
Anatomy of the human right ear.
Brown is outer ear.
Red is middle ear.
Purple is inner ear.

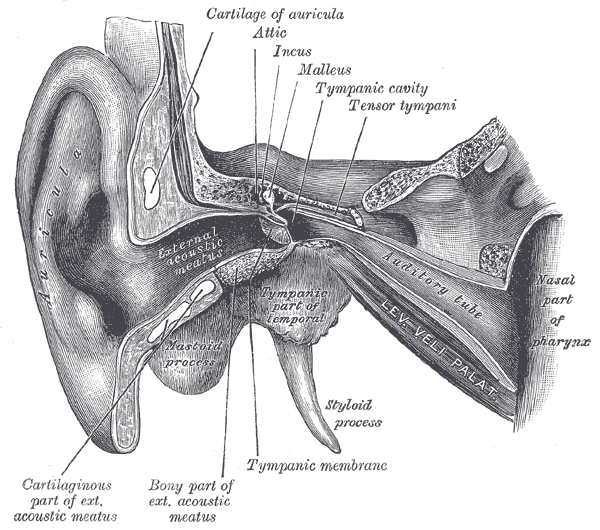
External and middle ear, right side, opened from the front (coronal section)

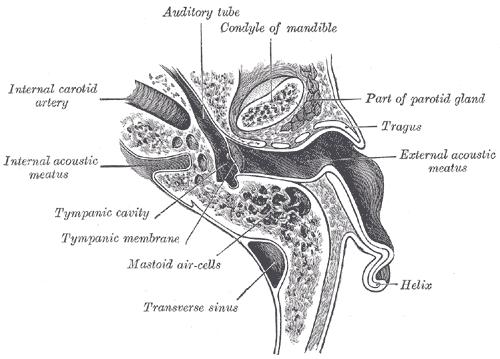
Horizontal section through left ear; upper half of section

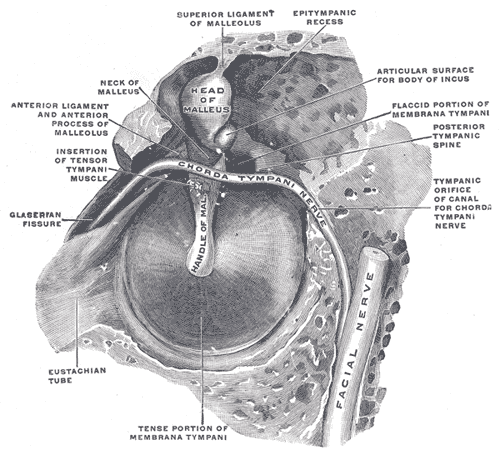
The right membrana tympani with the hammer and the chorda tympani, viewed from within, from behind, and from above

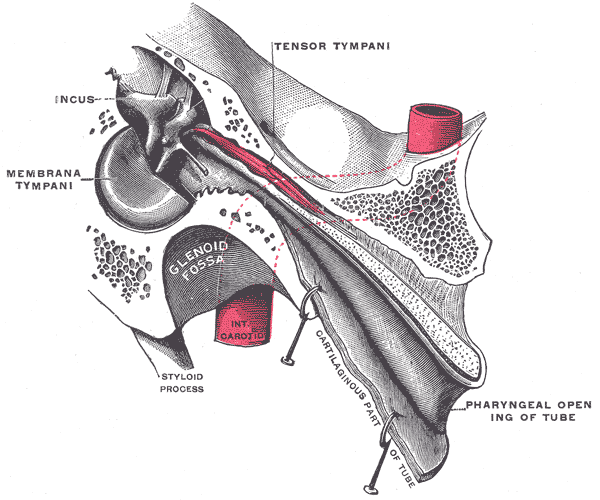
Auditory tube, laid open by a cut in its long axis

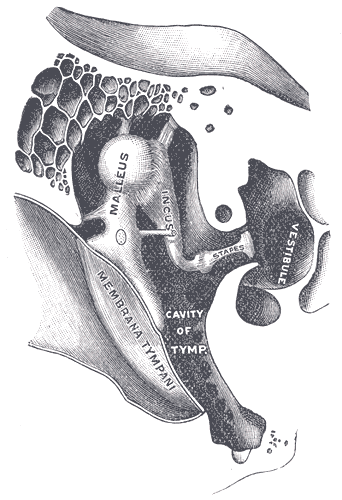
Chain of ossicles and their ligaments, seen from the front in a vertical, transverse section of the tympanum (tympanic cavity)

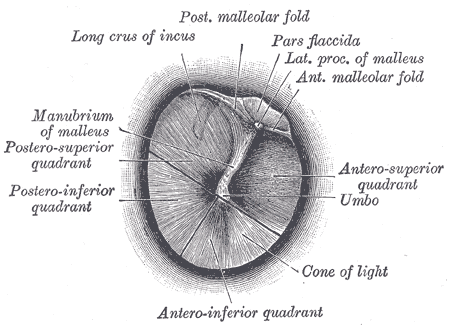
Right eardrum as seen through a speculum

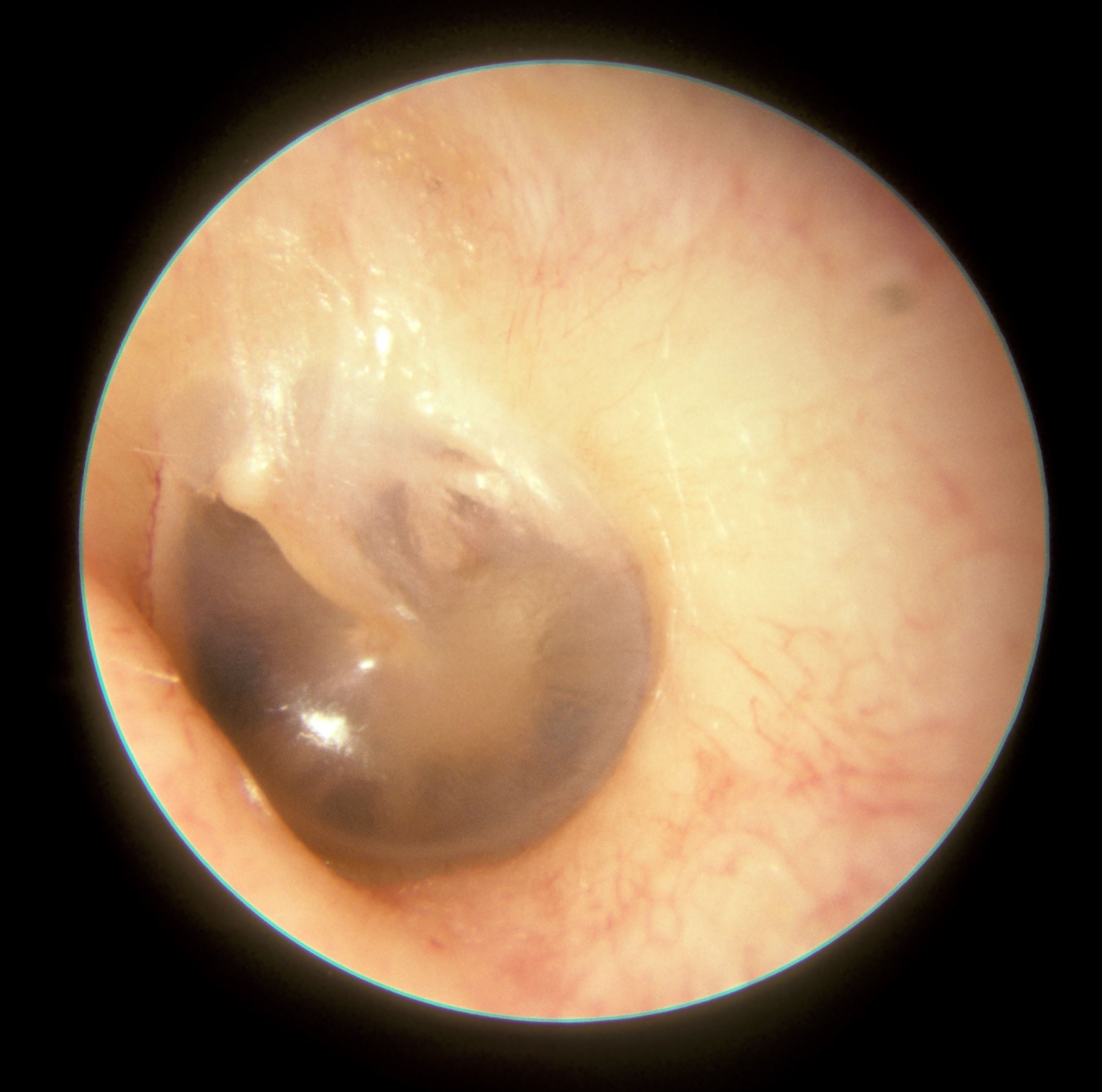
This is a normal left eardrum.

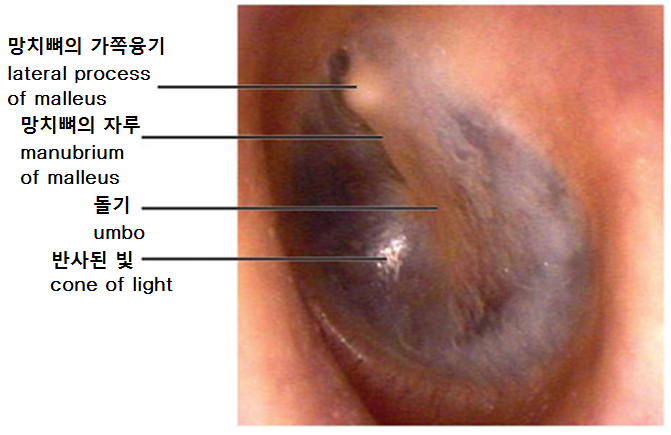
Tympanic membrane viewed by otoscope

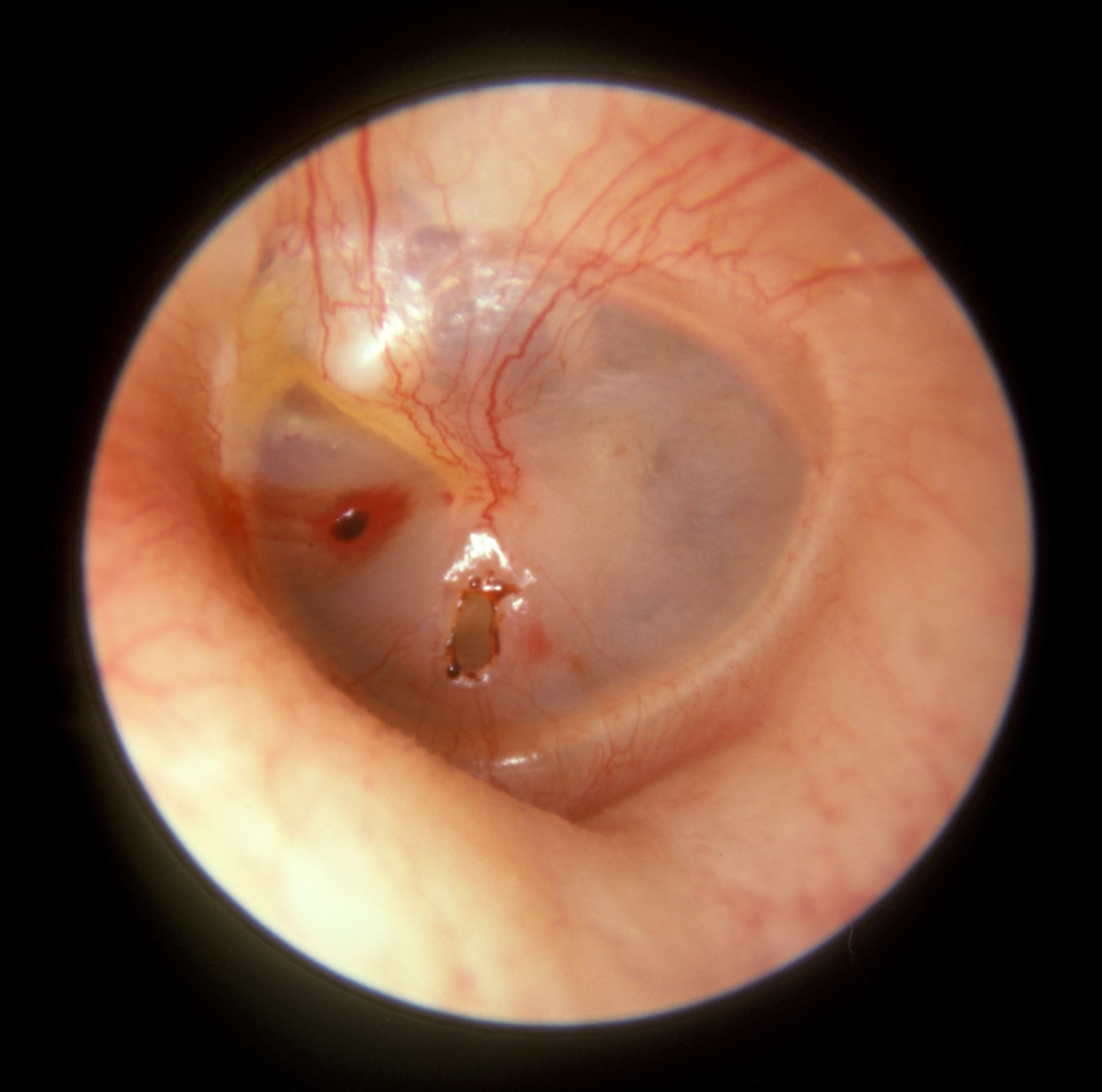
The oval perforation in this left tympanic membrane was the result of a slap on the ear

A subtotal perforation of the right tympanic membrane resulting from a previous severe otitis media

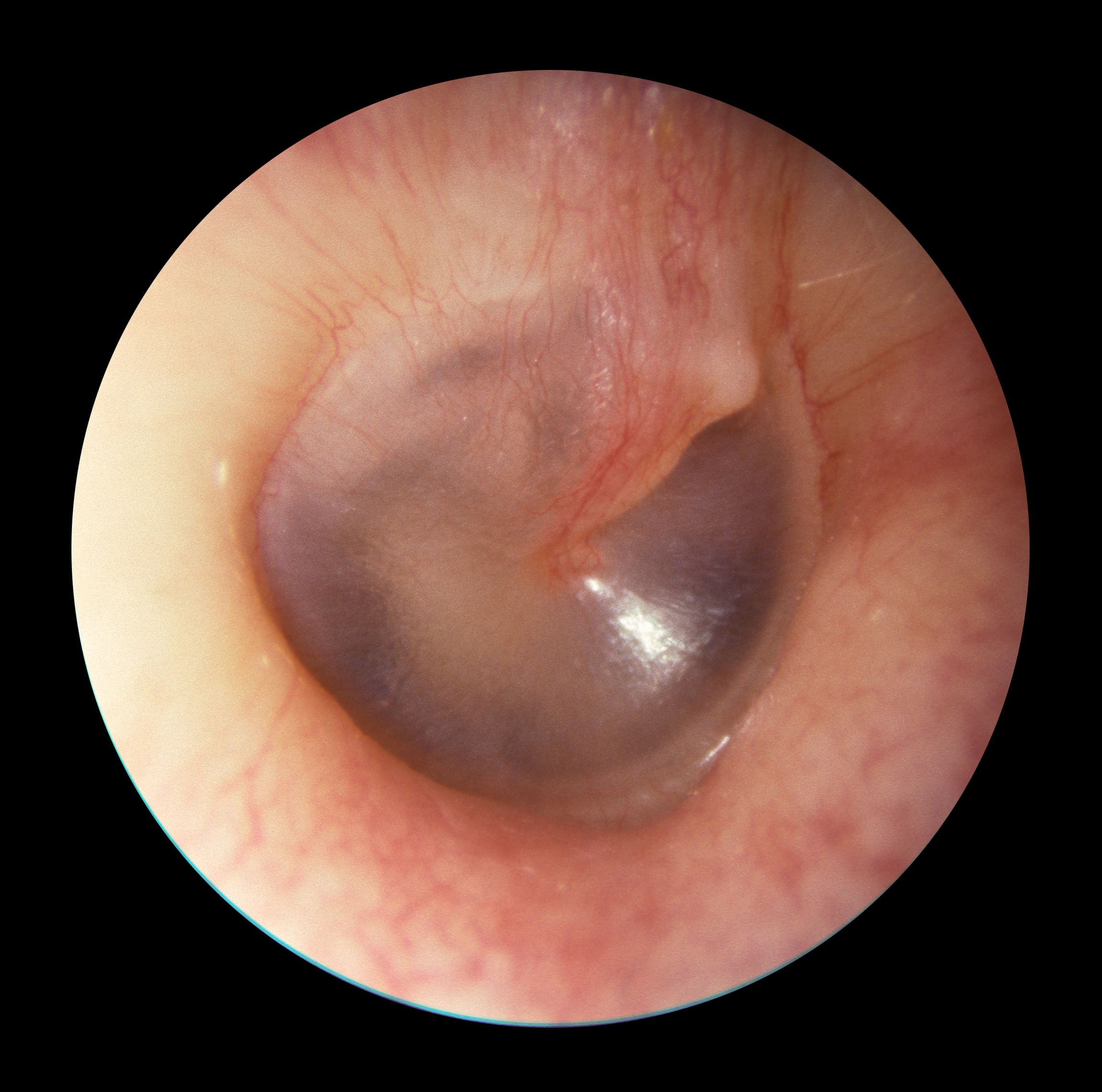
A normal human right tympanic membrane (eardrum)

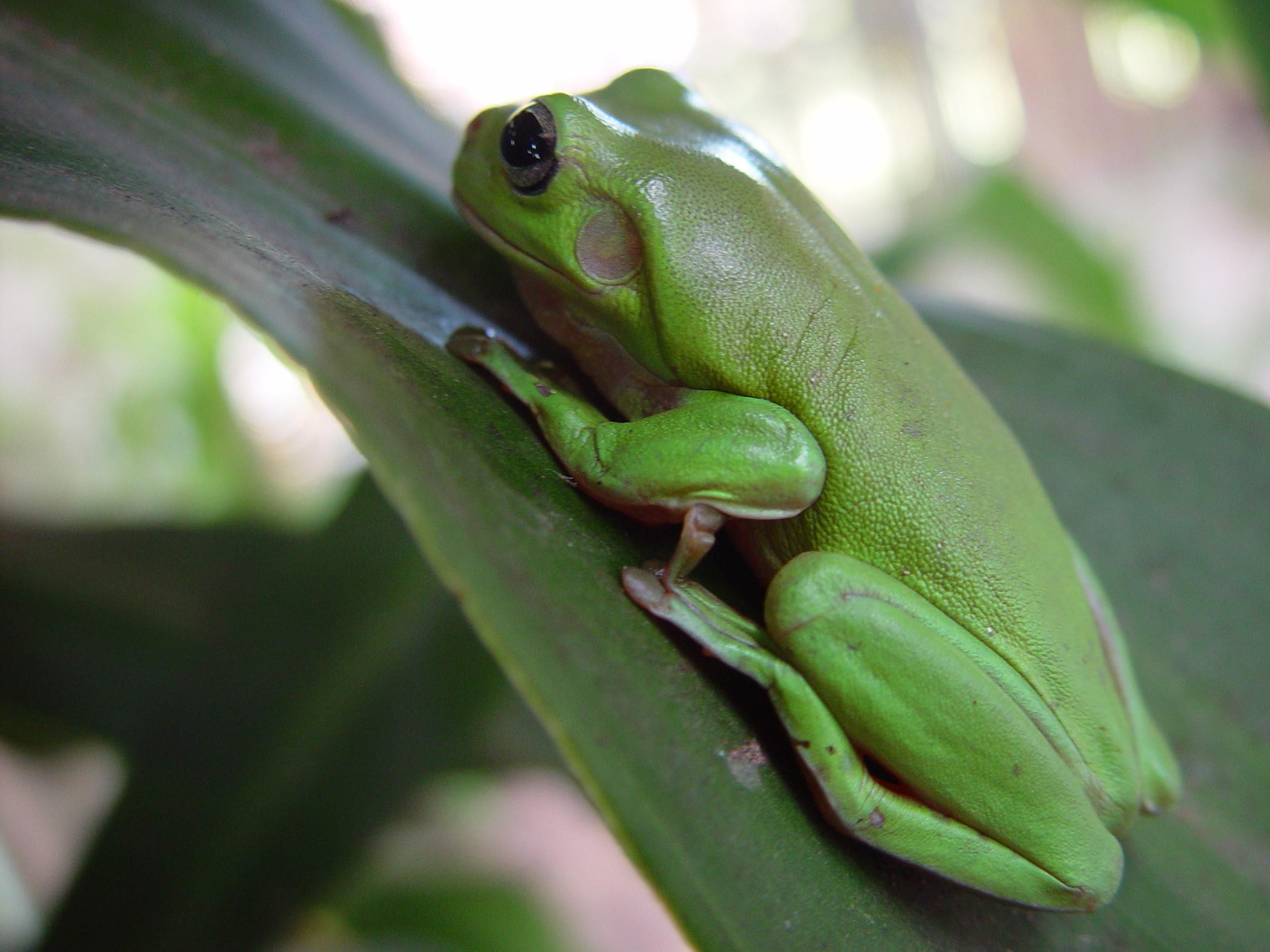
Frog on leaf showing tympanum
