= Otic =

Otic means pertaining to the ear. It can refer to:

- Otic ganglion, nerve cells in ear
- Otic polyp, benign growth in middle ear
- Otic capsule, another name for bony labyrinth
- Otic drops, another name for ear drops
- Otic notch, notch in skull of some species
- Otic pit, developmental stage of ear
- Otic placode, developmental stage of ear
- Otic vesicle, developmental stage of ear

== Others ==
- Ohio Turnpike and Infrastructure Commission, the body overseeing the Ohio Turnpike
- Otic Records, record label founded by Bobby Naughton
