= Middle ear implant =

Hearing-aid device

A middle ear implant is a hearing device that is surgically implanted into the middle ear. They help people with conductive, sensorineural or mixed hearing loss to hear.

Middle ear implants work by improving the conduction of sound vibrations from the middle ear to the inner ear. There are two types of middle ear devices: active and passive. Active middle ear implants (AMEI) consist of an external audio processor and an internal implant, which actively vibrates the structures of the middle ear. Passive middle ear implants (PMEIs) are sometimes known as ossicular replacement prostheses, TORPs or PORPs. They replace damaged or missing parts of the middle ear, creating a bridge between the outer ear and the inner ear, so that sound vibrations can be conducted through the middle ear and on to the cochlea. Unlike AMEIs, PMEIs contain no electronics and are not powered by an external source.

PMEIs are the usual first-line surgical treatment for conductive hearing loss, due to their lack of external components and cost-effectiveness. However, each patient is assessed individually as to whether an AMEI or PMEI would bring more benefit. This is especially true if the patient has already had several surgeries with PMEIs.

== Active middle ear implant ==
=== Parts ===
An active middle ear implant (AMEI) has two parts: an internal implant and an external audio processor. The microphone of the audio processor picks up sounds from the environment. The processor then converts these acoustic signals into digital signals and sends them to the implant through the skin. The implant sends the signals to the Floating Mass Transducer (FMT): a small vibratory part that is surgically fixed either on one of the three ossicles or against the round window of the cochlea. The FMT vibrates and sends sound vibrations to the cochlea. The cochlea converts these vibrations into nerve signals and sends them to the brain, where they are interpreted as sound.

=== Indications ===
AMEIs are intended for patients with mild-to-severe sensorineural hearing loss, as well as those with conductive or mixed hearing loss. They can be used by adults and children over the age of 5.

==== Sensorineural hearing loss ====
An AMEI can be beneficial for patients with mild-to-severe sensorineural hearing loss who have an intact ossicular chain and healthy middle ear, but who either cannot wear hearing aids or who do not get sufficient benefit from them. Reasons for not being able to wear hearing aids include earmold allergies, skin problems, narrow, collapsed or closed ear canals, or malformed ears. In cases of sensorineural hearing loss, the FMT is usually attached to the incus.

==== Conductive or mixed hearing loss ====
An AMEI is also indicated for patients with conductive or mixed hearing loss with bone conduction thresholds from 45 dB in the low frequencies to 65 dB in the high frequencies. In these cases, the FMT can be coupled to various parts of the middle ear, depending on the patient's pathology:

- The oval window, causing stimulation of the cochlea in patients without an ossicular chain.
- The round window, causing reverse stimulation of the cochlea in patients without an ossicular chain.
- The mobile stapes in patients with absence or fixation of other ossicles, usually in cases of chronic otitis media or malformations.

=== Efficacy ===
AMEIs have been shown by several studies to be equal or superior to both hearing aids and bone conduction implants. Lee et al used the PBmax test to study speech intelligibility in patients before and after receiving an AMEI. All patients had used hearing aids pre-implantation. The researchers found that speech intelligibility improved with the AMEI, particularly in patients with a down-sloping hearing loss. These findings were supported by Iwasaki et al, who found that both speech intelligibility and quality of life improved after implantation with an AMEI, applied to the round window.

AMEIs can also offer improved hearing performance over bone conduction implants for patients with mixed hearing loss. Mojallal et al found that patients whose mixed hearing loss was treated with an AMEI experienced both better word recognition and speech understanding in noise than those who received a bone conduction implant, providing that their bone conduction pure-tone average (0.5 to 4 kHz) was poorer than 35 dB HL.

== Passive middle ear implant ==
=== Parts ===
Passive middle ear implants (PMEI) are ossicular replacement prostheses designed to replace some or all of the ossicular chain in the middle ear. They create a bridge between the outer ear and the inner ear, so that sound vibrations can be conducted through the middle ear and on to the cochlea

There are two types of PMEIs: tympanoplasty implants and stapes implants. Tympanoplasty implants (also known as PORPs or TORPs) are suitable for patients with a mobile stapes footplate, ie. a stapes footplate that moves in the normal way. Either a partial or a total tympanoplasty implant can be used, depending on the condition of the stapes. If the stapes is fixed and cannot transfer vibrations to the inner ear, then a stapes implant would be used.

PMEIs are made from different materials including titanium, teflon, hydroxylapatite, platinum, and nitinol, all of which are suitable for use within the human body. Titanium implants can safely undergo MRIs of up to 7.0 Tesla.

=== Indications ===
==== Tympanoplasty implant ====
The tympanoplasty implant is indicated in cases of congenital or acquired defects of the ossicular chain, due to e.g.:

- Chronic otitis media
- Traumatic injury
- Malformation
- Cholesteatoma

It can also be used to treat patients with inadequate conductive hearing from previous middle ear surgery.

==== Stapes implant ====
The stapesplasty prosthesis is indicated in cases of congenital or acquired defects of the stapes due to e.g.:

- Otosclerosis
- Congenital fixation of the stapes
- Traumatic injury
- Malformation of the ossicular chain/middle ear

It can also be used to treat patients with inadequate conductive hearing from previous stapes surgery.

== See also ==
- Ossicular replacement prosthesis
