= Pedro Jimeno =

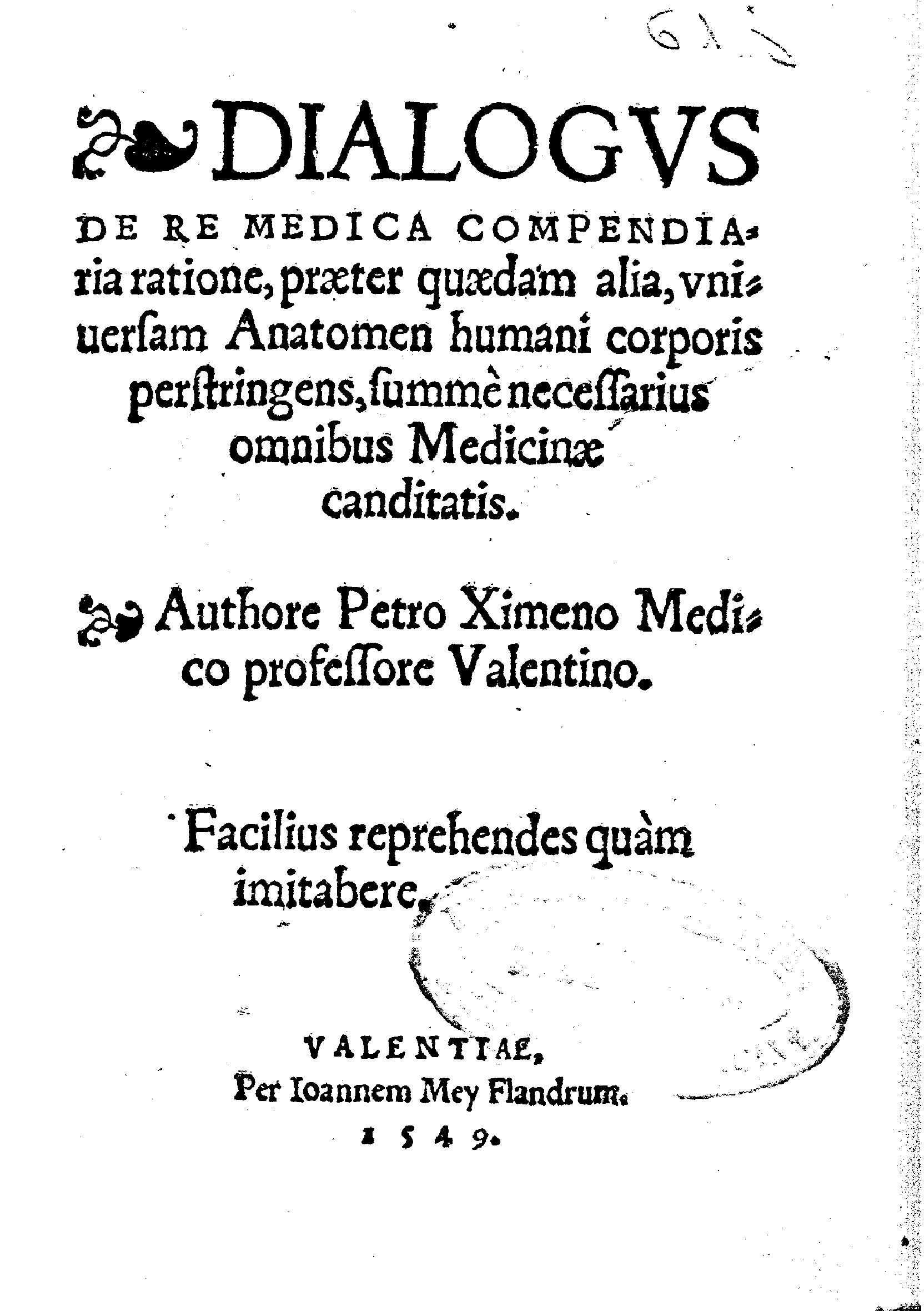
Titlepage of Jimeno's Dialogus

Pedro Jimeno (c. 1515 – c. 1555) was a Valencian anatomist.

Jimeno was born around 1515 in Valencia or in Onda. He first studied the arts at the University of Valencia and then medicine under Andreas Vesalius at the University of Padua. Upon his return to Valencia, he succeeded Pedro Jaime Esteve in the chair of anatomy (anatomía y simples) in 1547. In 1549, he became chair of practical medicine (práctica). In 1550, transferred to the University of Alcalá, where he taught until his death shortly after.

Jimeno was one of the most faithful of Vesalius' students to the latter's innovative teachings and was responsible for introducing Vesalianism to Spain. In Alcalá, he collaborated with the physician Francisco Vallés. He wrote a single book, Dialogus de re medica, compendiaria ratione, praeter quaedam alia, universam anatomen humani corporis perstringens, published at Valencia by Juan Mey in 1549. It was written in the form of a dialogue between the citizen Gaspar and the physician Andrés. It was the first full-length work on Vesalian anatomy in Spain.

The Dialogus contains the first published description of the stapes, the smallest bone in the human body, which Jimeno discovered through dissection. He must have discovered it in 1547 or 1548, later than Giovanni Filippo Ingrassia, who discovered it in 1546. Ingrassia's discovery is corroborated by Gabriele Falloppio, who located the bone on that basis in 1548 and published his account in 1564. Ingrassia's own account was not published until 1603.

Jimeno's work was continued after his death by Luis Collado in the face of opposition from the followers of Jacques Dubois.

== Bibliography ==
- López Piñero, José M. (1979). "The Vesalian Movement in Sixteenth-Century Spain". Journal of the History of Biology. 12 (1): 45–81. JSTOR 4330726.
- O'Malley, C. D. (1972). "Pedro Jimeno: Valencian Anatomist of the Mid-Sixteenth Century". In Allen G. Debus (ed.). Science, Medicine and Society: Essays to Honor Walter Pagel. Vol. 1. Heinemann. pp. 69–72.
- Sánchez Granjel, Luis (2018). "Jimeno, Pedro". Diccionario biográfico español. Real Academia de la Historia.
- Skaarup, Bjørn Okholm (2015). Anatomy and Anatomists in Early Modern Spain. Ashgate.
