= Gabriele Falloppio =

Italian anatomist (1522/23–1562)

The Reverend Gabriele Falloppio
- Born: 1522/1523; Modena, Duchy of Modena
- Died: 9 October 1562 (aged 38–39); Padua, Republic of Venice
- Education: University of Ferrara (M.D., 1552)
- Known for: Medicine
- Scientific career
- Fields: Anatomy; Medicine
- Workplaces: University of Ferrara; University of Pisa; University of Padua
- Doctoral advisor: Antonio Musa Brasavola
- Notable students: Hieronymus Fabricius; Volcher Coiter; Theodor Zwinger

Gabrielle Falloppia (Gabriele Falloppio) (1522/23 – 9 October 1562) was an Italian Catholic priest and anatomist often known by his Latin name Fallopius. He was one of the most important anatomists and physicians of the sixteenth century, giving his name to the fallopian tube.

== Life ==
Falloppio grew up in Modena. His father died early but thanks to the support of affluent relatives he enjoyed a thorough humanist education in Modena, learning Latin and Greek and moving in the local circle of humanist scholars. He was for some years in the service of the Church, among others as a kind of warden at Modena's cathedral, but soon turned to medicine. In 1544, he performed a public anatomy in Modena. In 1545, at the latest, he began to study medicine at the University of Ferrara, at that time one of the best medical schools in Europe. It was there also that he much later, in 1552, when he was already professor in Padua, received his medical doctorate under the guidance of Antonio Musa Brasavola. He taught on medicinal plants in Ferrara but was not professor of anatomy there, as has sometimes been claimed. He also was never a personal student of Andreas Vesalius as is often falsely maintained (he explicitly called himself a student of Vesalius in the sense only that he had read his works). In 1548, he took the chair of anatomy at the University of Pisa. In 1551, he was invited to occupy the chair of anatomy and surgery at the University of Padua and also lectured on medicinal plants or botany. In Padua, he shared his house over years with the German botanist Melchior Wieland which gave rise to some suspicions about the nature of their relationship and got Falloppio involved in Wieland's vitriolic controversy with the irascible botanist Pietro Andrea Mattioli. Falloppio was a very popular teacher and had numerous students. He also ran an extensive medical and surgical practice and took his students with him so they could learn from him. He died in Padua in October 1562, not even 40 years old. His plans for a major illustrated anatomical textbook were thus never realized.

== Contributions ==
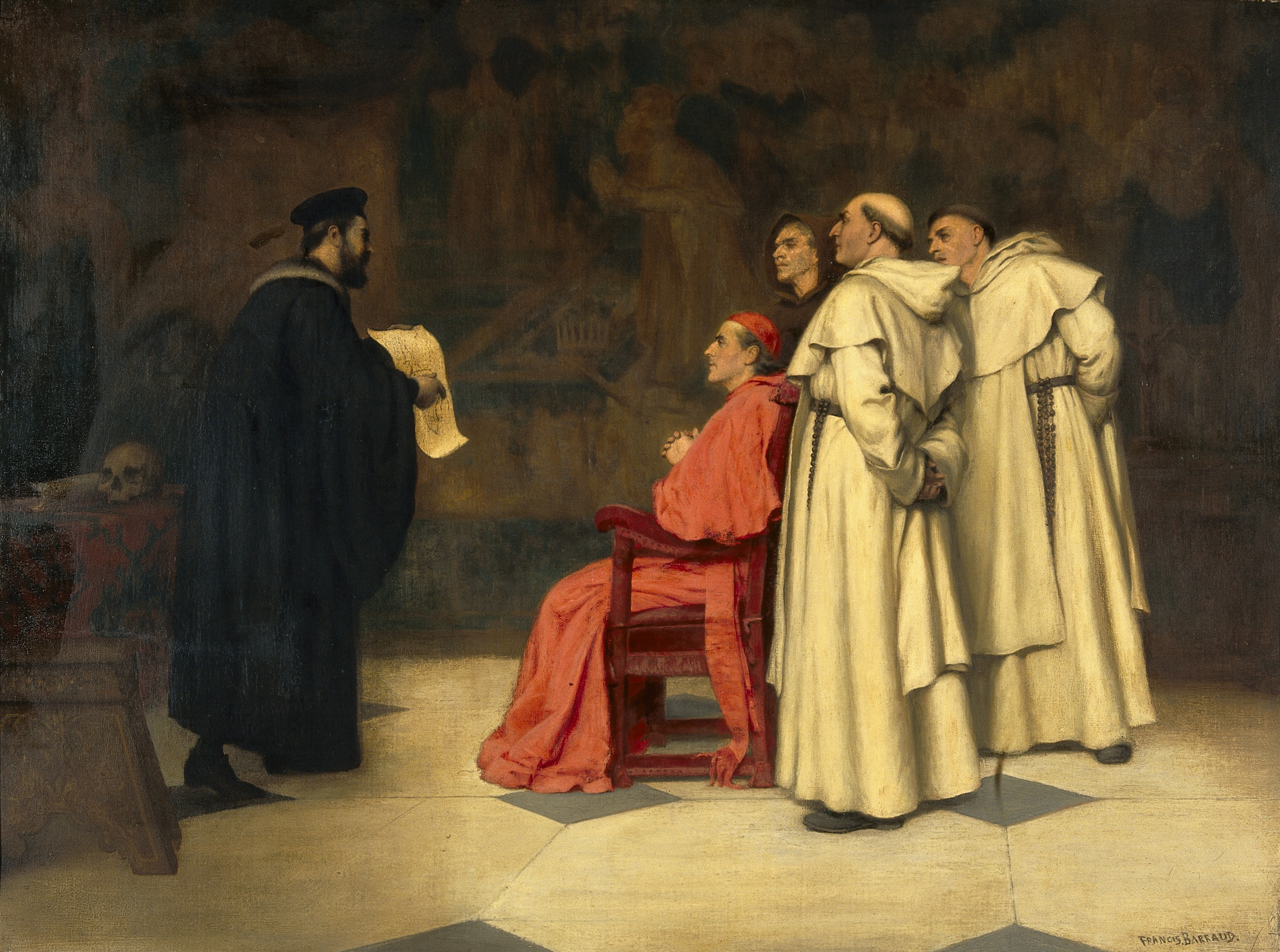
Gabriele Falloppius explaining one of his discoveries to the Cardinal Duke of Ferrara

Falloppio published only one major work during his lifetime, the Observationes anatomicæ, which first came out in 1561. Here he presented his numerous new anatomical findings, correcting and expanding on the works of Galen and Vesalius. Some of his findings referred to the head and the brain. He added much to what was known before about the internal ear and described in detail the tympanum and its relations to the osseous ring in which it is situated. He also described minutely the circular and oval windows (fenestræ) and their communication with the vestibule and cochlea. He was the first to point out the connection between the mastoid cells and the middle ear. His description of the lacrimal ducts in the eye was a marked advance on those of his predecessors and he also gave a detailed account of the ethmoid bone and its cells in the nose. The aquaeductus Fallopii (facial canal), the canal through which the facial nerve passes after leaving the auditory nerve, is also named after him. He also described the Fallopian hiatus, an opening in the anterosuperior part of the petrosal bone.

His contributions to the anatomy of the bones and muscles were very valuable as well. He discovered, among others, the muscle that lifts the upper eyelid. He studied the reproductive organs in both sexes, and gave the first precise description of the uterine tube (fallopian tube), which leads from the ovary to the uterus and bears his name to this day. He was the first to describe the ileocecal valve, which prevents a reflux of fecal matter from the colon to the small intestines, and demonstrated its function to his students. He also was the first to identify the vessels in the abdomen which were later called lacteals because of their milky appearance after meals.

His contributions to practical medicine were also important. He was the first to use an aural speculum for the diagnosis and treatment of diseases of the ear, and his writings on surgical subjects are still of interest. After his death, some of his students published their lectures, in particular, on ulcers, tumors, medical cosmetics, and other surgical topics and on botany and mineral waters. In his lectures, Falloppio also described, around 1555, a linen sheath that previously had been soaked in medicinal substances and then dried and some authors have praised him as the inventor of the condom. The sheath was not to be used during intercourse, however. A man who had intercourse with a woman he suspected of being infected with the French disease or syphilis was to put the sheath over the glans penis after intercourse and leave it there for several hours to destroy infectious matter that might have entered the skin. Some authors have taken exaggerated Falloppio's claim that he tested this sheath on a thousand or more men seriously.

Falloppio also lectured extensively on mineral waters and their medicinal qualities and presented the results of his chemical analysis of the waters from various springs by means of distillation. He argued against Fracastor's theory of fossils, as described as follows in Charles Lyell's Principles of Geology:

Falloppio of Padua conceived that petrified shells had been generated by fermentation in the spots where they were found, or that they had in some cases acquired their form from 'the tumultuous movements of terrestrial exhalations.' Although a celebrated professor of anatomy, he taught that certain tusks of elephants dug up in his time at Puglia were mere earthy concretions, and, consistently with these principles, he even went so far as to consider it not improbable, that the vases of Monte Testaceo at Rome were natural impressions stamped in the soil.

== Legacy ==
Various anatomical structures were described by Falloppio, including Fallopian tube, Fallopian canal, and Fallopian ligament.

A genus of about 12 species of flowering plants bears his name (Fallopia).

== Works ==
- Omnia, quæ adhuc extant opera (1584) (mostly a collection of student notes on Falloppio's lectures)
- Falloppio, Gabriele. 1562. Observationes anatomicae. Venetiis: Apud Marcum Antonium Vlmum. (first published in 1561)
- Kunstbuch Des hocherfarnen und weytberhümpten Herrn Gabrielis Fallopij, der Artzney Doctorn von mancherley nutzlichen Künsten . Sampt einem andern büchlin / durch Christophorum Landrinum außgangen. Manger, Augspurg 1578 Digital edition by the University and State Library Düsseldorf (spurious, wrongly attributed to Falloppio)
- Gabrielis Fallopii Wunderlicher menschlichem Leben gewisser und sehr nutzlicher Secreten drey Bücher : vom Authore selbst in Italienischer Sprach publicirt, jetzund aber Teutscher Nation zu gutem in unser Muttersprach ubersetzet. Iennis / N. Hoffmann, Franckfurt am Mayn 1616 Digital edition by the University and State Library Düsseldorf (spurious, wrongly attributed to Falloppio)

== See also ==
- List of Roman Catholic scientist-clerics
