= Ossicular chain =

Three bones of the middle ear

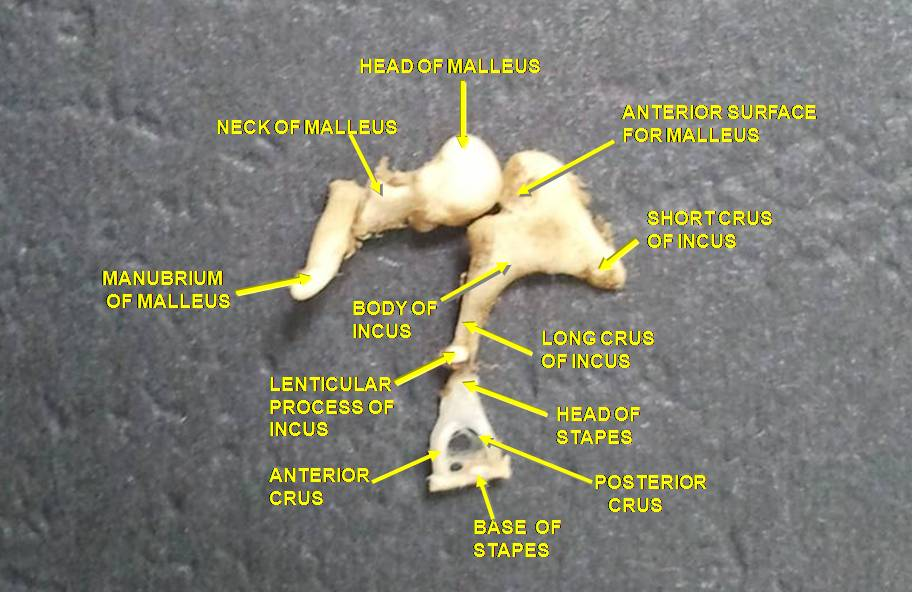
A labelled photograph of the three ossicles in the human ear: the malleus, the incus, and the stapes.

The ossicular chain is a crucial structure in the middle ear, responsible for transmitting sound vibrations from the tympanic membrane to the inner ear. This chain consists of three tiny bones: the malleus, incus, and stapes. They are connected by ligaments and joints that allow for the efficient conduction of sound waves. The ossicular chain is housed in a slender, air-filled cavity within the temporal bone and plays a pivotal role in hearing by amplifying and transmitting sound vibrations.

The primary function of the ossicular chain is to transmit sound vibrations from the external ear to the inner ear, where they are converted into electrical signals for the brain to interpret as sound. Any dysfunction or damage to the ossicular chain, such as ossicular discontinuity, can lead to conductive hearing loss. In such cases, the transmission of sound from the outer ear to the inner ear is compromised. This type of hearing loss is typically treatable with surgical reconstruction of the ossicular chain.

== Congenital anomalies ==
=== Congenital conductive hearing loss ===
Congenital conductive hearing loss can be defined as any malformation of the auditory ossicles during embryonic development.
