= Giovanni Filippo Ingrassia =

Italian physician

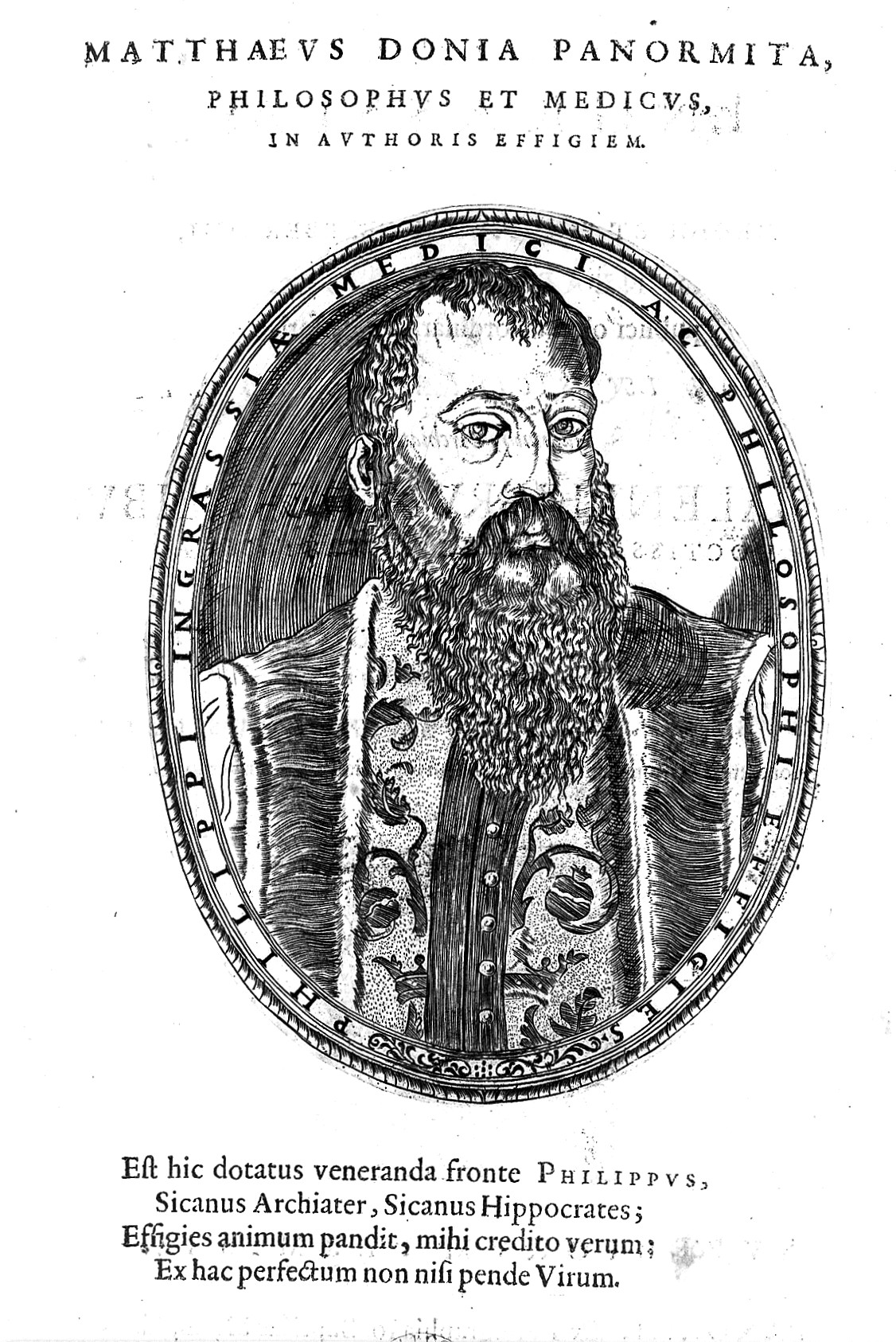
- Born: Regalbuto, Kingdom of Sicily, Crown of Aragon
- Died: Palermo, Kingdom of Sicily, Crown of Aragon
- Occupations: Surgeon, lecturer, Protomedicus of Sicily
- Known for: First known description of scarlet fever
- Medical career
- Profession: Physician
- Institutions: University of Naples
- Sub-specialties: Anatomy, epidemic response

Giovanni Filippo Ingrassia or Ioannis Philippi Ingrassiae (1510–1580) was an Italian physician, student of Falloppio, Manardo and Vesalius, professor at the University of Naples, Protomedicus of Sicily and a major figure in the history of medicine and human anatomy.

== Early life and education ==
Ingrassia was born in Regalbuto, Sicily. His family was well-educated and Ingrassia received a classical education that included the study of Latin and Greek. From 1532 to 1537, he attended the University of Padua studying under and having contacts with famous anatomists of the time, and leaving with a degree in medicine. He then worked as personal physician to nobleman near Palermo.

== University of Naples ==
In 1544 he became professor of anatomy and medicine at the University of Naples. He conducted dissection studies and recorded his findings in the book In Galeni librum de ossibus doctissima et expectatissima commentaria, a critical commentary on Galen's De Ossibus that was published posthumously in 1603. He gave the first distinct account of the true configuration of the sphenoid and the ethmoid bone as well as several other bones of the head, and has the merit of first describing (1546) the third ear bone, the stapes.

His work De tumoribus praeter naturam (1553) contains what is probably the first description of scarlet fever: he reported on a disease of children different from measles that caused a red rash all over the body, however he didn't mention the common symptom of a sore throat. The book also contains a detailed study of the penis and the mechanism of its erection. In addition, it contains a description of 163 different types of tumors.

== Palermo ==
In 1556 he was recruited to Palermo as lecturer of medicine and anatomy, working at the monastery of Saint Domenicus. The following year he was asked by the Sicilian Senate to help the government manage an outbreak of pandemic influenza that arrived in Sicily through Palermo. He proposed the a system for managing contagious fevers would aid in epidemic responses. His fame increased considerably in 1562 when he was able to heal a persistent wound of the Duke of Terranova. In 1563 he became Protomedicus (chief medical administrator) of Sicily. In this capacity, he emphasized the continuing education of physicians and insisted that medicine be treated as a scientific discipline that collected objective knowledge to ensure optimal treatments.

He established Sicily's first Board of Health and Sanitary Code.

His 1560 work Trattato assai bello et utile dei doi mostri nati in Palermo in differenti tempi contains the detailed description of two cases of Siamese twins born in Palermo.

To combat endemic malaria, he ordered the draining of surrounding swamps and instituted isolation hospitals for contagious patients.

He managed the outbreak of the plague in Sicily in 1575/1576 by ordering measures of hygiene and separating suspected, confirmed and convalescing cases in different hospital wards. In his 1576 book Informatione del pestifero, et contagioso morbo he described the disease, traced its outbreak in Sicily, and was the first to recommend public health countermeasures.

In 1578 he wrote Methodus dandi relationes pro mutilatis torquendis aut a tortura exusandi, an evaluation, from an anatomical standpoint, of the contemporary methods of torture employed by the Roman Inquisition. The work was not published until 1914.

He died in 1580 in Palermo and was buried there in the Church of San Domenico.
