= Vestibule of the ear =

Central part of the bony labyrinth

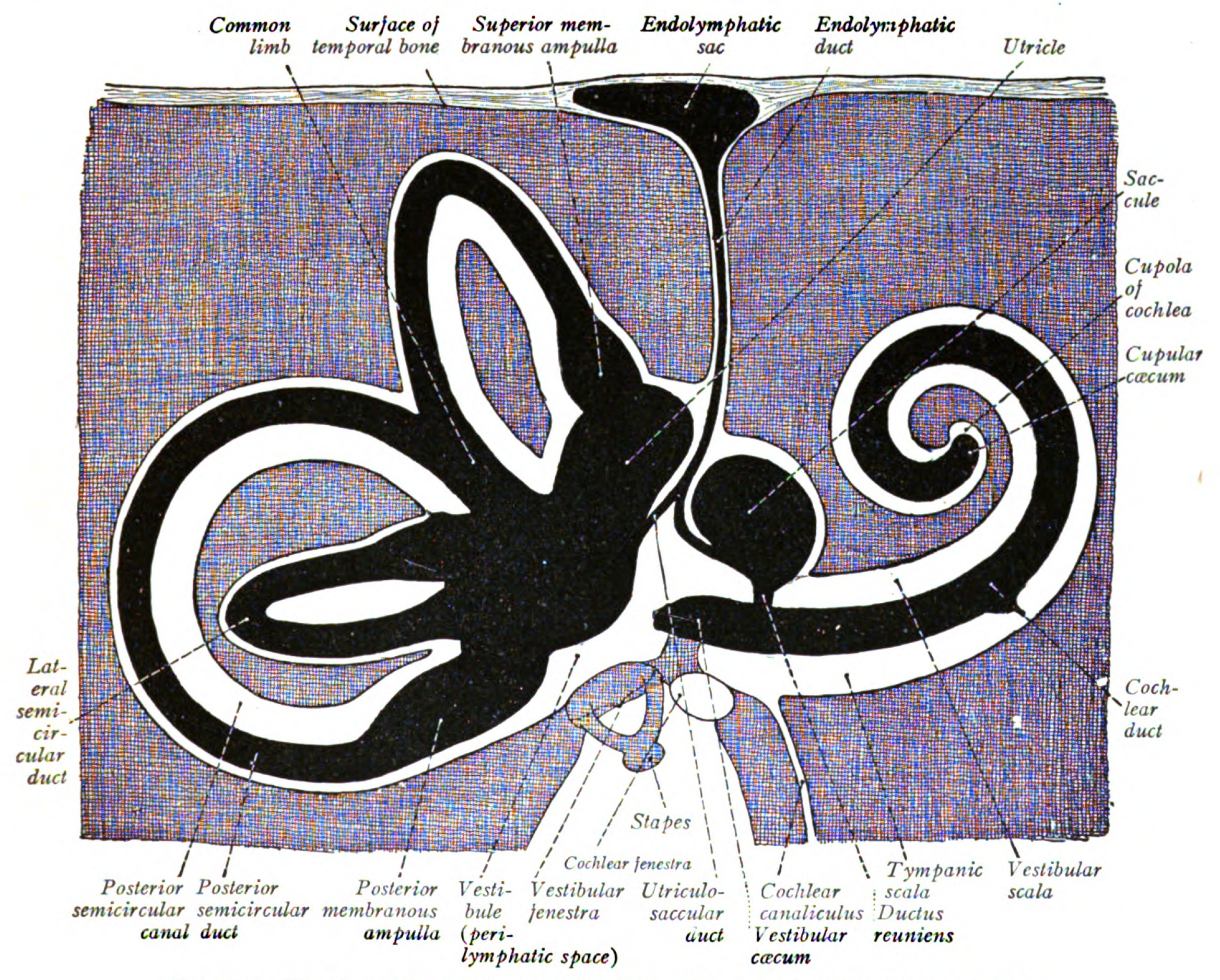
- Schematic overview of the vestibulocochlear organ, vestibule centre left.

Details
- Part of: Bony labyrinth of the inner ear

Identifiers
- Latin: vestibulum labyrinthi, vestibulum auris
- MeSH: D014722
- TA98: A15.3.03.004
- TA2: 6942
- FMA: 60183

The vestibule is the central part of the bony labyrinth in the inner ear, and is situated medial to the eardrum, behind the cochlea, and in front of the three semicircular canals.

The name comes from the Latin vestibulum, literally an entrance hall.

== Structure ==
The vestibule is somewhat oval in shape, but flattened transversely; it measures about 5 mm from front to back, the same from top to bottom, and about 3 mm across.

In its lateral or tympanic wall is the oval window, closed, in the fresh state, by the base of the stapes and annular ligament.

On its medial wall, at the forepart, is a small circular depression, the recessus sphæricus, which is perforated, at its anterior and inferior part, by several minute holes (macula cribrosa media) for the passage of filaments of the acoustic nerve to the saccule; and behind this depression is an oblique ridge, the crista vestibuli, the anterior end of which is named the pyramid of the vestibule.

This ridge bifurcates below to enclose a small depression, the fossa cochlearis, which is perforated by a number of holes for the passage of filaments of the acoustic nerve which supply the vestibular end of the cochlear duct.

The orifice of the vestibular aqueduct is the hind part of the medial wall; it extends to the posterior surface of the petrous portion of the temporal bone.

It transmits a small vein and contains a tubular prolongation of the membranous labyrinth, the endolymphatic duct, which ends in a cul-de-sac between the layers of the dura mater within the cranial cavity.

On the upper wall or roof, there is a transversely oval depression, the recessus ellipticus, separated from the recessus sphæricus by the crista vestibuli already mentioned.

The pyramid and adjoining part of the recessus ellipticus are perforated by a number of holes (macula cribrosa superior).

The apertures in the pyramid transmit the nerves to the utricle; those in the recessus ellipticus are the nerves to the ampullæ of the superior and lateral semicircular ducts.

Behind, the five orifices of the semicircular canals can be found.

In the frontal view, there is an elliptical opening which communicates with the vestibular duct of the cochlea.

== Additional images ==
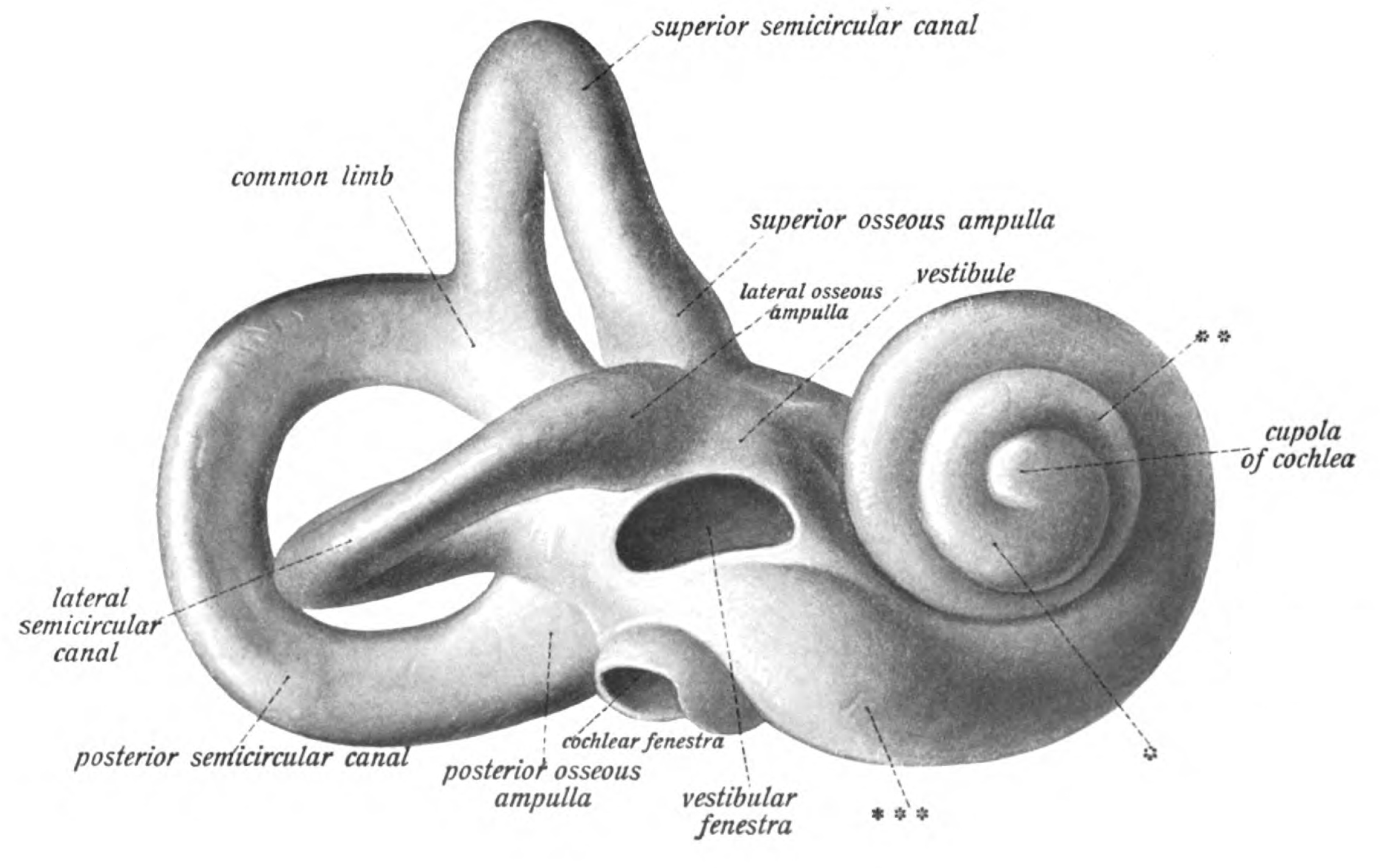
Right osseous labyrinth (lateral view).

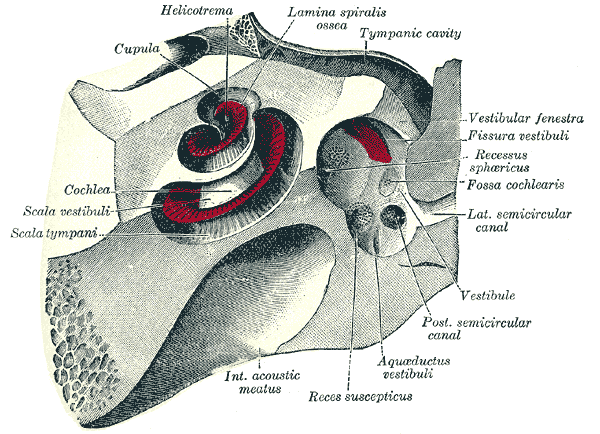
The cochlea and vestibule (view from above).

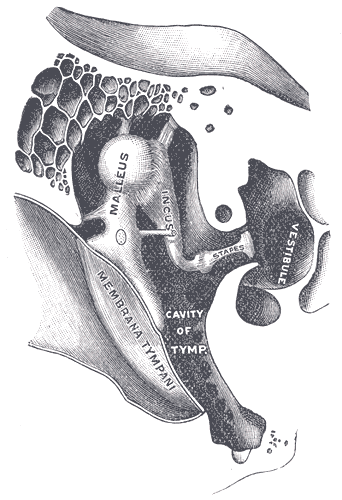
Chain of ossicles and their ligaments, seen from the front in a vertical, transverse section of the tympanum. (Vestibule visible at center right.)

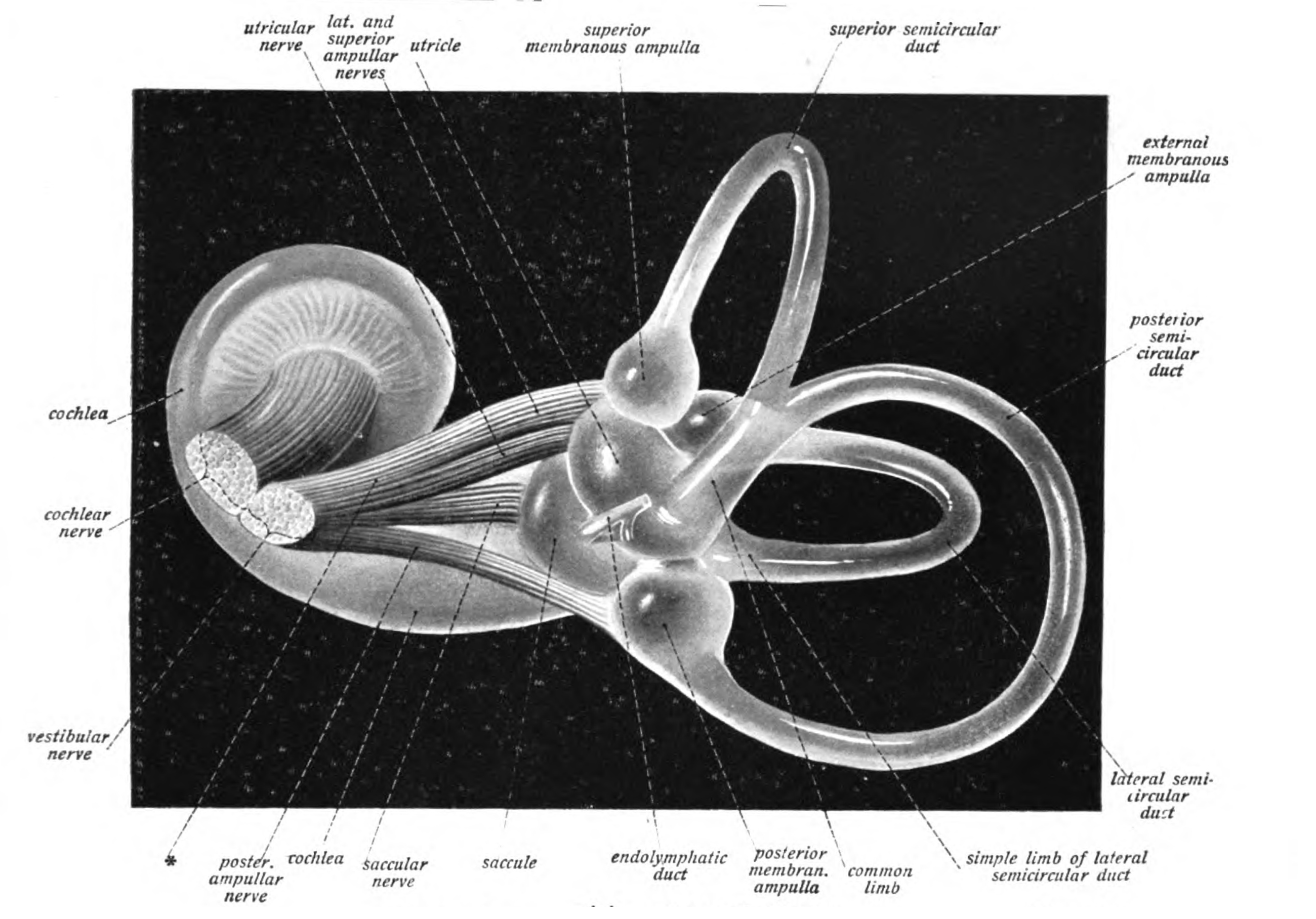
Internal liquid structures of the cochlea and semicircular ducts, vestibule at centre.

== See also ==
- Vestibular system
