= Otic vesicle =

Structure of the developing embryo

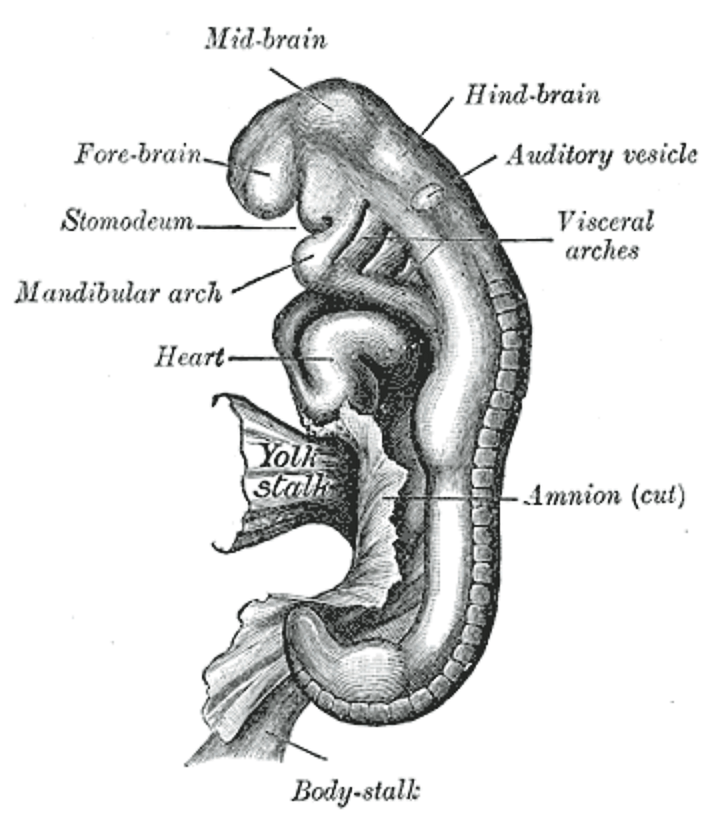
- Embryo between eighteen and twenty-one days

- General formation of the otic vesicle

Details
- Precursor: Otic placode, auditory pit or otic pit, otic cup,
- Gives rise to: Membranous labyrinth of the inner ear

Identifiers
- Latin: vesicula otica
- TE: vesicle_by_E5.15.1.0.0.0.4 E5.15.1.0.0.0.4

Otic vesicle, or auditory vesicle, consists of either of the two sac-like invaginations formed and subsequently closed off during embryonic development. It is part of the neural ectoderm, which will develop into the membranous labyrinth of the inner ear. This labyrinth is a continuous epithelium, giving rise to the vestibular system and auditory components of the inner ear. During the earlier stages of embryogenesis, the otic placode invaginates to produce the otic cup. Thereafter, the otic cup closes off, creating the otic vesicle. Once formed, the otic vesicle will reside next to the neural tube medially, and on the lateral side will be paraxial mesoderm. Neural crest cells will migrate rostral and caudal to the placode.

The general sequence in formation of the otic vesicle is relatively conserved across vertebrates, although there is much variation in timing and stages. Patterning during morphogenesis into the distinctive inner ear structures is determined by homeobox transcription factors including PAX2, DLX5 and DLX6, with the former specifying for ventral otic vesicle derived auditory structures and the latter two specifying for dorsal vestibular structures.

== Development ==
The otic vesicle is derived from the cranial placode. The early otic vesicle is characterized as having broad competence and can be subdivided into sensory, non-sensory, and neurogenic components. Sensory epithelial cells and neurons are derived from the proneurosensory domain. This domain can be further sub-categorized into the neurogenic sub-domain and prosensory sub-domain. Prosensory sub-domain eventually gives rise to the support cells and hair cells while the neurogenic sub-domain gives rise to the auditory neuron and vestibular neuron.

The middle part of the otic vesicle develops into the ductus and saccus endolymphaticus. The anterior end of the otic vesicle gradually elongates as a tube and coils upon itself forming the beginnings of the cochlear duct. The vestibular extremity subsequently constricts to form the canalis reuniens. The central part of the otic vesicle represents the membranous vestibule, and is subdivided by a constriction into a smaller ventral part, the saccule, and a larger dorsal and posterior part, the utricle. The dorsal component of the inner ear also consists of what will become the semicircular canals. The utricle and saccule communicate with each other by means of a Y-shaped canal.

=== Gene signaling ===
The FGF, Bmp, Wnt and Pax genes are likely to be involved in otic induction. FGF and BMP signals help control patterning in the early otic vesicle. Fgf3 and Fgf10 are suggested to play a role in otic induction in mice, as were Msx genes suggested to play a role in otic vesicle formation in chicks. Pax8 is expressed during the entirety of otic vesicle formation. Other genes found in the otic vesicle across species that may play a role in patterning include Hmx, Fox, Dlx, and Gbx genes.

== Other animals ==
Formation of the otic vesicle has been studied extensively in developmental model organisms including chicken, Xenopus, zebrafish, axolotl, and mouse. The transition from the otic placode to the otic vesicle occurs during the 19th somite stage in zebrafish, Xenopus, and the chick. In the chick, invagination of the otic placode occurs passively due to the movements of the surrounding placode. The otic placode in zebrafish, on the other hand, occurs by cavitation; the ectodermal placode condenses and forms an ovoid ball directly below the embryo surface. Otic vesicle formation occurs later, during the 25-30 somite stage in mice.

== Additional images ==
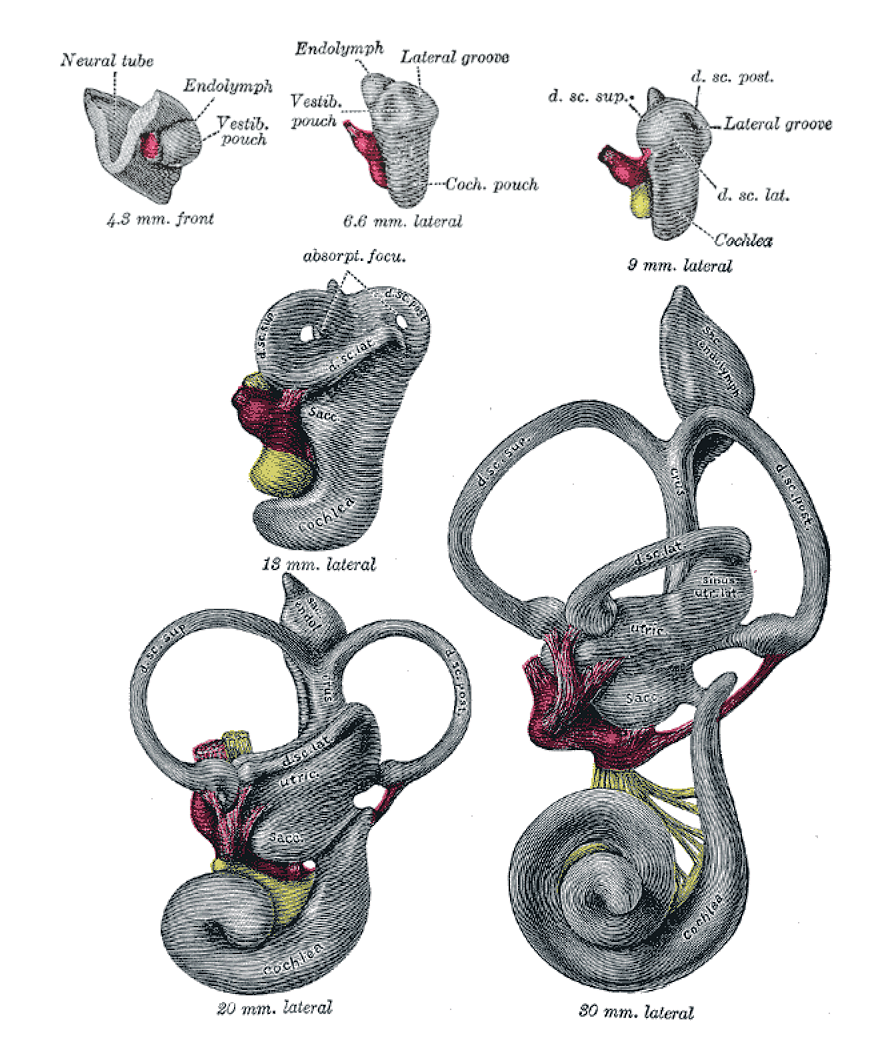
Lateral views of membranous labyrinth and acoustic complex. X 25 dia.

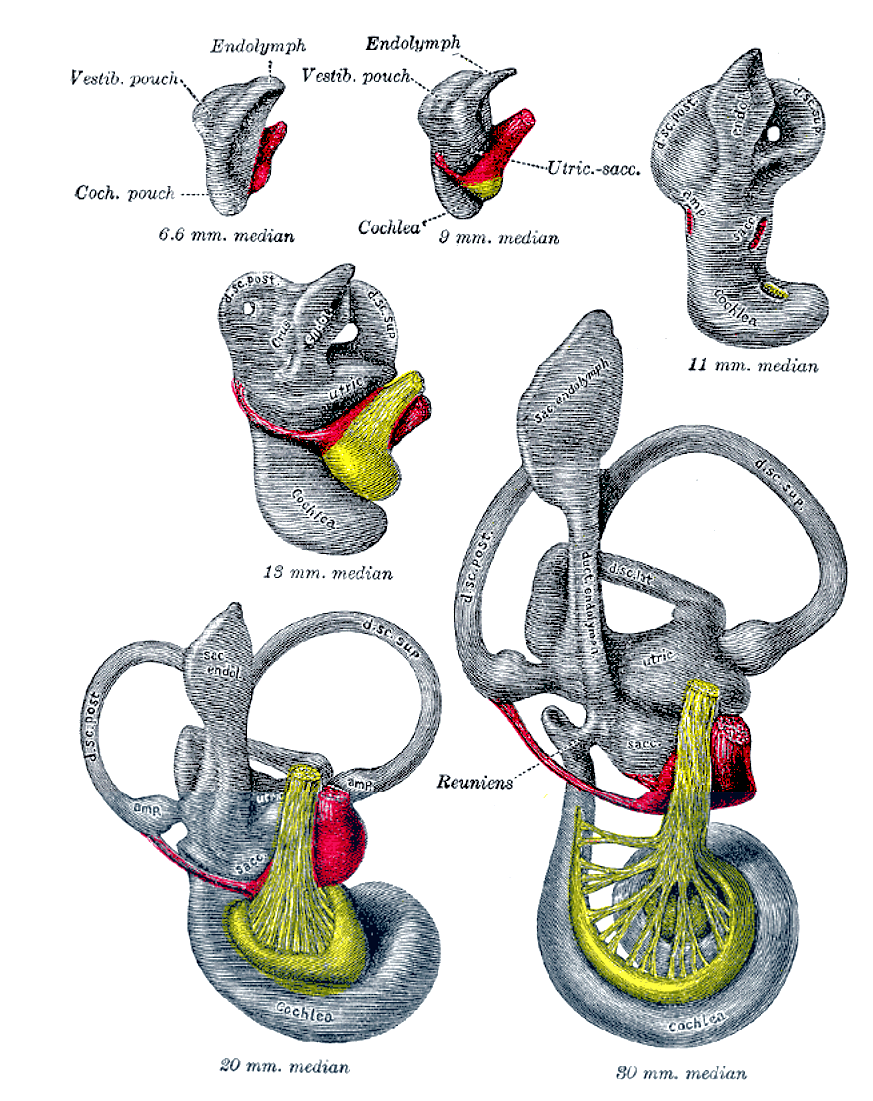
Median views of membranous labyrinth and acoustic complex in human embryos. X 25 dia.
