= Round window =

Opening in the ear

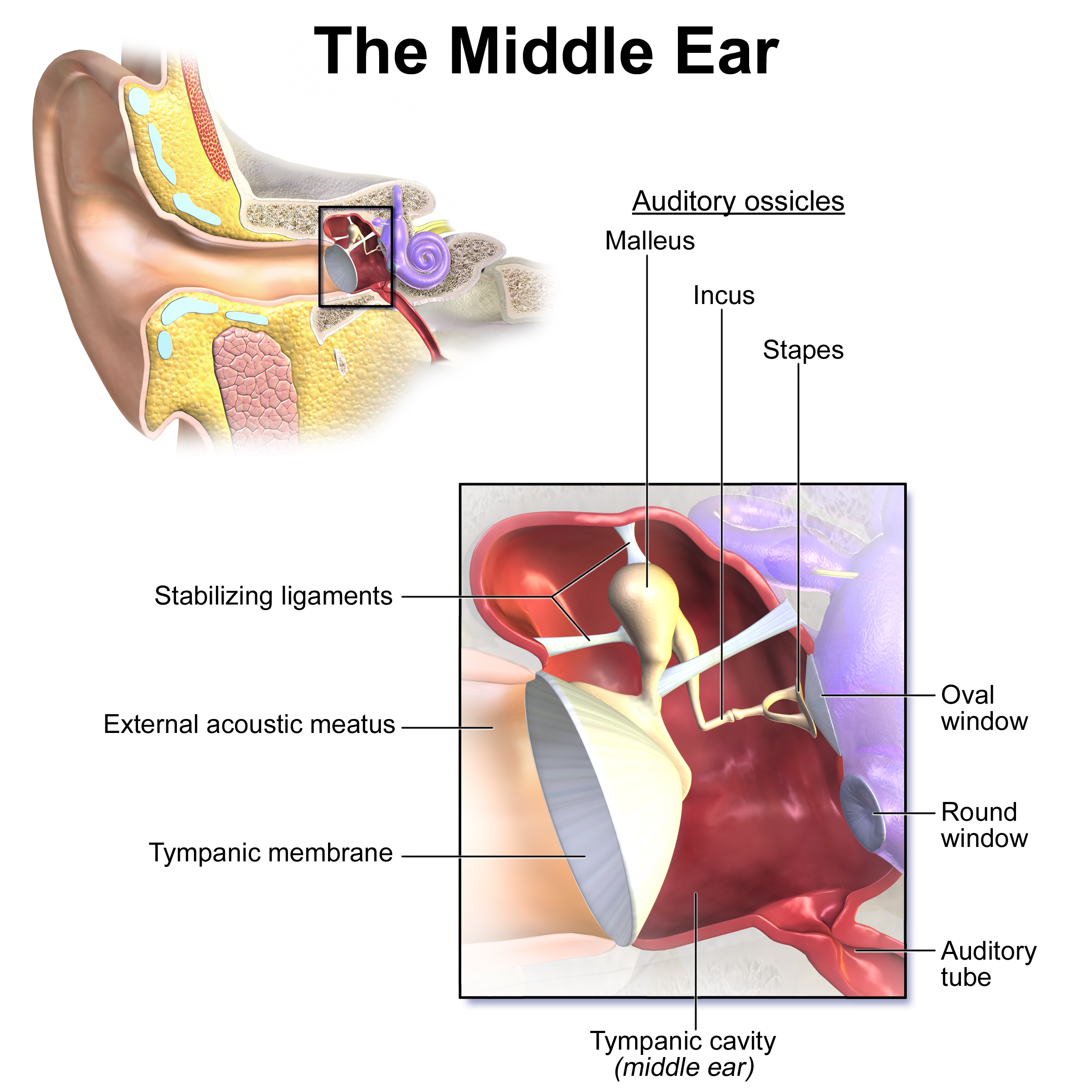
- Middle ear, with round window at right.

- Interior of right osseous labyrinth (label is cochlear fenestra, at bottom center)

Details

Identifiers
- Latin: fenestra cochleae, fenestra rotunda
- MeSH: D012405
- TA98: A15.3.02.015
- TA2: 6904
- FMA: 56932

The round window is one of the two openings from the middle ear into the inner ear. It is sealed by the secondary tympanic membrane (round window membrane), which vibrates with opposite phase to vibrations entering the inner ear through the oval window. It allows fluid in the cochlea to move, which in turn ensures that hair cells of the basilar membrane will be stimulated and that audition will occur.

== Structure ==
The round window is situated below (inferior to) and a little behind (posterior to) the oval window, from which it is separated by a rounded elevation, the promontory.

It is located at the bottom of a funnel-shaped depression (the round window niche) and, in the macerated bone, opens into the cochlea of the internal ear; in the fresh state it is closed by a membrane, the secondary tympanic membrane (Latin: membrana tympani secundaria, or membrana fenestrae cochleae) or round window membrane, which is a complex saddle point shape. The visible central portion is concave (curved inwards) toward the tympanic cavity and convex (curved outwards) toward the cochlea; but towards the edges, where it is hidden in the round window niche, it curves the other way.

This membrane consists of three layers:

- an external, or mucous, derived from the mucous lining of the tympanic cavity;
- an internal, from the lining membrane of the cochlea;
- and an intermediate, or fibrous layer.

The membrane vibrates with opposite phase to vibrations entering the cochlea through the oval window as the fluid in the cochlea is displaced when pressed by the stapes at the oval window. This ensures that hair cells of the basilar membrane will be stimulated and that audition will occur.

Both the oval and round windows are about the same size, approximately 2.5 square millimetres (0.0039 sq in). The entrance to the round window niche is often much smaller than this.

== Function ==
The stapes bone transmits movement to the oval window. As the stapes footplate moves into the oval window, the round window membrane moves out, and this allows movement of the fluid within the cochlea, leading to movement of the cochlear inner hair cells and thus hearing. If the round window were to be absent or rigidly fixed (as can happen in some congenital abnormalities), the stapes footplate would be pushing incompressible fluid against the unyielding walls of the cochlea. It would therefore not move to any useful degree leading to a hearing loss of about 60 dB. This is, unsurprisingly, the same as for conditions where the stapes itself is fixed, such as otosclerosis.

== Imaging ==
The round window is located within the mesotympanum, at the posterior extremity of the basal turn of the cochlea. The oval windows is also located within the mesotympanum, opening at the inferior and lateral part of the vestibule. Both can be seen readily on CT.

== Clinical significance ==
The round window sometimes fails to develop correctly and causes the hearing loss mentioned above. Unfortunately round window malformations are often associated with other ear malformations and the hearing loss can be much more severe. Some types of ear surgery (now generally abandoned) used to leave the round window open to the outside world and covered over the oval window. Sound pressure therefore hit the round window but was shielded from the oval window. It therefore travelled "backwards" around the cochlea but still gave useful hearing as the hair cells were still deflected in the same way. The round window is often used as an approach for cochlear implant surgery. It has also recently been used as a site to place middle ear implantable hearing aid transducers. This work has been publicised by Prof. Vittorio Colletti in Verona.

== Additional images ==
Cochlea

== See also ==
- Oval window
