= Otic placode =

Feature of a developing embryo from which the ear develops

Details
- Precursor: Ectoderm
- Gives rise to: Ear

Identifiers
- Latin: placoda otica
- TE: placode_by_E5.15.2.0.0.0.4 E5.15.2.0.0.0.4

In embryology, the otic placode is a thickening of the ectoderm on the outer surface of a developing embryo from which the ear develops. The ear, including both the vestibular system and the auditory system, develops from the otic placode beginning the third week of development. During the fourth week, the otic placode invaginates into the mesenchyme adjacent to the rhombencephalon to form the otic pit, which then pinches off from the surface ectoderm to form the otic vesicle.

== See also ==
- Placode
