= Annular ligament of stapes =

Ligament of the middle and inner ear

Annular stapedial ligament

Details
- From: Stapes
- To: Oval window

Identifiers
- Latin: ligamentum anulare stapedis
- TA98: A15.3.02.060
- TA2: 1645
- FMA: 60884

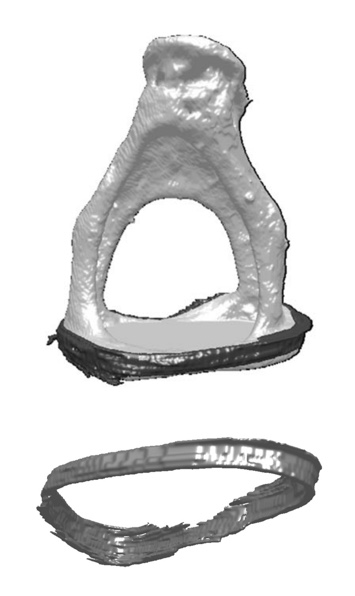

The annular stapedial ligament (also called the stapediovestibular joint) is a ring of fibrous soft tissue that connects the base of the stapes to the oval window of the inner ear.

Calcification and hardening of the annular ligament of the stapes (otosclerosis) is a common cause of adult deafness.
