= Otic pit =

Part of the human body

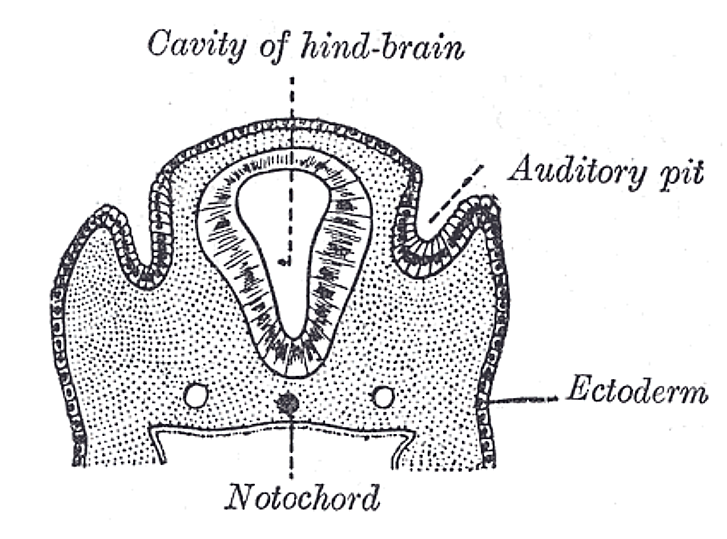
- Section through the head of a human embryo, at the beginning of the fourth week, in the region of the hind-brain.

Details
- Precursor: Auditory plate

Identifiers
- Latin: fovea otica
- TE: pit_by_E5.15.2.0.0.0.5 E5.15.2.0.0.0.5

The auditory pit, also known as the otic pit, is the first rudiment of the internal ear. It appears shortly after that of the eye, in the form of a patch of thickened ectoderm, the auditory plate, over the region of the hindbrain. The auditory plate becomes depressed and converted into the auditory pit (or otic pit).
