= Oval window =

Membrane-covered opening in the ear

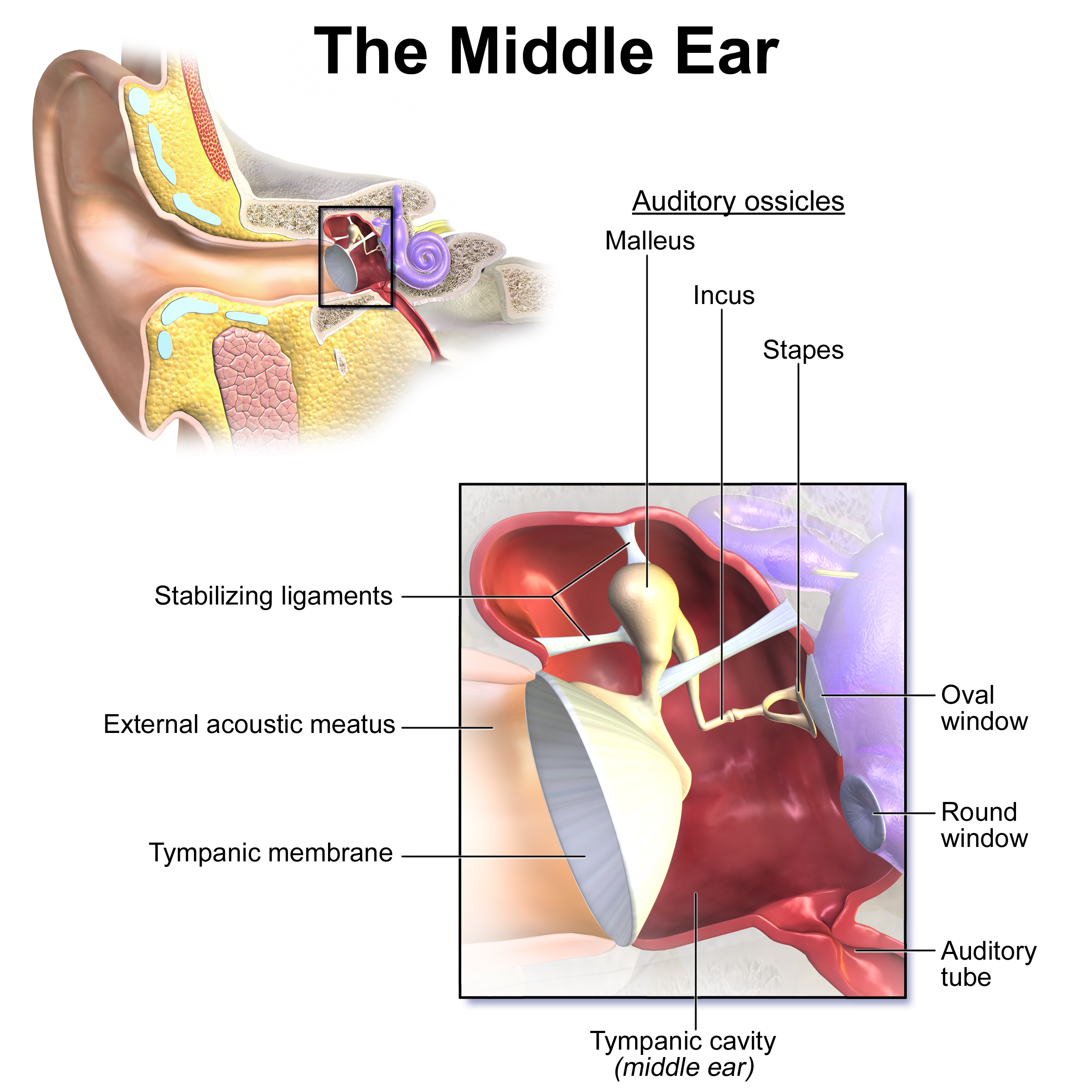
- Middle ear, with oval window at right.

- Right osseous labyrinth. Lateral view (label is vestibular fenestra — black circle near center)

Details

Identifiers
- Latin: fenestra vestibuli, fenestra ovalis
- MeSH: D010046
- TA98: A15.3.02.009
- TA2: 6897
- FMA: 56913

The oval window (or fenestra vestibuli or fenestra ovalis) is a connective tissue membrane-covered opening from the middle ear to the cochlea of the inner ear.

Vibrations that contact the tympanic membrane travel through the three ossicles and into the inner ear. The oval window is the intersection of the middle ear with the inner ear, and is directly contacted by the stapes. By the time vibrations reach the oval window, they have been reduced in amplitude and increased in pressure due to the lever action of the ossicle bones. This is not an amplification function; rather, an impedance-matching function, allowing sound to be transferred from air (outer ear) to liquid (cochlea).

It is a reniform (kidney-shaped) opening leading from the tympanic cavity into the vestibule of the inner ear; its long diameter is horizontal and its convex border is upward. It is occupied by the base of the stapes, the circumference of which is fixed by the annular ligament to the margin of the foramen.

== Additional images ==
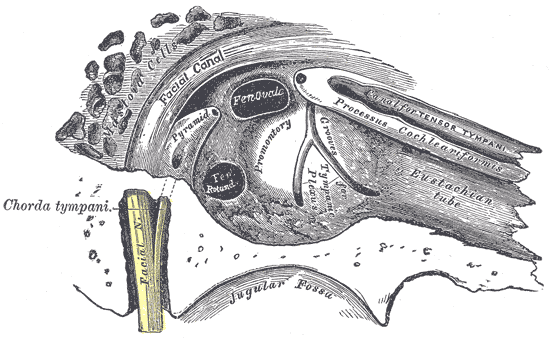
View of the inner wall of the eardrum (label is fen. oval. – black circle near top)

Cochlea

== See also ==
- Round window
