= Stapes =

Bone of the middle ear

- Frontal view of stapes (A), and view from below (B).

Details
- Pronunciation: /ˈsteɪpiːz/
- Precursor: Second branchial arch
- Part of: Middle ear
- System: Auditory system
- Articulations: Incudostapedial joint

Identifiers
- Latin: stapes
- MeSH: D013199
- TA98: A15.3.02.033
- TA2: 895
- FMA: 52751

The stapes or stirrup is a bone in the middle ear of humans and other tetrapods which is involved in the conduction of sound vibrations to the inner ear. This bone is connected to the oval window by its annular ligament, which allows the footplate (or base) to transmit sound energy through the oval window into the inner ear. The stapes is the smallest and lightest bone in the human body, and is so called because of its resemblance to a stirrup (Latin: stapes).

== Structure ==
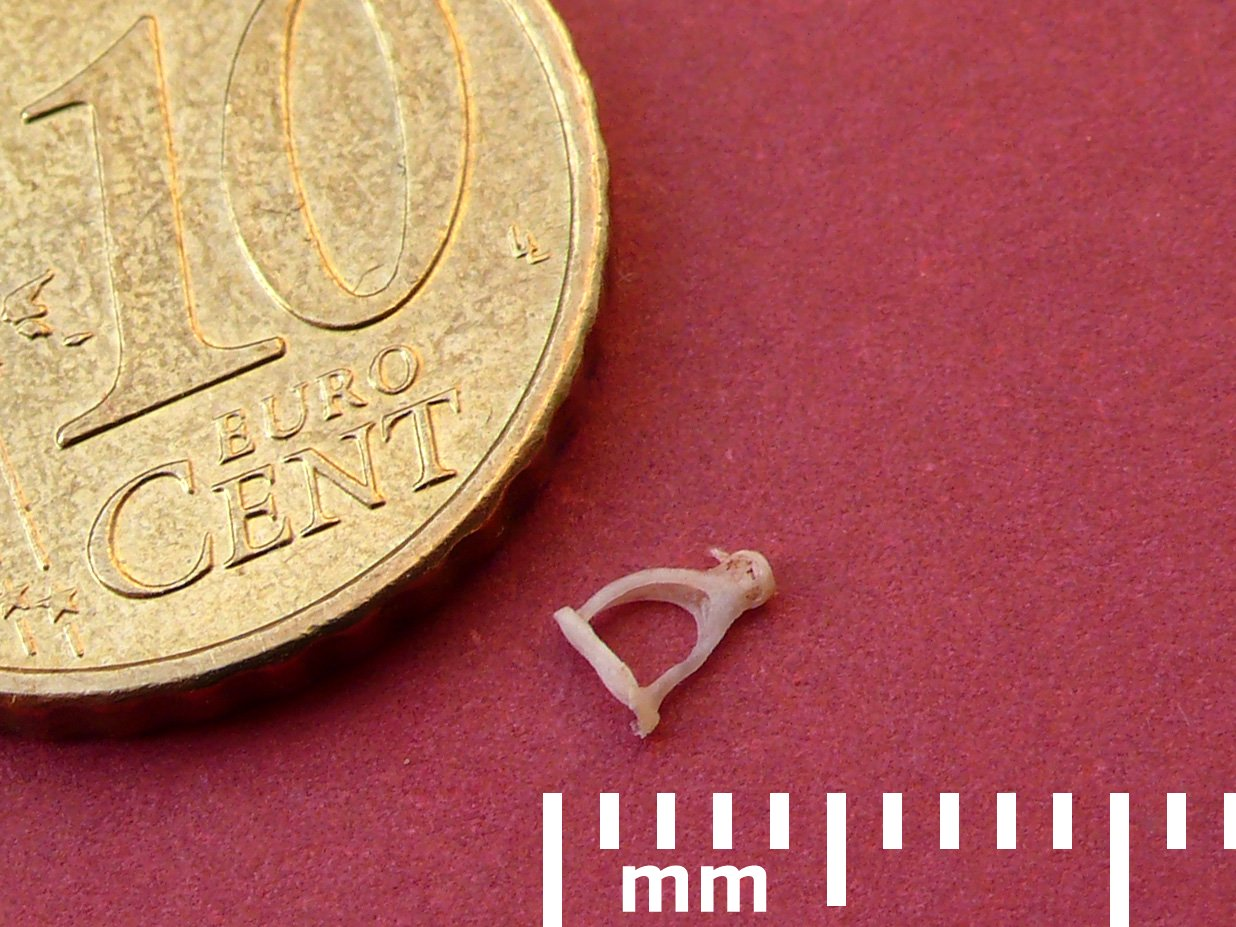
The size of the stapes, compared with a 10-cent euro coin.

The stapes is the third bone of the three ossicles in the middle ear and the smallest in the human body. It measures roughly 2 to 3 mm, greater along the head-base span. It rests on the oval window, to which it is connected by an annular ligament and articulates with the incus, or anvil through the incudostapedial joint. They are connected by anterior and posterior limbs (Latin: crura).

=== Development ===
The stapes develops from the second pharyngeal arch during the sixth to eighth week of embryological development in humans. The central cavity of the stapes, the obturator foramen, is due to the presence embryologically of the stapedial artery, which usually regresses in humans during normal development.

=== Animals ===
The stapes is one of three ossicles in mammals. In non-mammalian tetrapods, the bone homologous to the stapes is usually called the columella; however, in reptiles, either term may be used. In fish, the homologous bone is called the hyomandibular, and is part of the gill arch supporting either the spiracle or the jaw, depending on the species. The equivalent term in amphibians is the pars media plectra.

=== Variation ===
The stapes appears to be relatively constant in size in different ethnic groups. In 0.01–0.02% of people, the stapedial artery does not regress, and persists in the central foramen. In this case, a pulsatile sound may be heard in the affected ear, or there may be no symptoms at all. Rarely, the stapes may be completely absent.

== Function ==
Situated between the incus and the inner ear, the stapes transmits sound vibrations from the incus to the oval window, a membrane-covered opening to the inner ear. The stapes is also stabilized by the stapedius muscle, which is innervated by the facial nerve.

== Clinical relevance ==
Otosclerosis is a congenital or spontaneous-onset disease characterized by abnormal bone remodeling in the inner ear. Often this causes the stapes to adhere to the oval window, which impedes its ability to conduct sound, and is a cause of conductive hearing loss. Clinical otosclerosis is found in about 1% of people, although it is more common in forms that do not cause noticeable hearing loss. Otosclerosis is more likely in young age groups, and females. Two common treatments are stapedectomy, the surgical removal of the stapes and replacement with an artificial prosthesis, and stapedotomy, the creation of a small hole in the base of the stapes followed by the insertion of an artificial prosthesis into that hole. Surgery may be complicated by a persistent stapedial artery, fibrosis-related damage to the base of the bone, or obliterative otosclerosis, resulting in obliteration of the base.

== History ==
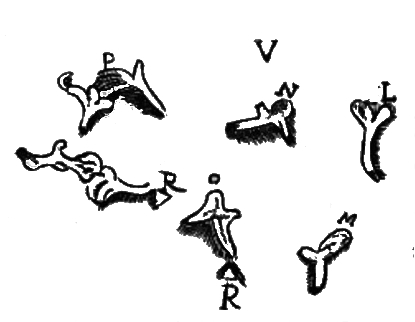
The stapes, as first described by Giovanni Filippo Ingrassia (Labeled M, bottom right).

The stapes is commonly described as having been discovered by the professor Giovanni Filippo Ingrassia in 1546 at the University of Naples, although this remains the nature of some controversy, as Ingrassia's description was published posthumously in his 1603 anatomical commentary In Galeni librum de ossibus doctissima et expectatissima commentaria. Spanish anatomist Pedro Jimeno is first to have been credited with a published description, in Dialogus de re medica (1549). The word stapes means "stirrup" in Medieval Latin. Classical Latin lacked an equivalent word, since stirrups did not exist in the ancient world.
