= Incudomalleolar joint =

Synovial joint between malleus and incus

Incudomallear joint

Details

Identifiers
- Latin: Articulatio incudomallearis
- TA98: A15.3.02.050
- TA2: 1647
- FMA: 60064

The incudomalleolar joint (also called incudomallear joint, or malleoincudal joint) or articulatio incudomallearis is a small saddle-type synovial joint between the malleus (hammer) and the incus (anvil). The joint's function is to transfer vibrations between the ossicles in the middle ear, which is perceived as sound. It may also play a role in protecting the inner ear during changes in static air pressure. Contrary to other synovial joints the movement is very limited. All of the ossicles move more or less as a unit, at least at low frequencies.

When the eardrum is moved inward due to sound vibrations, transferred through the outer ear, it transmits to the handle or manubrium of the malleus which is connected to the ear drum. The head of the malleus (caput mallei) moves with it and transfers energy/movement to the corpus of the incus (corpus incudis), which is located directly behind. The sound vibrations are then transferred to the stapes (stirrup) through the incudostapedial joint.

== See also ==
- Incudostapedial joint – Small joint between the incus and the stapes
