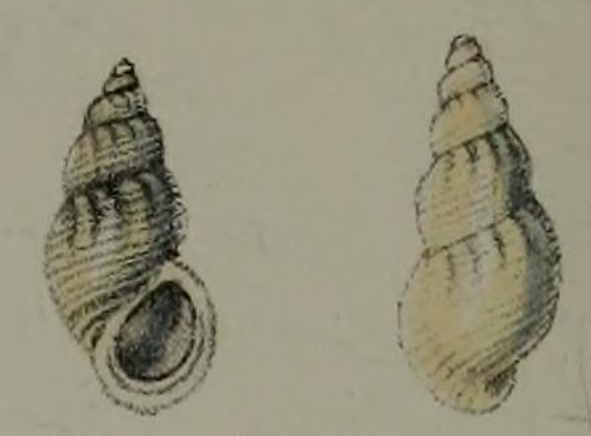
- Drawing of a shell of Alvania aurantiaca (holotype)

Scientific classification
- Kingdom: Animalia
- Phylum: Mollusca
- Class: Gastropoda
- Subclass: Caenogastropoda
- Order: Littorinimorpha
- Superfamily: Rissooidea
- Family: Rissoidae
- Genus: Alvania
- Species: A. aurantiaca

Binomial name
- Alvania aurantiaca (Watson, 1873)

Synonyms
- Alvania gomezi Rolán, 1987 (synonym); Rissoa aurantiaca R. B. Watson, 1873

= Alvania aurantiaca =

Species of gastropod

Alvania aurantiaca is a species of small sea snail, a marine gastropod mollusk or micromollusk in the family Rissoidae.

== Description ==
(Original description) The oblong shell is thick, not transparent, a little glossy, tubercled and rises in steps.

Sculpture The sculpture of the shell shows longitudinal ribs, 18 to 20 on the body whorl, gently rounded and disappearing on base. They are diminishing in number upwards on the whorls, and absent on the embryonic whorl. Each is about twice as broad as the interval between them. There are 12 to 13 spiral threads. These are raised, rounded and shining. Those on the upper part of the body whorl are thrown out by the ribs into sharp points. They are generally pretty equally parted by spirally scratched interstices a little broader than themselves. On the base they are sometimes closer-set, and sometimes are followed by a kind of miniature of themselves occupying half the interstice. The spiral scratchings of the interstices are extremely minute. And though more distinct than in Alvania moniziana, they do not interfere with the gloss of the surface as they do in Rissoa crispa. About six go to each interstice. There is a broad, thick, white labial rib, which is strongly scored across by the spiral threads. And between these the interstitial scratches are plainly shown. But all these disappear just short of the aperture, which is edged by a thin and narrow border in advance of the labial rib. This border is well scored longitudinally.

The colour is orange (whence the name), with a slight dash of brown, in some cases paler, in others darker, but with little variety, and quite uniform in each specimen, except that sometimes, though rarely, the first whorl has a shade more of brown. The labial rib is whiter than the rest of the shell.

The spire is long, very little contracted upwards, rising but slightly in steps, ending in a depressed round apex, which is always higher on the side where the extreme embryonic tip stands up.

The shell contains 4 to 8 whorls, fully rounded, of regular increase. The suture is deep and little oblique. The aperture is very round, obtusely pointed above and encroached on by the belly. It is not open, except a little in front and on the columella. The outer lip is much thickened by the labial rib, but on its extreme edge sharp and thin, slightly expanding below. Its exterior profile, as the shell lies on its back, is formed by the labial rib bearing as knobs the ends of the spiral threads. The inner lip consists of the projecting edge of the outer lip, which sweeps continuously round. On the columella it is a little reflected, and has there a sharp but little-projecting edge, with an umbilical chink behind it. This chink is generally small and narrow, but is sometimes open and trough-like. The callus which carries the columellar lip across the belly is thin and closely united to the body. At its junction with the outer lip it seems always, in well-grown specimens, to project a little way out from the body to meet that lip.

== Distribution ==
This species occurs in the Atlantic Ocean off Madeira.
