= Ligament of incus =

Ligament of incus may refer to:

- Superior ligament of incus, a fibrous band that crosses from the body of the incus to the roof of the tympanic cavity
- Posterior ligament of incus, a fibrous band that connects the tip of the short crus of the incus to the fossa incudis
