= Otosclerosis =

Abnormal ossification in the middle ear

- Other names: Otospongiosis
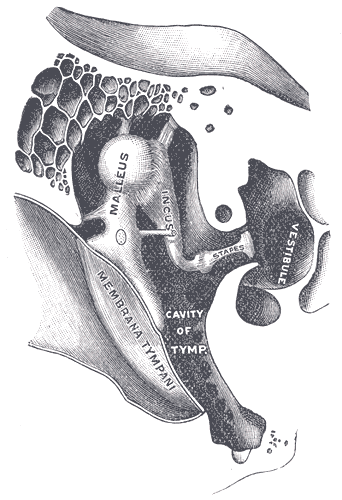
- Chain of ossicles and their ligaments. (Stapes visible near center right.)
- Specialty: Otorhinolaryngology

Otosclerosis is a condition of the middle and inner ear where portions of the dense enchondral layer of the bony labyrinth remodel into one or more lesions of irregularly-laid spongy bone. As the lesions reach the stapes the bone is resorbed, then hardened (sclerotized), which limits its movement and results in hearing loss, tinnitus, vertigo or a combination of these. The term otosclerosis is something of a misnomer: much of the clinical course is characterized by lucent rather than sclerotic bony changes, so the disease is also known as otospongiosis.

== Etymology ==
The word otosclerosis derives from Greek ὠτός (ōtos), genitive of οὖς (oûs) "ear" + σκλήρωσις (sklērōsis), "hardening".

== Presentation ==
The primary form of hearing loss in otosclerosis is conductive hearing loss (CHL) whereby sounds reach the ear drum but are incompletely transferred via the ossicular chain in the middle ear, and thus partly fail to reach the inner ear (cochlea). This can affect one ear or both ears. On audiometry, the hearing loss is characteristically low-frequency, with higher frequencies being affected later.

Sensorineural hearing loss (SNHL) has also been noted in patients with otosclerosis; this is usually a high-frequency loss, and usually manifests late in the disease. The causal link between otosclerosis and SNHL remains controversial. Over the past century, leading otologists and neurotologic researchers have argued whether the finding of SNHL late in the course of otosclerosis is due to otosclerosis or simply to typical presbycusis.

Most patients with otosclerosis notice tinnitus (head noise) to some degree. The amount of tinnitus is not necessarily related to the degree or type of hearing impairment. Tinnitus develops due to irritation of the delicate nerve endings in the inner ear. Since the nerve carries sound, this irritation is manifested as ringing, roaring or buzzing. It is usually worse when the patient is fatigued, nervous or in a quiet environment.

== Causes ==
Otosclerosis can be caused by both genetic and environmental factors, such as a viral infection (like measles). Ribonucleic acid of the measles virus has been found in the stapes footplate of most patients with otosclerosis. Populations that have been vaccinated against measles had a significant reduction in otosclerosis. While the disease is considered to be hereditary, its penetrance and the degree of expression is so highly variable that it may be difficult to detect an inheritance pattern. Most of the implicated genes are transmitted in an autosomal dominant fashion. One genome-wide analysis associates otosclerosis with variation in the RELN gene.

Loci include:

Name	OMIM	Locus
OTSC1	166800	15q26.1
OTSC2	605727	7q
OTSC3	608244	6p
OTSC4	611571	16q
OTSC5	608787	3q22-q24
OTSC7	611572	6q13
OTSC8	612096	9p13.1-q21.11

== Pathophysiology ==
The pathophysiology of otosclerosis is complex. The key lesions of otosclerosis are multifocal areas of sclerosis within the endochondral temporal bone. These lesions share some characteristics with Paget's Disease, but they are not thought to be otherwise related. Histopathological studies have all been done on cadaveric temporal bones, so only inferences can be made about progression of the disease histologically. It seems that the lesions go through an active "spongiotic" or hypervascular phase before developing into "sclerotic" phase lesions. There have been many genes and proteins identified that, when mutated, may lead to these lesions. Also there is mounting evidence that measles virus is present within the otosclerotic foci, implicating an infectious etiology (this has also been noted in Paget's Disease).

Conductive hearing loss (CHL) in otosclerosis is caused by two main sites of involvement of the sclerotic (or scar-like) lesions. The best understood mechanism is fixation of the stapes footplate to the oval window of the cochlea. This greatly impairs movement of the stapes and therefore transmission of sound into the inner ear ("ossicular coupling"). Additionally the cochlea's round window can also become sclerotic, and in a similar way impair movement of sound pressure waves through the inner ear ("acoustic coupling").

CHL is usually concomitant with impingement of abnormal bone on the stapes footplate. This involvement of the oval window forms the basis of the name fenestral otosclerosis. The most common location of involvement of otosclerosis is the bone just anterior to the oval window at a small cleft known as the fissula ante fenestram. The fissula is a thin fold of connective tissue extending through the endochondral layer, approximately between the oval window and the cochleariform process, where the tensor tympani tendon turns laterally toward the malleus.

The mechanism of sensorineural hearing loss in otosclerosis is less well understood. It may result from direct injury to the cochlea and spiral ligament from the lytic process or from release of proteolytic enzymes into the cochlea. There are certainly a few well documented instances of sclerotic lesions directly obliterating sensory structures within the cochlea and spiral ligament, which have been photographed and reported post-mortem. Other supporting data includes a consistent loss of cochlear hair cells in patients with otosclerosis; these cells being the chief sensory organs of sound reception. A suggested mechanism for this is the release of hydrolytic enzymes into the inner ear structures by the spongiotic lesions.

== Diagnosis ==
Otosclerosis is traditionally diagnosed by characteristic clinical findings, which include progressive conductive hearing loss, a normal tympanic membrane, and no evidence of middle ear inflammation. The cochlear promontory may have a faint pink tinge reflecting the vascularity of the lesion, referred to as the Schwartz sign.

Approximately 0.5% of the population will eventually be diagnosed with otosclerosis. Post-mortem studies show that as many as 10% of people may have otosclerotic lesions of their temporal bone, but apparently never had symptoms warranting a diagnosis. Caucasians are the most affected race, with the prevalence in the Black and Asian populations being much lower. In clinical practice otosclerosis is encountered about twice as frequently in females as in males, but this does not reflect the true sex ratio. When families are investigated it is found that the condition is only slightly more common in women. Usually noticeable hearing loss begins at middle-age, but can start much sooner. The hearing loss was long believed to grow worse during pregnancy, but recent research does not support this belief.

=== Audiometry ===
Fixation of the stapes within the oval window causes a conductive hearing loss. In pure-tone audiometry, this manifests as air-bone gaps on the audiogram (i.e. a difference of more than 10 dB between the air-conduction and bone-conduction thresholds at a given test frequency). However, medial fixation of the ossicular chain impairs both the inertial and osseotympanic modes of bone conduction, increasing the bone-conduction thresholds between 500 Hz and 4 kHz, and reducing the size of air-bone gaps. As 2 kHz is the resonant frequency of the ossicular chain, the largest increase in bone-conduction threshold (around 15 dB) occurs at this frequency – the resultant notch is called Carhart's notch and is a useful clinical marker for medial ossicular-chain fixation.

Tympanometry measures the peak pressure (TPP) and peak-compensated static admittance (Y_{tm}) of the middle ear at the eardrum. As the stapes is ankylosed in otosclerosis, the lateral end of the ossicular chain may still be quite mobile. Therefore, otosclerosis may only slightly reduce the admittance, resulting in either a shallow tympanogram (type A_{S}), or a normal tympanogram (type A). Otosclerosis increases the stiffness of the middle-ear system, raising its resonant frequency. This can be quantified using multi-frequency tympanometry. Thus, a high resonant-frequency pathology such as otosclerosis can be differentiated from low resonant-frequency pathologies such as ossicular discontinuity.

In the absence of a pathology, a loud sound (generally greater than 70 dB above threshold) causes the stapedius muscle to contract, reducing the admittance of the middle ear and softening the perceived loudness of the sound. If the mobility of the stapes is reduced due to otosclerosis, then stapedius muscle contraction does not significantly decrease the admittance. When acoustic reflex testing is conducted, the acoustic reflex thresholds (ART) cannot be determined when attempting to measure on the affected side. Also, a conductive pathology will attenuate the test stimuli, resulting in either elevated reflex thresholds or absent reflexes when the stimulus is presented in the affected ear and measured in the other ear.

=== CT imaging ===
Imaging is usually not pursued in those with uncomplicated conductive hearing loss and characteristic clinical findings. Those with only conductive hearing loss are often treated medically or with surgery without imaging. The diagnosis may be unclear clinically in cases of sensorineural or mixed hearing loss and may become apparent only on imaging. Therefore, imaging is often performed when the hearing loss is sensorineural or mixed.

A high-resolution CT shows very subtle bone findings. However, CT is usually not needed prior to surgery.

Otosclerosis on CT can be graded using the grading system suggested by Symons and Fanning.

- Grade 1, solely fenestral;
- Grade 2, patchy localized cochlear disease (with or without fenestral involvement) to either the basal cochlear turn (grade 2A), or the middle/apical turns (grade 2B), or both the basal turn and the middle/apical turns (grade 2C); and
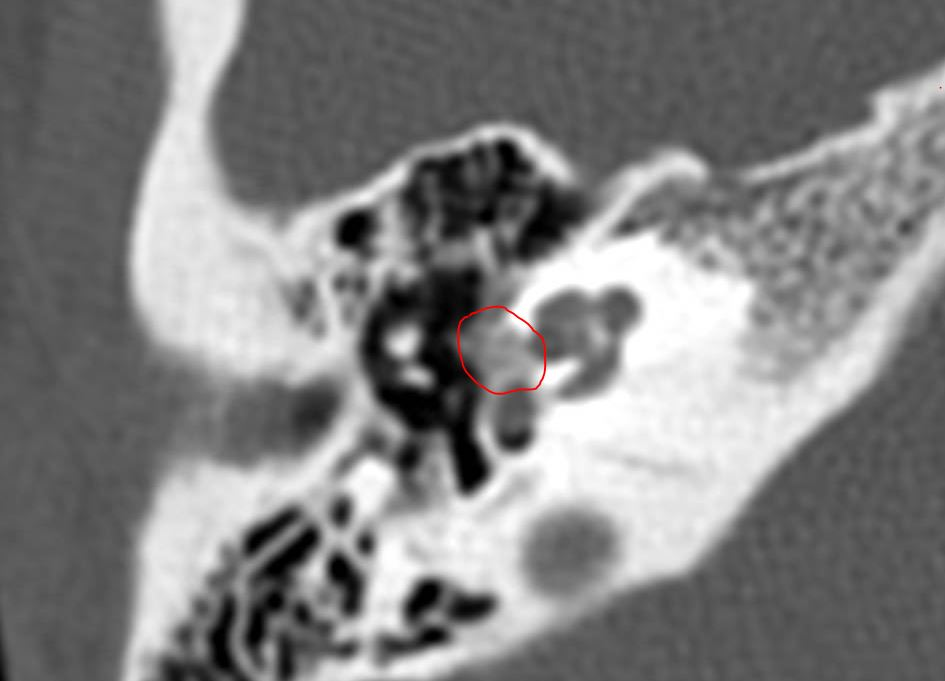
- CT scan of otosclerotic focus in the anterior footplate
  Grade 3, diffuse confluent cochlear involvement (with or without fenestral involvement).

== Treatment ==
Several approaches have been used in the treatment of otosclerosis, including medical, surgical and amplification. Technological innovations in hearing aid technology and cochlear implants are now being used to substitute or complement other interventions.

=== Medical ===
Earlier workers suggested the use of calcium fluoride; now sodium fluoride is the preferred compound. Fluoride ions inhibit the rapid progression of disease. In the otosclerotic ear, there occurs formation of hydroxylapatite crystals which lead to stapes (or other) fixation. The administration of fluoride replaces the hydroxyl radical with fluoride leading to the formation of fluorapatite crystals. Hence, the progression of disease is considerably slowed down and active disease process is arrested. This treatment cannot reverse conductive hearing loss, but may slow the progression of both the conductive and sensorineural components of the disease process. Otofluor, containing sodium fluoride, is one treatment. Recently, some success has been claimed with a second such treatment, bisphosphonate medications that inhibit bone destruction. However, these early reports are based on non-randomized case studies that do not meet standards of clinical trials. There are numerous side-effects to both pharmaceutical treatments, including occasional stomach upset, allergic itching, and increased joint pains which can lead to arthritis. In the worst case, bisphosphonates may lead to osteonecrosis of the auditory canal itself. Finally, neither approach has been proven to be beneficial after the commonly preferred method of surgery has been undertaken.

=== Surgical ===
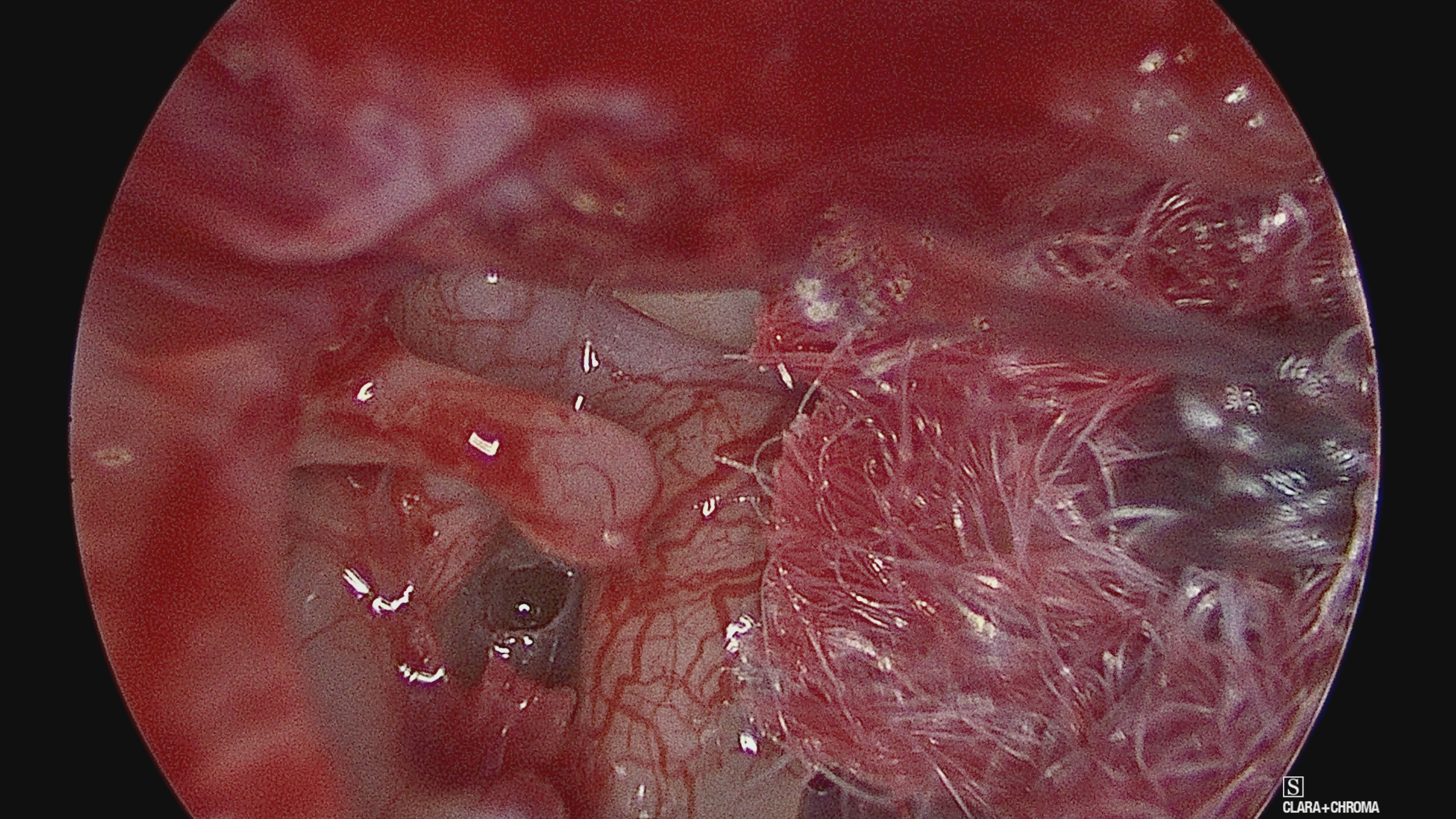
Endoscopic Stapedotomy

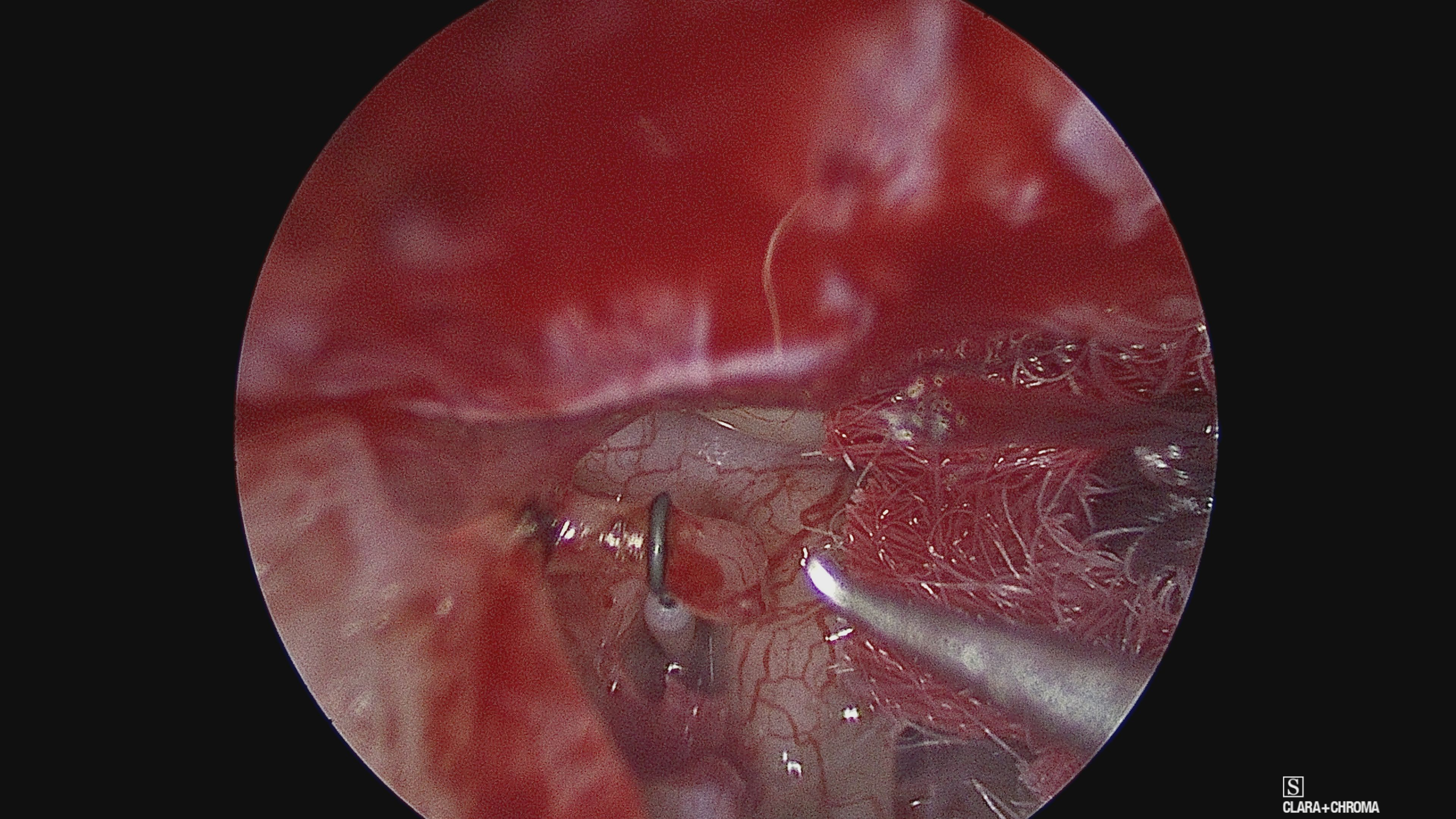
Endocopic view of the ear with the piston inserted into the stapedotomy

There are various methods to treat otosclerosis. However the method of choice is a procedure known as stapedectomy. Early attempts at hearing restoration via the simple freeing of the stapes from its sclerotic attachments to the oval window were met with temporary improvement in hearing, but the conductive hearing loss would almost always recur. A stapedectomy consists of removing a portion of the sclerotic stapes footplate and replacing it with a middle ear implant that is secured to the incus. This procedure restores continuity of ossicular movement and allows transmission of sound waves from the eardrum to the inner ear. A modern variant of this surgery called a stapedotomy, is performed by drilling a small hole in the stapes footplate with a micro-drill or a laser, and the insertion of a piston-like prothesis. The success rate of either surgery depends greatly on the skill and the familiarity with the procedure of the surgeon. However, comparisons have shown stapedotomy to yield results at least as good as stapedectomy, with fewer complications, and thus stapedotomy is preferred in normal circumstances. Recently, Endoscopic stapedotomy has been gaining popularity since its first description by Professor Tarabichi in 1999. The endoscope provides much better view of the stapes footplate without removal of bone to access that structure.

=== Amplification ===
Although hearing aids cannot prevent, cure or inhibit the progression of otosclerosis, they can help treat the largest symptom, hearing loss. Hearing aids can be tuned to specific frequency losses. However, due to the progressive nature of this condition, use of a hearing aid is palliative at best. Untreated otosclerosis can progress to moderate to severe hearing loss, but profound hearing loss is unusual.

== Society and culture ==
=== Notable cases ===
- German composer Ludwig van Beethoven was theorized to have otosclerosis, although this is controversial.
- Victorian journalist Harriet Martineau gradually lost her hearing during her young life, and later medical historians have diagnosed her with probably suffering from otosclerosis as well.
- Theresa Goell, pioneering American archaeologist, lost her hearing due to otosclerosis and relied on lip reading. She had a successful career excavating Mount Nemrut in Turkey, despite the challenges of being a deaf woman in a heavily male-dominated field.
- Margaret Sullavan, American stage and film actress, suffered from the congenital hearing defect otosclerosis that worsened as she aged, making her more and more hard of hearing.
- Howard Hughes the pioneering American aviator, engineer, industrialist, and film producer also suffered from otosclerosis.
- Frankie Valli, lead singer of The Four Seasons, suffered from it in the late 1960s and early 1970s, forcing him to "sing from memory" in the latter part of the 70s (surgery restored most of his hearing by 1980).
- Pittsburgh Penguins forward Steve Downie has otosclerosis.
- The British queen Alexandra of Denmark suffered from it, leading to her social isolation; Queen Alexandra's biographer, Georgina Battiscombe, was able to have "some understanding of Alexandra's predicament" because she too had otosclerosis.
- Adam Savage, co-host of MythBusters, uses a hearing aid due to otosclerosis.
- Sir John Cornforth, Australian-British Nobel Prize in Chemistry laureate
- Zak Abel, English singer-songwriter and musician
