= Tympanum (anatomy) =

External hearing structure in animals

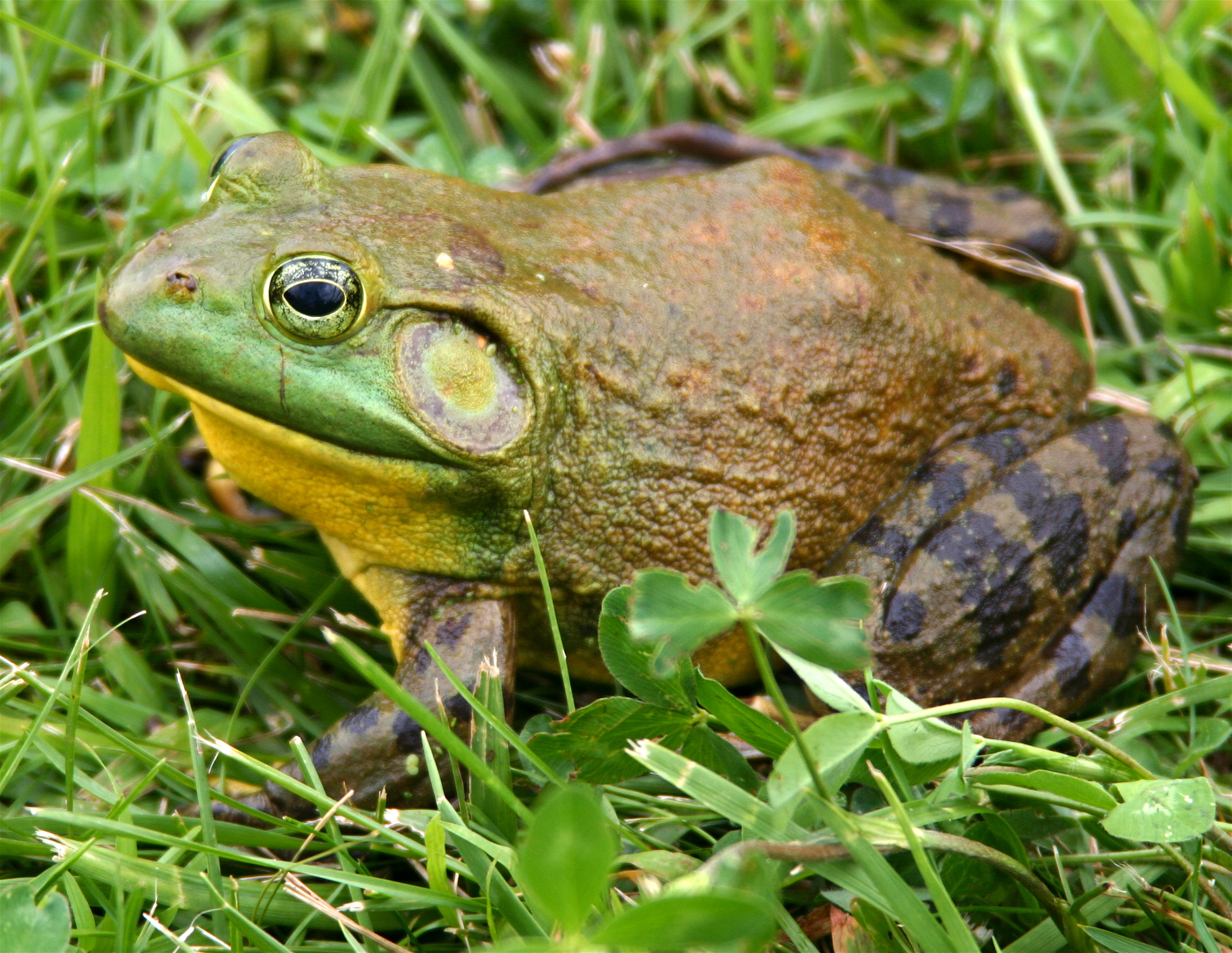
A circular tympanum near the eye of a male North American bullfrog.

The tympanum is an external hearing structure in animals such as mammals, birds, some reptiles, some amphibians and some insects.

Using sound, vertebrates and many insects are capable of sensing their prey, identifying and locating their predators, warning other individuals, and locating potential mates and rivals by hearing the intentional or unintentional sounds they make.

In general, any animal that reacts to sounds or communicates by means of sound, needs to have an auditory mechanism. This typically consists of a membrane capable of vibration known as the tympanum, an air-filled chamber and sensory organs to detect the auditory stimuli.

== Tetrapoda ==
=== Anura ===
In frogs and toads, the tympanum is a large external oval shape membrane made up of nonglandular skin. It is located just behind the eye. It does not process sound waves; it simply transmits them to the inner parts of the amphibian's ear, which is protected from the entry of water and other foreign objects.

A frog's ear drum works in very much the same way as does a human eardrum. It is a membrane that is stretched across a ring of cartilage like a snare drum that vibrates. Crossing the middle ear chamber there is an ossicle called the columella that is connected to the tympanum, and another ossicle, the operculum, that connects this to the oval membrane. This separates the middle ear from the inner ear; and its movements are reflected in vibrations in the fluid in the inner ear; these vibrations cause microscopic hairs to move, which send signals to the frog's brain. A frog's lungs are also involved in the reception of sound, although they are less sensitive than the frog's ear drums.

== See also ==
- Hearing (sense)
- Eardrum
