= Schwartz sign =

Diagnostic indicator for otosclerosis

Schwartz sign, also known as Flemingo's pink sign, is a diagnostic indicator for otosclerosis, a disease of the bones of the middle or inner ear.

In clinical examination of the ear drum, increased vascularity of the promontory may be seen through the ear drum. This sign is known as Flemingo's flush sign or Schwartz's sign. This indicates otospongiosis (active otosclerosis).

In about 10% of cases of otosclerosis, there is a redness of the promontory of the cochlea seen through the tympanic membrane due to prominent vascularity associated with an otospongiotic focus. Be aware of the similar, Brown's sign. This is a red retro-tympanic bulge that blanches on pressure via pneumatic otoscopy. This is secondary to paragangliomata of the middle ear.
