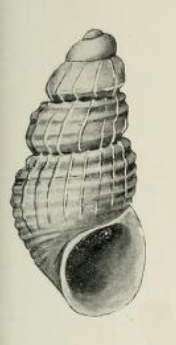
- Shell of Alvania thouinensis (holotype)

Scientific classification
- Kingdom: Animalia
- Phylum: Mollusca
- Class: Gastropoda
- Subclass: Caenogastropoda
- Order: Littorinimorpha
- Superfamily: Rissooidea
- Family: Rissoidae
- Genus: Alvania
- Species: A. thouinensis

Binomial name
- Alvania thouinensis May, 1915

Synonyms
- Alvania (Linemera) thouinensis May, 1915 · alternate representation

= Alvania thouinensis =

Species of gastropod

Alvania thouinensis is a species of small sea snail, a marine gastropod mollusk or micromollusk in the family Rissoidae.

== Description ==
The length of the shell attains 1.8 mm, its diameter 0.8 mm.

(Original description) The minute, pure white shell is elongate. It contains 4½ whorls, including a smooth, shining protoconch of 1½ whorls.

The three adult whorls are rounded. The suture is canaliculate. The first whorl is widest at its lower third, where there is a keel, crossed by narrow axial riblets. These riblets continue on the other whorls, but disappear on the base. On the second whorl about four keels appear, which become stronger and more numerous on the body whorl, where there are about ten, and raise small nodules, where they cross the ribs. The aperture is pyriform. The columella is much rounded. The lip is somewhat expanded. The outer lip is thin and simple.

== Distribution ==
This species in endemic to Australia and occurs off Tasmania.
