= Extracolumella =

The middle ear structure of a lizard. Extracolumella shown in pink.

The extracolumella, sometimes called the extrastapes or hyostapes, is an anatomical structure, generally cartilaginous, found in the middle ear of some tetrapods, which connects the columella to the tympanic membrane, or eardrum. It acts as the intermediary between the eardrum and the columella, between which it transfers sound in the form of vibrations. Once mistakenly thought to have played a role in the evolution of the mammalian ear, it is now believed to be a separate structure from the mammalian ossicles. It is, however, believed to be homologous to the mammalian tympanohyal.

== Function ==
In most vertebrates, sound waves are picked up via the eardrum. Sensory perception, however, occurs within the inner ear. The extracolumella is the outermost of two elements that transfer sound from the eardrum to the inner ear in most non-mammalian vertebrates. As it is generally unossified, it is more flexible than is the columella. It is therefore believed to help modulate sound and to increase sensitivity at a broader range of frequencies.

== Evolution ==
There is currently debate as to whether the extracolumella is homologous to any element present in fish. A 2025 paper examined lizard embryology and argued that the extracolumella develops using genes that originally evolved for creating the gill cartilage. In embryonic frogs, it develops from the second gill arch (hyoid).

The extracolumella is present as a cartilaginous element in at least some frogs, where it is a simple, club-like structure.

Its morphology is highly variable among reptiles; a 2025 study suggested that its homology differs among different reptile groups. On the basis of embryology, they concluded that the extracolumella of turtles is homologous with a portion of the quadrate; that the extracolumella of crocodilians is homologous with part of the hyoid, and that the extracolumella of squamates contains contributions from both the quadrate and the hyoid.

The extracolumella is exceptionally variable among lizards. Typically, the element has four processes that attach to the eardrum; however, the presence and morphology of these processes varies among species. Some lizards have a muscle, the extracolumellar muscle, that attaches to one of these processes. The presence of the extracolumella in snakes is debated; it may be absent, or it may form the cartilaginous tip of the columella.

It is also present in birds.

In some frogs and turtles, the middle ear contains a cartilaginous tympanic disc, believed to be an adaptation to underwater hearing. This is believed to be a modified extracolumella.

Among early non-mammalian synapsids, the extracolumella was historically argued to be present in a role similar to modern reptiles; however, as the element is cartilaginous, it is not preserved, and its presence is inferred due to a lack of a tympanic process on the columella. This suggestion has, however, since met heavy criticism; a 2015 paper examined the stapes in gomphodont cynodonts and failed to find any evidence supporting either an ossified or cartilaginous extracolumella, and the hypothesis is not currently supported. It is believed to be homologous to the mammalian tympanohyal, which fuses to the crista parotica of the otic capsule.

=== Worm lizards ===
In most Amphisbaenia, the extracolumella is particularly lengthened and firmly connects with a layer of skin over dentary bone of the lower jaw. This connection appears to facilitate detection of airborne vibrations in the facial area. The embedding in the skin often occurs at a specially enlarged labial scale. As a result, the amphisbaenian is able to detect substrate vibrations as it burrows through the ground while protecting the internal ear from damage. Amphisbaenians otherwise lack an external ear structure, likely due to selective pressure to protect the middle and inner ears from damage as the animal burrows.

The genera Aprasia, Bipes, and Blanus lack an extracolumella entirely.

Though it is generally cartilaginous, the extracolumella becomes ossified in some amphisbaenians, namely Zarudny's worm lizard and the genus Agamodon. In these taxa, the extracolumella attaches to the skin of the upper jaw, rather than the lower.
