= Acoustic admittance =

Measure of the flow of acoustic energy

- Common symbols: Y_{f}
- Other units: (m^{3}/s)/Pa

Acoustic admittance is the measure of the flow of acoustic energy. It is measured in cubic meters per second (m^{3}/s), per pascal (Pa). By nature, acoustic impedance is the reciprocal of acoustic admittance. Immittance is a concept which combines both acoustic admittance and acoustic impedance.

Acoustic admittance is widely used in bioacoustics where immittance is indispensable for its ability to assist with differential diagnosis of middle ear disease using tympanometry. Acoustic admittance also has applications in construction and engineering, and has been utilized to research and develop an open-cell polyurethane foam that had mean pore sizes of 0.01 - 0.08 cm and a fibrous structure.
