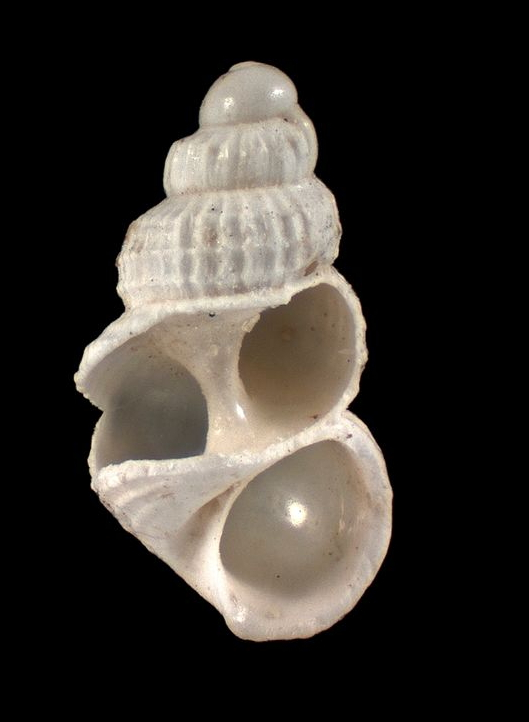
- Shell of Alvania pinguis (specimen at the Museum of New Zealand)

Scientific classification
- Kingdom: Animalia
- Phylum: Mollusca
- Class: Gastropoda
- Subclass: Caenogastropoda
- Order: Littorinimorpha
- Superfamily: Rissooidea
- Family: Rissoidae
- Genus: Alvania
- Species: A. pinguis

Binomial name
- Alvania pinguis (W. H. Webster, 1906)

Synonyms
- Alvania (Linemera) pinguis (W. H. Webster, 1906) · alternate representation; Alvinia (Linemera) pingue [sic] (misspelling); Rissoa pingue W. H. Webster, 1906 (superseded combination)

= Alvania pinguis =

Species of gastropod

Alvania pinguis is a species of small sea snail, a marine gastropod mollusk or micromollusk in the family Rissoidae.

== Description ==
The length of the shell attains 2 mm, its diameter 1.25 mm.

(Original description) The white shell consists of 4½ rounded but slightly flattened whorls, of which a very glossy protoconch occupies the first one and a half.

Sculpture: Fine spiral lines, three on the third and four on the body whorl above the aperture. The spirals are crossed by close-set longitudinal ribs as strong as the spirals. They die out on a level with, the posterior angle of the aperture, and the base has three spirals only. The columella is vertically arcuated. The aperture is diagonal-oval, a little angled where the outer lip joins the columella, behind which is a deep groove. The outer lip is thickened externally, especially where it joins the body whorl.

== Distribution ==
This species occurs is endemic to New Zealand and occurs off Northland, off Great Barrier Island.
