= Batrachian operculum =

The batrachian operculum or simply operculum is an ossicle present in the middle ear of the clade Batrachia (frogs and salamanders). Connected by muscles to the shoulder girdle, it is believed to play a role in hearing by transmitting sound from the ground to the ear via the forelimb.

== Anatomy ==
The batrachian operculum is a small element located in the fenestra ovalis of the middle ear, posterior to the columella. It is typically, though not always, cartilaginous. Via a specialised muscle, the opercularis, the operculum connects the middle ear to the scapula or suprascapula, allowing for vibrations to be transmitted from the ground via the forelimb. In particular, it is believed to aid in the detection of low-frequency sounds in the lagenar system.

== Evolution ==
In bony fishes, a group of dermal bones cover the gills and are collectively referred to as the operculum. These bones are lost early in the evolution of tetrapods, allowing for a mobile neck. Historically, the batrachian operculum was thought to be homologous with that of fishes. As of 2016, however, the batrachian operculum is thought to have an independent origin, and not be a retained fish operculum.

The early history of the operculum is poorly known, as the element is small and generally cartilaginous, inhibiting its ability to fossilise.The operculum is considered a synapomorphy of the clade Batrachia and is generally considered to be absent in caecilians; it has been suggested that the fossil Eocaecilia may preserve evidence of the element, but this is currently considered unlikely. A further suggestion that the columella of modern caecilians consists of a fused columella and operculum; this is also considered uncertain on the basis of embryology.

It is unclear if the batrachian operculum is present in albanerpetonids, as their middle ear is not known.

In some salamanders, the batrachian operculum is ossified. Though the operculum is present in neotenous taxa such as cryptobranchids, amphiumids, sirenids, and proteids, the opercularis muscle is absent, reflecting the fact that it typically develops later in life in salamanders. Among hynobiids and ambystomatids, the operculum fuses to the otic capsule. In salamandrids, the columella is absent and the operculum serves as the primary ossicle.
