= Incus =

Bone of the middle ear

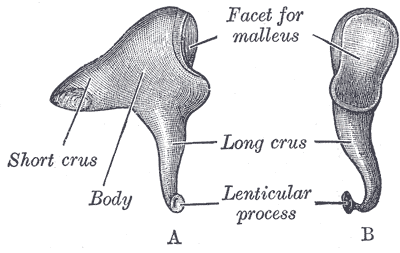
- Left incus. A. From within. B. From the front.

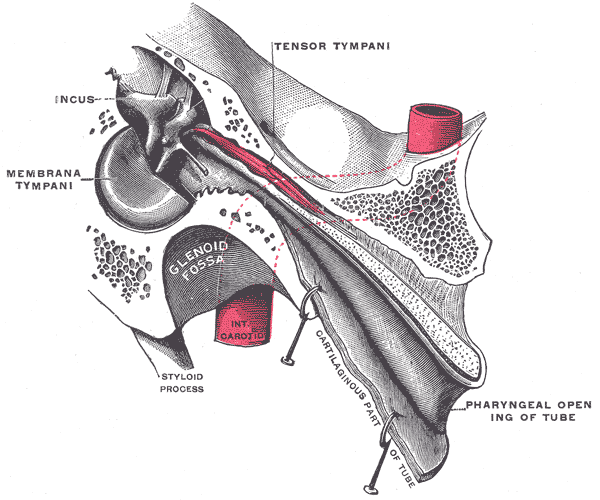
- Auditory tube, laid open by a cut in its long axis.

Details
- Pronunciation: /ˈɪŋkəs/
- Precursor: First branchial arch
- Part of: Middle ear
- Articulations: Incudomalleolar and incudostapedial joint

Identifiers
- Latin: incus
- MeSH: D007188
- TA98: A15.3.02.038
- TA2: 888
- FMA: 52752

The incus (pl.: incudes) or anvil in the ear is one of three small bones (ossicles) in the middle ear. The incus receives vibrations from the malleus, to which it is connected laterally, and transmits these to the stapes medially. The incus is named for its resemblance to an anvil (Latin: incus).

== Structure ==
The incus is the second of three ossicles, very small bones in the middle ear which act to transmit sound. It is shaped like an anvil, and has a long and short crus extending from the body, which articulates with the malleus. The short crus attaches to the posterior ligament of the incus. The long crus articulates with the stapes at the lenticular process.

The superior ligament of the incus attaches at the body of the incus to the roof of the tympanic cavity.

== Function ==
Vibrations in the middle ear are received via the tympanic membrane. The malleus, resting on the membrane, conveys vibrations to the incus. This in turn conveys vibrations to the stapes.

== History ==
"Incus" means "anvil" in Latin. Several sources attribute the discovery of the incus to the anatomist and philosopher Alessandro Achillini. The first brief written description of the incus was by Berengario da Carpi in his Commentaria super anatomia Mundini (1521). Andreas Vesalius, in his De humani corporis fabrica, was the first to compare the second element of the ossicles to an anvil, thereby giving it the name incus. The final part of the long limb was once described as a "fourth ossicle" by Pieter Paaw in 1615.

== Evolution ==
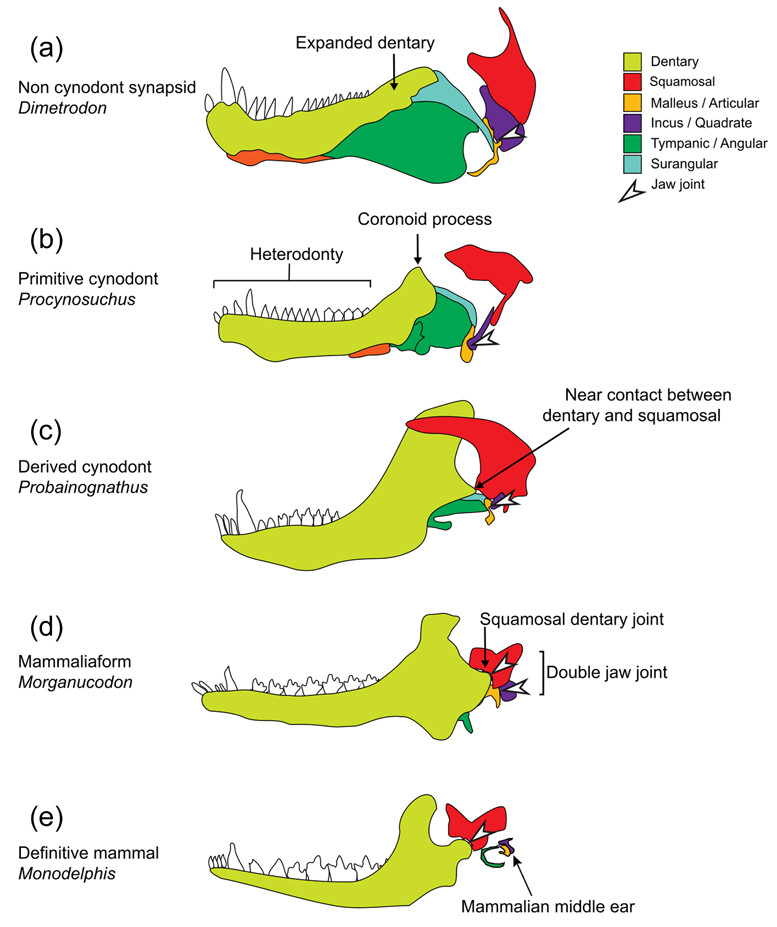
Diagram showing synapsid jaw evolution from early "pelycosaur" synapsids to modern mammals, with the incus/quadrate labelled in purple

The incus is evolutionarily derived from the quadrate, a bone that forms the upper half of the jaw joint in non-mammalian vertebrates. During the evolution of mammals, the suspension of the jaw changed to a dentary-squamosal articulation; the quadrate and the articular took on sound-conduction roles, became smaller, and detached from the jaw, becoming known as the incus and the malleus, respectively.

The quadrate, in turn, evolved as the rear portion of the palatoquadrate, which was the ancestral upper jaw of gnathostomes. In early members of this clade (and in modern sharks and rays), the palatoquadrate articulated with Meckel's cartilage to form the jaw joint. The palatoquadrate is an element of the mandibular arch of the splanchnocranium, meaning that the incus is ultimately an evolutionary descendant of the gill arch.

== Additional images ==
Ossicles

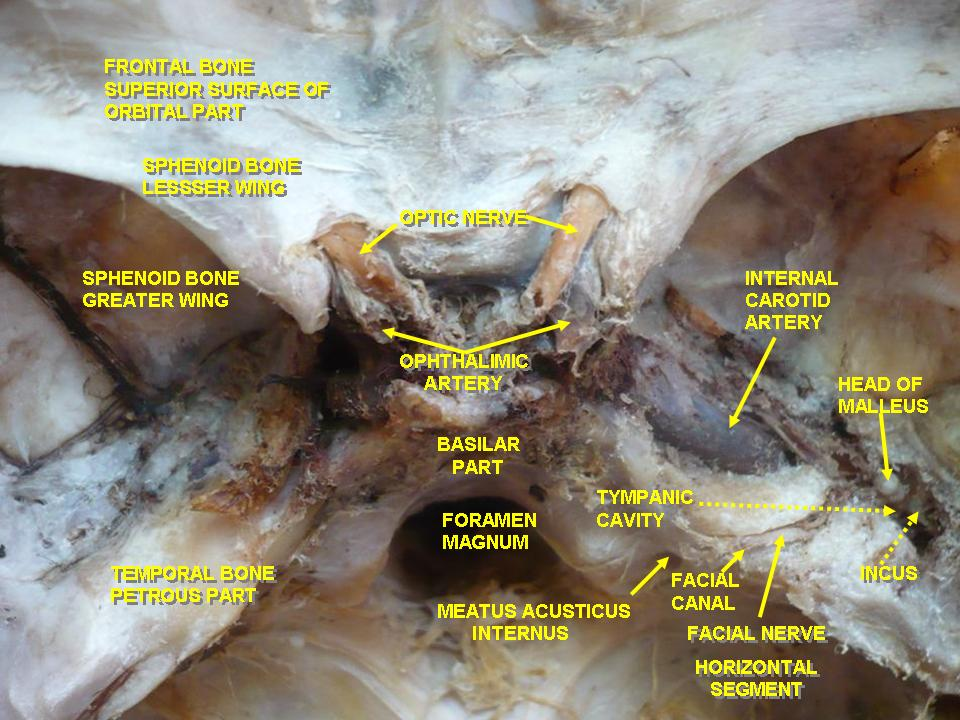
Tympanic cavity. Facial canal. Internal carotid artery.

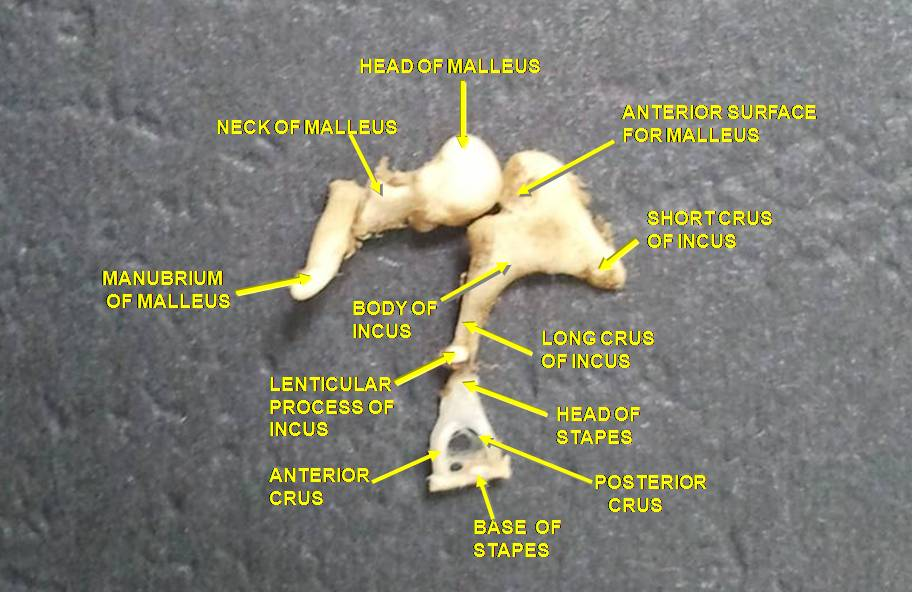
Auditory ossicles. Tympanic cavity. Deep dissection.

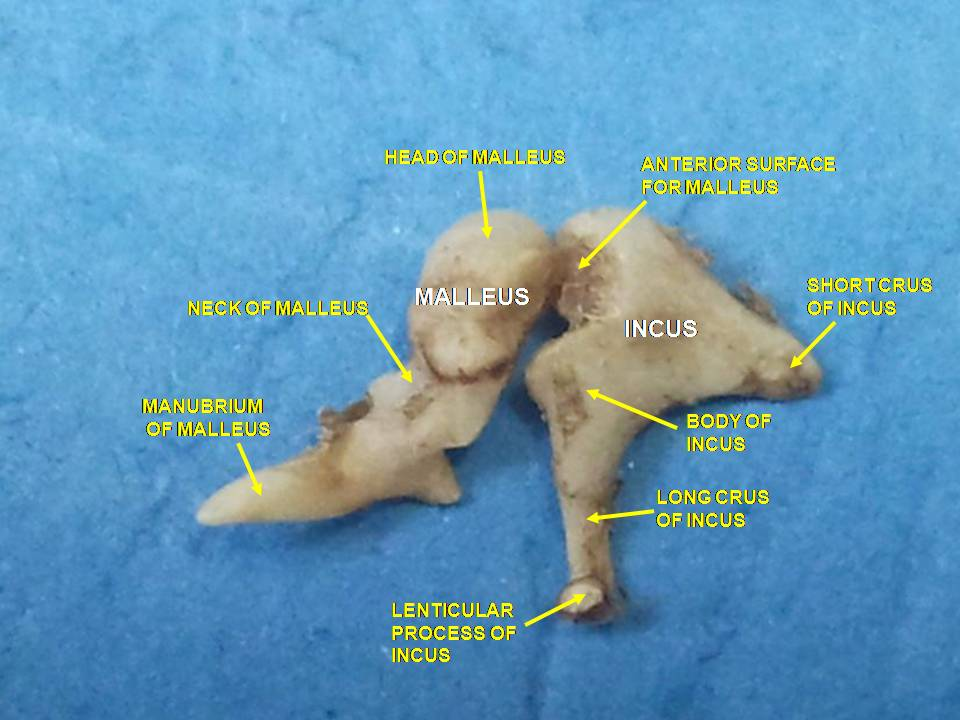
Auditory ossicles. Incus and malleus. Deep dissection.
