= Superior ligament of incus =

Ligament of the middle ear

Details
- From: Incus
- To: Malleus

Identifiers
- Latin: ligamentum incudis superius
- TA98: A15.3.02.057
- TA2: 1642
- FMA: 60882

The superior ligament of the incus is a fibrous band that crosses from the body of the incus to the roof of the tympanic cavity just posterior to the superior ligament of the malleus.
