= Evolution of mammalian auditory ossicles =

Middle ear bones evolved from jaw bones

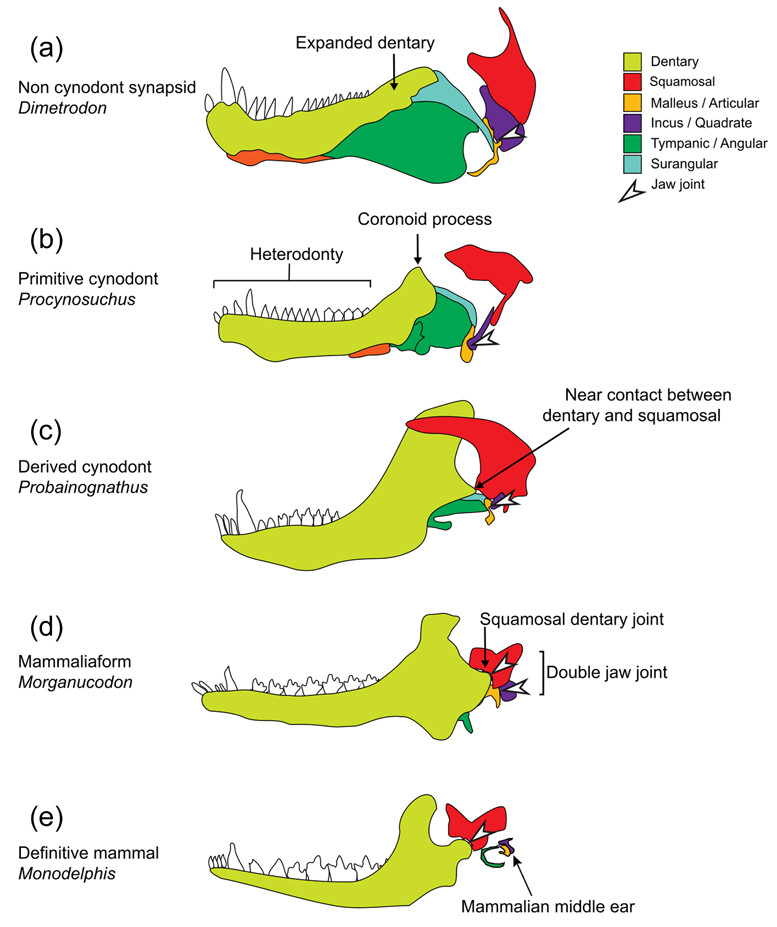
Diagram showing synapsid jaw evolution from early "pelycosaur" synapsids to modern mammals

The evolution of mammalian auditory ossicles was an evolutionary process that resulted in the formation of the mammalian middle ear, where the three middle ear bones or ossicles, namely the incus, malleus and stapes (a.k.a. "the anvil, hammer, and stirrup"), are a defining characteristic of mammals. The event is well-documented and important academically as a demonstration of transitional forms and exaptation, the re-purposing of existing structures during evolution.

The ossicles are homologous to skull bones present in most other tetrapods, including amphibians, sauropsids (which include extant reptiles and birds), and early synapsids (which include ancestors of mammals). The reptilian quadrate, articular and columella bones are homologs of the mammalian incus, malleus and stapes, respectively. In reptiles (and early synapsids by association), the eardrum is connected to the inner ear via a single bone, the columella, while the upper and lower jaws contain several bones not found in modern mammals. Over the course of mammalian evolution, one bone from the upper jaw (the quadrate) and one from the lower jaw (the articular) lost their function in the jaw articulation and migrated to form the middle ear. The shortened columella connected to these bones to form a kinematic chain of three ossicles, which serve to amplify air-sourced fine vibrations transmitted from the eardrum and facilitate more acute hearing in terrestrial environments.

== History ==
Following on the ideas of Étienne Geoffroy Saint-Hilaire (1818), and studies by Johann Friedrich Meckel the Younger (1820), Carl Gustav Carus (1818), Martin Rathke (1825), and Karl Ernst von Baer (1828), the relationship between the reptilian jaw bones and mammalian middle-ear bones was first established on the basis of embryology and comparative anatomy by Karl Bogislaus Reichert in 1837. These ideas were advanced by Ernst Gaupp, and are now known as the Reichert–Gaupp theory. Reichert mainly studied the embryological development of the second pharyngeal arch (as in Reichert's cartilage). Despite publishing decades before the publication of On the Origin of Species in 1859, Reichert theorized that part of the reptilian jaw bones and two of the mammalian ossicles are homologous in some sense.

The discovery of the link in homology between the reptilian jaw joint and mammalian malleus and incus is considered an important milestone in the history of comparative anatomy. Work on extinct theromorphs by Owen (1845), and continued by Seeley, Broom, and Watson, was pivotal in discovering the intermediate steps to this change. The transition between the "reptilian" jaw and the "mammalian" middle ear was not bridged in the fossil record until the 1950s with the elaboration of such fossils as the now-famous Morganucodon.

During embryonic development, the incus and malleus arise from the same first pharyngeal arch as the mandible and maxilla, and are served by mandibular and maxillary division of the trigeminal nerve. Recent genetic studies are able to relate the development of the ossicles from the embryonic arch to hypothesized evolutionary history. Bapx1, also known as Nkx3.2 (a member of the NK2 class of homeobox genes), is implicated in the change from the jaw bones of non-mammals to the ossicles of mammals. Other implicated genes include the Dlx genes, Prx genes, and Wnt genes.

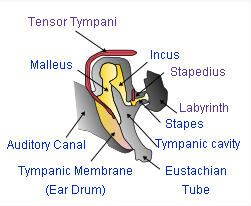
A typical mammalian middle ear: sound makes the tympanum (eardrum) vibrate; 3 small bones, the malleus, incus and stapes, transmit the vibrations to the labyrinth (inner ear), which transforms the vibrations into nerve signals.

== Defining characteristic of mammals ==
Living mammal species can be identified by the presence in females of mammary glands which produce milk. Other features are required when classifying fossils, since mammary glands and other soft-tissue features are not visible in fossils. Paleontologists therefore use the ossicles as distinguishing bony features shared by all living mammals (including monotremes), but not present in any of the early Triassic therapsids ("mammal-like reptiles").

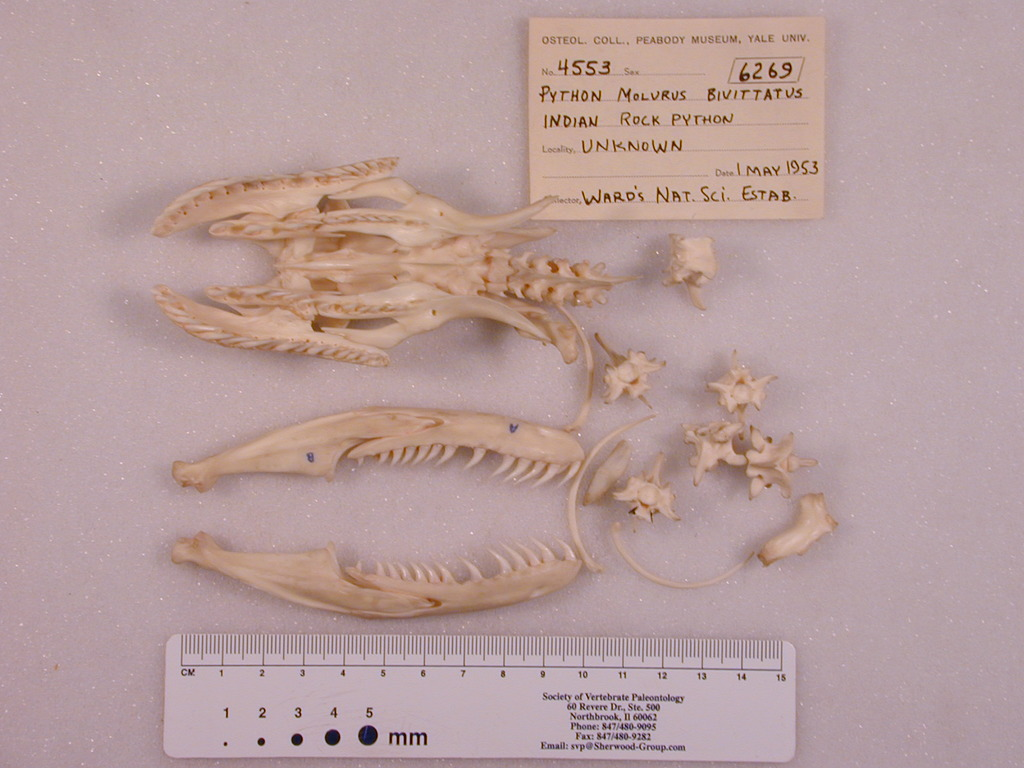
Upper and lower portions of a python skull, displaying multiple bony components of the upper and lower jaws. Courtesy of the Peabody Museum of Natural History; Division of Vertebrate Zoology; Yale University.

Early amniotes had a jaw joint composed of the articular (a small bone at the back of the lower jaw) and the quadrate (a small bone at the back of the upper jaw). All non-mammalian amniotes use this system including lizards, crocodilians, dinosaurs (and their descendants the birds) and therapsids; so the only ossicle in their middle ears is the stapes. The mammalian jaw joint is composed of different skull bones, including the dentary (the lower jaw bone which carries the teeth) and the squamosal (another small skull bone). In mammals, the quadrate and articular bones have evolved into the incus and malleus bones in the middle ear.

The mammalian middle ear contains three tiny bones known as the ossicles: malleus, incus, and stapes. The ossicles are a complex system of levers whose functions include: reducing the amplitude of the vibrations; increasing the mechanical force of vibrations; and thus improving the efficient transmission of sound energy from the eardrum to the inner ear structures. The ossicles act as the mechanical analog of an electrical transformer, matching the mechanical impedance of vibrations in air to vibrations in the liquid of the cochlea. The net effect of this impedance matching is to greatly increase the overall sensitivity and upper frequency limits of mammalian hearing, as compared to reptilian hearing. The details of these structures and their effects vary noticeably between different mammal species, even when the species are as closely related as humans and chimpanzees.

== Phylogeny ==
The following simplified cladogram displays relationships between tetrapods:

- Tetrapods
  - Amphibians
  - Reptiliomorphs
    - Amniotes
      - Sauropsids
      - Synapsids
        - other synapsids
        - Eupelycosaurs
          - other eupelycosaurs
          - Therapsids
            - other therapsids
            - Mammals

The first fully terrestrial vertebrates were amniotes, which developed in eggs with internal membranes which allowed the developing embryo to breathe but kept water in. The first amniotes arose in the late Carboniferous from the ancestral reptiliomorphs (a group of amphibians whose only living descendants are amniotes). Within a few million years two important amniote lineages became distinct: the synapsid ancestors of mammals, and the sauropsids ancestors of lizards, snakes, crocodilians, dinosaurs and birds.

The evolution of mammalian jaw joints and ears did not occur simultaneously with the evolution of other mammalian features. In other words, jaw joints and ears do not define any except the most recent groups of mammals.

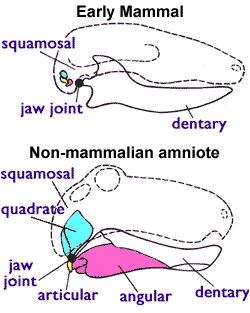
Mammalian and non-mammalian jaws. In the mammal configuration, the quadrate and articular bones are much smaller and form part of the middle ear. Note that in mammals the lower jaw consists of only the dentary bone.

== Early tetrapod and amniote ears ==
In modern amniotes (including mammals), the middle ear collects airborne sounds through an eardrum and transmits vibrations to the inner ear via thin cartilaginous and ossified structures. These structures usually include the stapes (a stirrup-shaped auditory ossicle).

Early tetrapods likely did not possess eardrums. Eardrums appear to have evolved independently three to six times. In basal members of the 3 major clades of amniotes (synapsids, eureptiles, and parareptiles) the stapes bones are relatively massive props that support the braincase, and this function prevents them from being used as part of the hearing system. However, there is increasing evidence that synapsids, eureptiles and parareptiles developed eardrums connected to the inner ear by stapes during the Permian.

== Early therapsid jaws and ears ==
The jaws of early synapsids, including the ancestors of mammals, were similar to those of other tetrapods of the time, with a lower jaw consisting of a tooth-bearing dentary bone and several smaller posterior bones. The jaw joint consisted of the articular bone in the lower jaw and the quadrate in the upper jaw. The early pelycosaurs (late Carboniferous and early Permian) likely did not have tympanic membranes (external eardrums). Additionally, their massive stapes bones supported the braincase, with the lower ends resting on the quadrates. Their descendants, the therapsids (including mammalian ancestors), probably had tympanic membranes in contact with the quadrate bones. The stapes remained in contact with the quadrate bone, but functioned as auditory ossicles rather than supports for the brain case. As a result, the quadrate bones of therapsids likely had a dual function in both the jaw joint and auditory system.

== Twin-jointed jaws ==
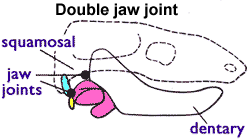
Morganucodontidae and other transitional forms had both types of jaw joint: dentary-squamosal (front) and articular-quadrate (rear).

During the Permian and early Triassic the dentary of therapsids, including the ancestors of mammals, continually enlarged while other jaw bones were reduced.

Eventually, the dentary bone evolved to make contact with the squamosal, a bone in the upper jaw located anterior to the quadrate, allowing two simultaneous jaw joints: an anterior "mammalian" joint between the dentary and squamosal and a posterior "reptilian" joint between the quadrate and articular. This "twin-jointed jaw" can be seen in late cynodonts and early mammaliforms. Morganucodon is one of the first discovered and most thoroughly studied of the mammaliforms, since an unusually large number of morganucodont fossils have been found. It is an example of a nearly perfect evolutionary intermediate between the mammal-like reptiles and extant mammals.

== Early mammals ==
The earliest mammals were generally small animals, and were likely nocturnal insectivores. This suggests a plausible source of evolutionary pressure: with these small bones in the middle ear, a mammal has extended its range of hearing for higher-pitched sounds which would improve the detection of insects in the dark.

The evidence that the malleus and incus are homologous to the reptilian articular and quadrate was originally embryological, and since this discovery an abundance of transitional fossils has both supported the conclusion and given a detailed history of the transition. The evolution of the stapes (from the columella) was an earlier and distinct event.

The evolution of the mammalian middle ear appears to have occurred in two steps. A partial middle ear formed by the departure of postdentary bones from the dentary, and happened independently in the ancestors of monotremes and therians. The second step was the transition to a definite mammalian middle ear, and evolved independently at least three times in the ancestors of today's monotremes, marsupials and placentals.

== Fossil evidence for mammal-like jaws and ears ==
As the dentary bone of the lower jaw continued to enlarge during the Triassic, the older quadrate-articular joint fell out of use. Some of the bones were lost, but the quadrate, the articular, and the angular bones became free-floating and associated with the stapes. This occurred at least twice in the mammaliformes. The multituberculates had jaw joints that consisted of only the dentary and squamosal bones, and the quadrate and articular bones were part of the middle ear. Other features of their teeth, jaws and skulls are significantly different from those of mammals.

=== Hadrocodium ===
In the lineage most closely related to mammals, the jaws of Hadrocodium (about 195M years ago in the very early Jurassic) suggest that it may have been the first to have a nearly fully mammalian middle ear: it lacks the trough at the rear of the lower jaw, over which the eardrum stretched in therapsids and earlier mammaliformes. The absence of this trough suggests that Hadrocodium's ear was part of the cranium, as it is in mammals, and that the former articular and quadrate had migrated to the middle ear and become the malleus and incus. Hadrocodium's dentary has a "bay" at the rear which mammals lack, a hint that the dentary bone retained the same shape as if the articular and quadrate had remained part of the jaw joint. However, several studies have cast doubt on whether Hadrocodium did indeed possess a definitive mammalian middle ear; Hadrocodium likely had an ossified connection between the middle ear and the jaw, which is not visible in the fossil evidence due to limited preservation. Researchers now hypothesize that the definitive mammalian middle ear did not emerge any earlier than the late Jurassic (~163M years ago).

=== Teinolophos ===
It has been suggested that a relatively large trough in the jaw bone of the early Cretaceous monotreme Teinolophos provides evidence of a pre-mammalian jaw joint, because therapsids and many mammaliforms had such troughs in which the articular and angular bones "docked". Thus, Teinolophos had a pre-mammalian middle ear, indicating that the mammalian middle ear ossicles evolved independently in monotremes and in other mammals. A more recent analysis of Teinolophos concluded that the trough was a channel for the large vibration and electrical sensory nerves terminating in the bill (a defining feature of the modern platypus). Thus, the trough is not evidence that Teinolophos had a pre-mammalian jaw joint and a pre-mammalian middle ear.

=== Yanoconodon ===
A recently discovered intermediate form is the primitive mammal Yanoconodon, which lived approximately 125 million years ago in the Mesozoic era. In Yanoconodon the ossicles have separated from the jaw and serve the hearing function in the middle ear, yet maintain a slender connection to the jaw via the ossified Meckel's cartilage. Maintaining a connection via the ossified Meckel's cartilage may have been evolutionary advantageous since the auditory ossicles were not connected to the cranium in Yanoconodon (as they are in extant mammals), and required structural support via Meckel's cartilage.

== Effects on hearing ==
The frequency range and sensitivity of the ear is dependent on the shape and arrangement of the middle-ear bones. In the reptilian lineage, hearing depends on the conduction of low-frequency vibrations through the ground or bony structures (such as the columella). By modifying the articular bone, quadrate bone, and columella into small ossicles, mammals were able to hear a wider range of high-frequency airborne vibrations. Hearing within mammals is further aided by a tympanum in the outer ear and an elongated lagena (cochlea) in the inner ear. The cochlea has a golden spiral shape that optimises sound distribution for mammal ears.

== See also ==
- Evolution of mammals
- Feredocodon
- Microtherulum
- Yanoconodon
- quadrate bone
- articular bone
- columella
- Vilevolodon
