= Posterior ligament of incus =

Ligament of the middle ear

Details
- From: incus
- To: incus

Identifiers
- Latin: ligamentum incudis posterius
- TA98: A15.3.02.058
- TA2: 1643
- FMA: 60883

The posterior ligament of the incus is a fibrous band that connects the tip of the short crus of the incus to the fossa incudis, running to the mastoid (posterior wall of the middle ear chamber). The posterior incudal ligament plays an important role in the vibration of the middle ear bones: together with the anterior ligament of the malleus, it forms a pivotal axis around which the ossicles rotate. This rotation conveys vibrations from the tympanum to the oval window on the bony labyrinth (where they can be transduced into electrical signals transmitted to the nervous system).
