= Incudostapedial joint =

Small joint between the incus and the stapes

Details

Identifiers
- Latin: articulatio incudostapedia
- TA98: A15.3.02.051
- TA2: 1648
- FMA: 60065

The incudostapedial joint is a small, synovial ball-and-socket joint between the incus (anvil) and the stapes (stirrup). The joint's function is to transfer vibrations between the two ossicles. The incudostapedial joint lies between the long leg of the incus (long crus, or crus longum incudis) and the head of the stapes (caput stapedis). The long leg moves with the rest of the incus, and a small knob, the lenticular process, articulates with the head of the stapes.

== Biophysics ==
Although the joint is synovial, it nonetheless allows only for a very limited, linear range of motion. All of the ossicles move almost as a single unit.

As the transfer of kinetic energy from the incident sound waves to the perilymph of the inner ear involves a loss of energy, the ossicular system functions to compensate for the loss by decreasing the lever ratio between the surface of the eardrum and the base of the stapes, but also through the ratio between the manubrium mallei (the handle of the malleus) and the long leg of the incus. The ossicular system thus increases the force of transmitted oscillations by some 25 times between the tymphanic membrane and the base of the stapes.

== See also ==
- Incudomalleolar joint – Synovial joint between malleus and incus
