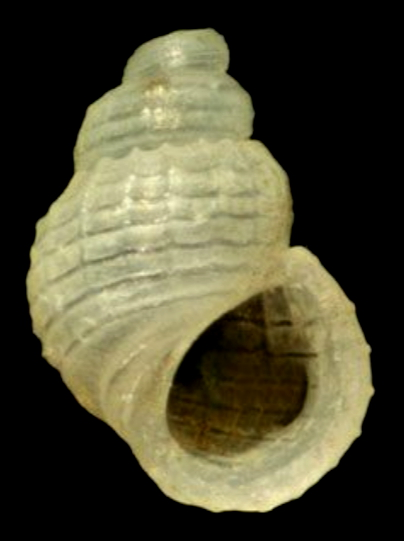
- Shell of Alvania moniziana (specimen at the Natural History Museum, Rotterdam)

Scientific classification
- Kingdom: Animalia
- Phylum: Mollusca
- Class: Gastropoda
- Subclass: Caenogastropoda
- Order: Littorinimorpha
- Superfamily: Rissooidea
- Family: Rissoidae
- Genus: Alvania
- Species: A. moniziana

Binomial name
- Alvania moniziana (Watson, 1873)

Synonyms
- Alvinia moniziana (R. B. Watson, 1873); Moniziella moniziana (R. B. Watson, 1873); Rissoa moniziana R. B. Watson, 1873 ·

= Alvania moniziana =

Species of gastropod

Alvania moniziana is a species of small sea snail, a marine gastropod mollusk or micromollusk in the family Rissoidae.

== Description ==
The length of the shell varies between 1.5 mm and 2 mm.

(Original description) The conic-oval shel lis rather thin, not glossy, frosted and transparent. The whorls rise in steps.

Sculpture. The longitudinal ribs are very rarely present on the penultimate whorl, indistinct, rather irregular and narrow. Somewhat more often they appear on the body whorl very indistinctly below the suture, and even extend below the periphery, but generally, when seen at all, they resemble faint irregular puckerings close below the suture. The labial rib is strong relatively to the thickness of the shell. It is cut off by a nick from previous whorl and is very sinuous relatively to the plane of the spire. It is very faintly crossed by spiral threads. There are 7 - 9 spiral threads on the body whorl, transparent and prominent. The first, nearest the suture, always projects less than the others, and often disappears, as does also the second occasionally. The fifth is the prolongation of the suture. The seventh and eighth (sometimes it is the sixth and seventh, rarely the eighth and ninth) are parted by an interval deeper and wider than any of the others. Hence a hunch on the base. The ninth merely encircles the columella, and lies close to the outer left margin of the aperture. On the third and on the lower part of the second whorls there are four of these threads. In the second whorl they are abruptly cut off. And above this, on the embryonic shell, they are replaced by six microscopic hair-like spirals. The interstices of the spiral threads are 3 to 4 times the breadth of the threads, and are delicately but very closely tooled with excessively minute undulated spiral scratches, of which about 4 go to 1/1000 inch. These cause the frosted appearance of the shell. When the longitudinal ribs are present, the threads in crossing them form faint knobs, and the whorl is cut into long narrow meshes.

The colour of the shell is pure white, transparent on the threads, frosted in the intervals.

The spire rises in steps, is short, blunt, and truncated, the apex being turned in. It contains 4 - 5 whorls, well-rounded, with a sloping shoulder below the suture, of very regular increase. The suture is deep and very straight. The aperture is very open, large for size of shell, very triangular in consequence of the extreme straightness of the line across the body and from the flattening on the base. The outer lip is thick, with a sharp projecting flange on the inward side. At the outer lower corner it advances so much in front of the plane of the aperture as almost to form a sinus and a channel. The inner lip is projected (rather than reflected) on the columella, so as to form a distinct umbilical groove or chink. Across the body it almost dies away, but reaches the outer lip, which throws out a slight pad to meet it.

== Distribution ==
This species occurs in the Atlantic Ocean off Madeira and the Azores.
