= Ossicles =

Small bones in the middle ear

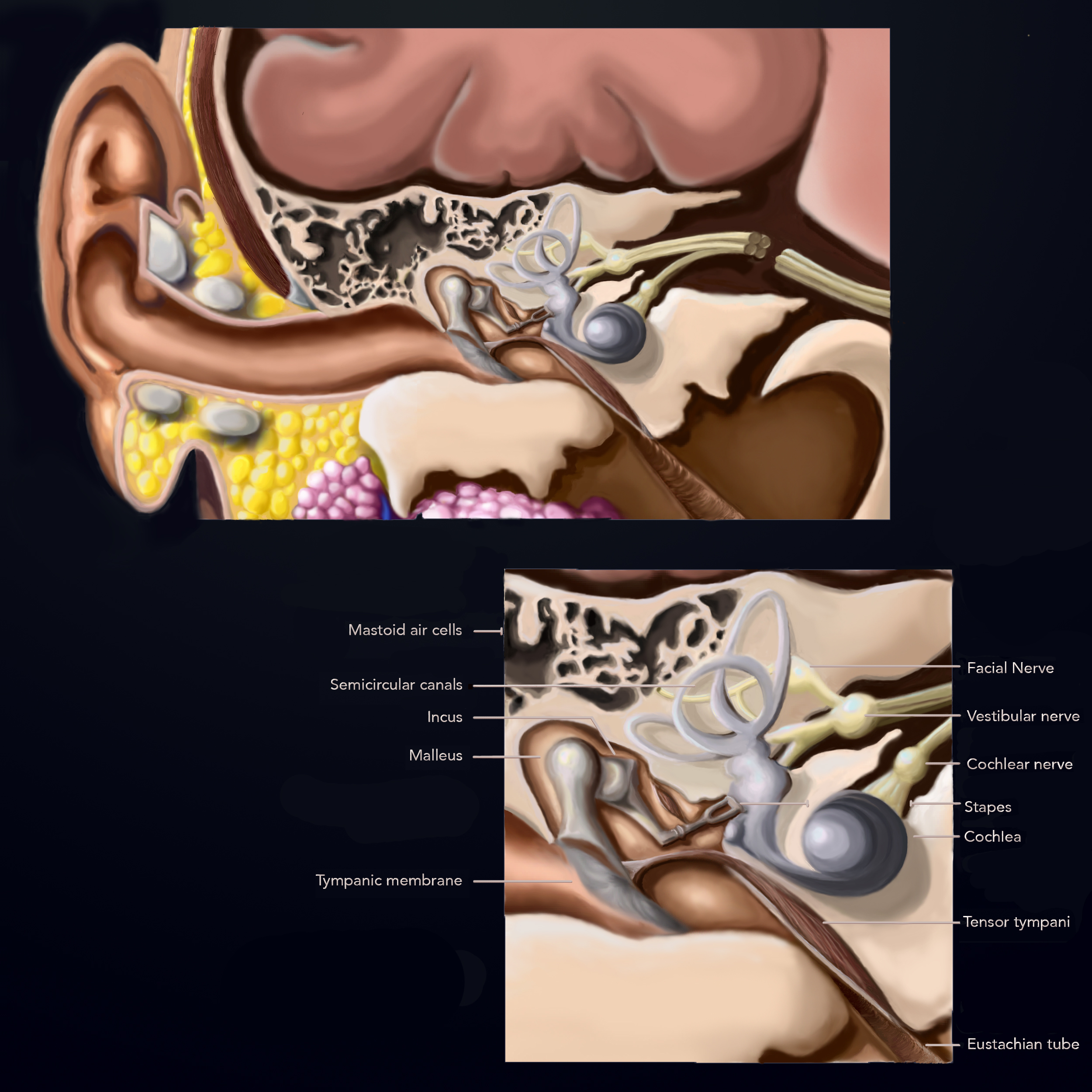
- Auditory ossicles: malleus, incus and stapes

Details
- Part of: Middle ear

Identifiers
- Latin: Ossicula auditus, ossicula auditoria
- MeSH: D004429
- TA98: A02.1.17.001
- TA2: 880
- FMA: 52750

The ossicles (also called auditory ossicles) are irregular bones in the middle ear of humans and other animals, and are among the smallest bones in the human body. Although the term "ossicle" literally means "tiny bone" (from Latin: ossiculum) and may refer to any small bone throughout the body, it typically refers specifically to the malleus, incus and stapes ("hammer, anvil, and stirrup") of the middle ear. The term is also used to refer to other bones of the middle ear present in other animals, namely the columella (evolutionarily the same bone as the stapes), the extracolumella, and the batrachian operculum.

The auditory ossicles serve as a kinematic chain to transmit and intensify sound vibrations collected from the air by the ear drum to the fluid-filled labyrinth (cochlea). The absence of the auditory ossicles would constitute a moderate-to-severe conductive hearing loss.

== Etymology ==
The term ossicle derives from ossiculum, a diminutive of "bone" (Latin: os; genitive ossis). The malleus gets its name from Latin malleus, meaning "hammer", the incus gets its name from Latin incus meaning "anvil" from incudere meaning "to forge with a hammer", and the stapes gets its name from Modern Latin "stirrup", probably an alteration of Late Latin stapia related to stare "to stand" and pedem, an accusative of pes "foot", so called because the bone is shaped like a stirrup – this was an invented Modern Latin word for "stirrup", for which there was no classical Latin word, as the ancients did not use stirrups.

== Structure ==
In humans and other mammals the ossicles (in order from superficial to deep) are: the malleus, incus, and stapes, terms that in English are translated as "the hammer, anvil, and stirrup".

- The malleus ("hammer") articulates with the incus through the incudomalleolar joint and is attached to the tympanic membrane (eardrum), from which vibrational sound pressure motion is passed.
- The incus ("anvil") is connected to both the other bones.
- The stapes ("stirrup") articulates with the incus through the incudostapedial joint and is attached to the membrane of the fenestra ovalis, (opening between the middle ear and the vestibule of the inner ear also known as oval window). It is the smallest bone in the body.
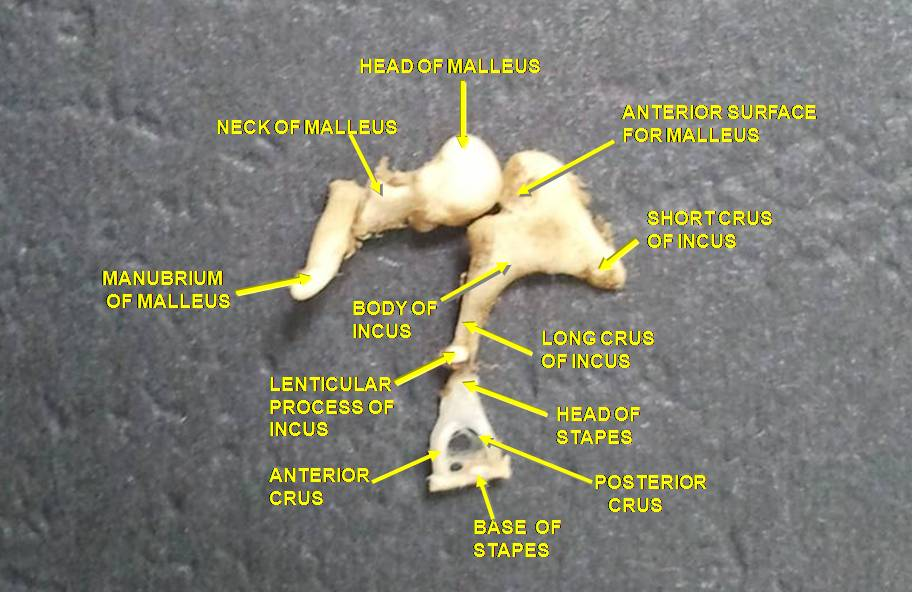
Anatomy of the three ossicles of the human ear

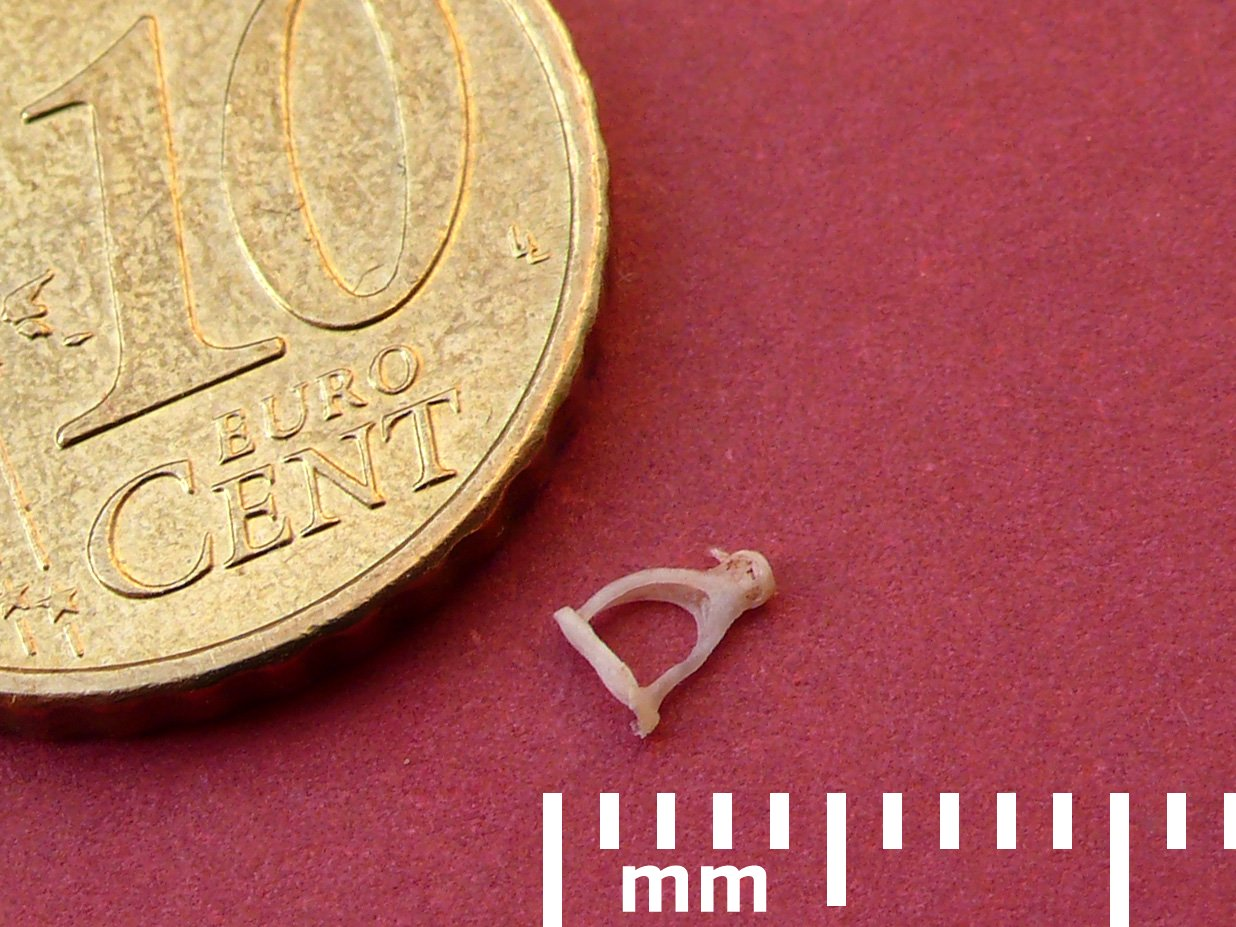
Stapes and 10 cent euro coin

=== Development ===
Studies have shown that ear bones in mammal embryos are attached to the dentary, which is part of the lower jaw. These are ossified portions of cartilage—called Meckel's cartilage—that are attached to the jaw. As the embryo develops, the cartilage hardens to form bone. Later in development, the bone structure breaks loose from the jaw and migrates to the inner ear area. The structure is known as the middle ear, and is made up of the stapes, incus, malleus, and tympanic membrane. These correspond to the columella, quadrate, articular, and angular structures in the amphibian, bird or reptile jaw.

=== Evolution ===
The bones that make up the ossicles did not originally serve the function of hearing. The incus and malleus originally served the role of the jaw joint, while the stapes originally served to brace the skull.

Among amphibians and reptiles (including birds), the role of sound conduction is played by the columella, itself derived from the hyomandibula of fish. The columella is attached to the eardrum via the extracolumella, an ossicle which is typically made of cartilage, but bony in select species.

In frogs and salamanders, another ossicle - the batrachian operculum - is present alongside the columella. Usually made of cartilage, but bony in certain species, the operculum connects the middle ear to the shoulder girdle via a specialised muscle, allowing for sound to be conducted from the ground through the forelimb to the ear. In some salamanders, the columella is absent, and the operculum is the main ossicle.

==== Mammals ====
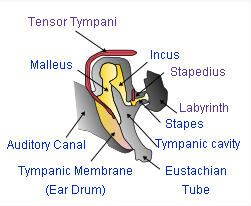
A typical mammalian middle ear: sound makes the tympanum (eardrum) vibrate; 3 small bones, the malleus, incus and stapes, transmit the vibrations to the labyrinth (inner ear), which transforms the vibrations into nerve signals.

The evolution of mammalian auditory ossicles was an evolutionary process that resulted in the formation of the mammalian middle ear, where the three middle ear bones or ossicles, namely the incus, malleus and stapes (a.k.a. "the anvil, hammer, and stirrup"), are a defining characteristic of mammals. The event is well-documented and important academically as a demonstration of transitional forms and exaptation, the re-purposing of existing structures during evolution.

The ossicles are homologous to skull bones present in most other tetrapods, including amphibians, sauropsids (which include extant reptiles and birds), and early synapsids (which include ancestors of mammals). The reptilian quadrate, articular and columella bones are homologs of the mammalian incus, malleus and stapes, respectively. In reptiles (and early synapsids by association), the eardrum is connected to the inner ear via a single bone, the columella, while the upper and lower jaws contain several bones not found in modern mammals. Over the course of mammalian evolution, one bone from the upper jaw (the quadrate) and one from the lower jaw (the articular) lost their function in the jaw articulation and migrated to form the middle ear. The shortened columella connected to these bones to form a kinematic chain of three ossicles, which serve to amplify air-sourced fine vibrations transmitted from the eardrum and facilitate more acute hearing in terrestrial environments.

== Function ==
As sound waves vibrate the tympanic membrane (eardrum), it in turn moves the nearest ossicle, the malleus, to which it is attached. The malleus then transmits the vibrations, via the incus, to the stapes, and so ultimately to the membrane of the fenestra ovalis (oval window), the opening to the vestibule of the inner ear.

Sound traveling through the air is mostly reflected when it comes into contact with a liquid medium; only about 1/30 of the sound energy moving through the air would be transferred into the liquid. This is observed from the abrupt cessation of sound that occurs when the head is submerged underwater. This is because the relative incompressibility of a liquid presents resistance to the force of the sound waves traveling through the air. The ossicles give the eardrum a mechanical advantage via lever action and a reduction in the area of force distribution; the resulting vibrations are stronger but don't move as far. This allows more efficient coupling than if the sound waves were transmitted directly from the outer ear to the oval window. This reduction in the area of force application allows a large enough increase in pressure to transfer most of the sound energy into the liquid. The increased pressure will compress the fluid found in the cochlea and transmit the stimulus. Thus, the lever action of the ossicles changes the vibrations so as to improve the transfer and reception of sound, and is a form of impedance matching.

However, the extent of the movements of the ossicles is controlled (and constricted) by two muscles attached to them (the tensor tympani and the stapedius). It is believed that these muscles can contract to dampen the vibration of the ossicles, in order to protect the inner ear from excessively loud noise (theory 1) and that they give better frequency resolution at higher frequencies by reducing the transmission of low frequencies (theory 2) (see acoustic reflex). These muscles are more highly developed in bats and serve to block outgoing cries of the bats during echolocation.

== Clinical relevance ==
Occasionally the joints between the ossicles become rigid. One condition, otosclerosis, results in the fusing of the stapes to the oval window. This reduces hearing and may be treated surgically using a passive middle ear implant.

== History ==
Some doubt exists as to the discoverers of the auditory ossicles, and several anatomists from the early 16th century have the discovery attributed to them with the two earliest being Alessandro Achillini and Jacopo Berengario da Carpi. Several sources, including Eustachi and Casseri, attribute the discovery of the malleus and incus to the anatomist and philosopher Achillini. The first written description of the malleus and incus was by Berengario da Carpi in his Commentaria super anatomia Mundini (1521), although he only briefly described two bones and noted their theoretical association with the transmission of sound. Niccolo Massa's Liber introductorius anatomiae described the same bones in slightly more detail and likened them both to little hammers. A much more detailed description of the first two ossicles followed in Andreas Vesalius' De humani corporis fabrica in which he devoted a chapter to them. Vesalius was the first to compare the second element of the ossicles to an anvil although he offered the molar as an alternative comparison for its shape. The first published description of the stapes came in Pedro Jimeno's Dialogus de re medica (1549) although it had been previously described in public lectures by Giovanni Filippo Ingrassia at the University of Naples as early as 1546.

== See also ==
- Incudomalleolar joint – Synovial joint between malleus and incus
- Incudostapedial joint – Small joint between the incus and the stapes
- Otolith – Inner-ear structure in vertebrates which detects acceleration
