= Malleus =

Bone of the middle ear

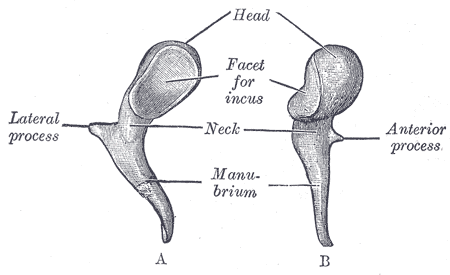
- Left malleus. A. From behind. B. From within.

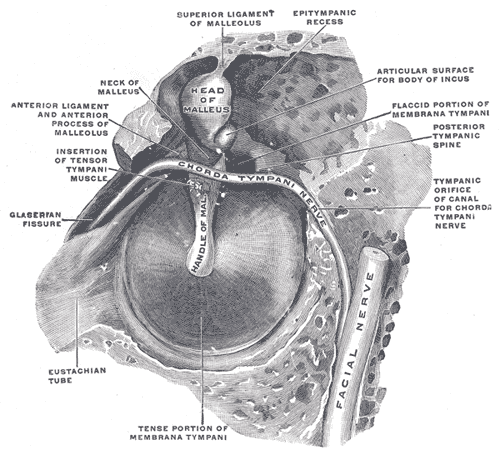
- The right eardrum with the hammer and the chorda tympani, viewed from within, from behind, and from above (malleus visible at center)

Details
- Pronunciation: /ˈmæliəs/
- Precursor: First branchial arch
- Part of: Middle ear
- System: Auditory system

Identifiers
- Latin: malleus
- MeSH: D008307
- TA98: A15.3.02.043
- TA2: 881
- FMA: 52753

The malleus, or hammer, is a hammer-shaped small bone or ossicle of the middle ear. It connects with the incus, and is attached to the inner surface of the eardrum. The word is Latin for 'hammer' or 'mallet'. It transmits the sound vibrations from the eardrum to the incus (anvil).

== Structure ==
The malleus is a bone situated in the middle ear. It is the first of the three ossicles, and attached to the eardrum (tympanic membrane). The head of the malleus is the large protruding section, which attaches to the incus. The head connects to the neck of malleus. The bone continues as the handle (or manubrium) of malleus, which connects to the tympanic membrane. Between the neck and handle of the malleus, lateral and anterior processes emerge from the bone. The bone is oriented so that the head is superior and the handle is inferior.

=== Development ===
Embryologically, the malleus is derived from the first pharyngeal arch along with the incus. In humans it develops from Meckel's cartilage.

== Function ==
The malleus is one of three ossicles in the middle ear which transmit sound from the tympanic membrane (ear drum) to the inner ear. The malleus receives vibrations from the tympanic membrane and transmits this to the incus.

== Clinical significance ==
The malleus may be palpated by surgeons during ear surgery. It may become fixed in place due to surgical complications, causing hearing loss. This may be corrected with further surgery.

== History ==
Several sources attribute the discovery of the malleus to the anatomist and philosopher Alessandro Achillini. The first brief written description of the malleus was by Berengario da Carpi in his Commentaria super anatomia Mundini (1521). Niccolo Massa's Liber introductorius anatomiae described the malleus in slightly more detail and likened both it and the incus to little hammers terming them malleoli.

== Other animals ==
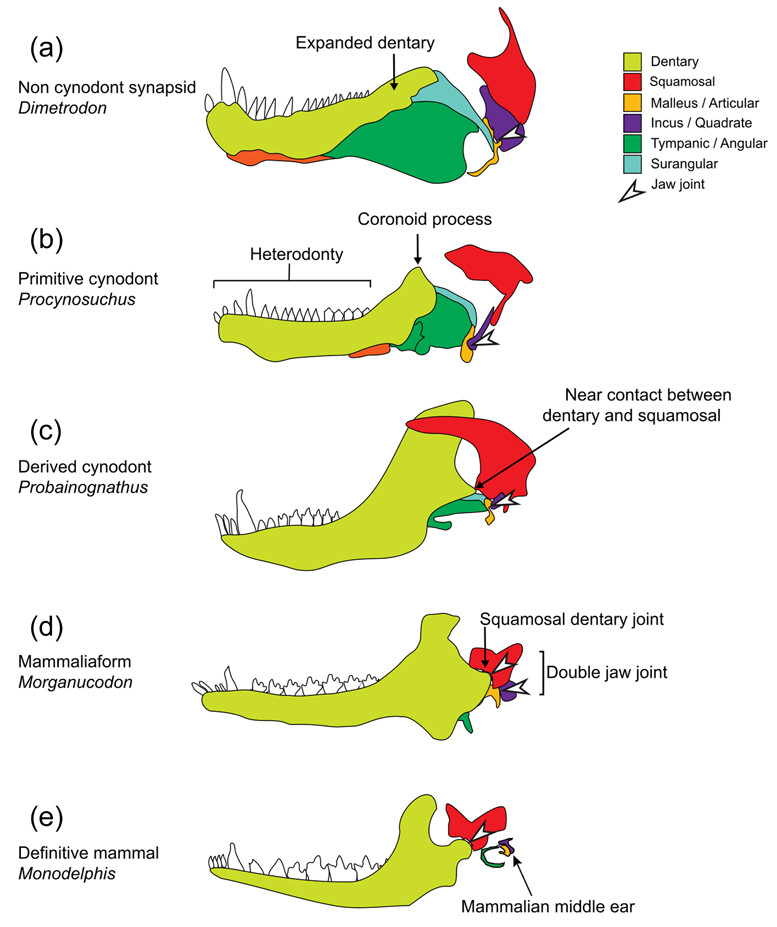
Diagram showing synapsid jaw evolution from early "pelycosaur" synapsids to modern mammals, with the malleus/articular in light orange

The malleus is unique to mammals, and evolved from a lower jaw bone in basal amniotes called the articular, which still forms part of the jaw joint in other vertebrates. The prearticular bone is also incorporated into the malleus.

Transitional fossils record the transformation of the articular and prearticular into the malleus; together with the quadrate (which becomes the incus), the bones shrink and sit in a trough on the medial side of the lower jaw. Following this, the middle ear bones became displaced from the lower jaw but retained a connection via Meckel's cartilage; among living mammals, the connection is severed in adults. The process of separation of the middle ear bones from the jaw is thought to have occurred convergently in monotremes and therians.

The articular in turn is evolutionarily derived from Meckel's cartilage, which forms the lower jaw in chondrichthyans (sharks and rays) and early gnathostomes. Meckel's cartilage is the ventral part of the mandibular arch of the splanchnocranium, meaning that the malleus is an evolutionary descendent of the gill arch.

== Additional images ==
Ossicles

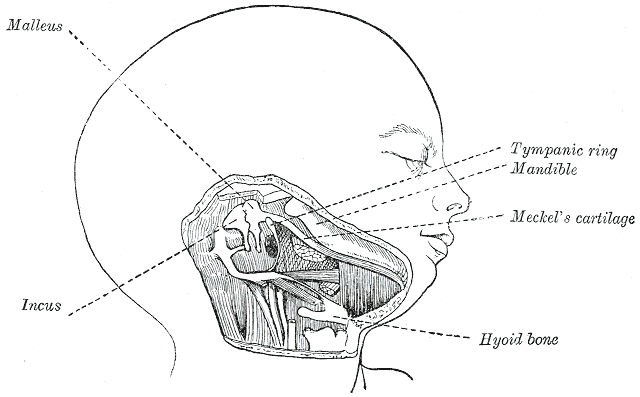
Head and neck of a human embryo eighteen weeks old, with Meckel's cartilage and hyoid bone exposed.

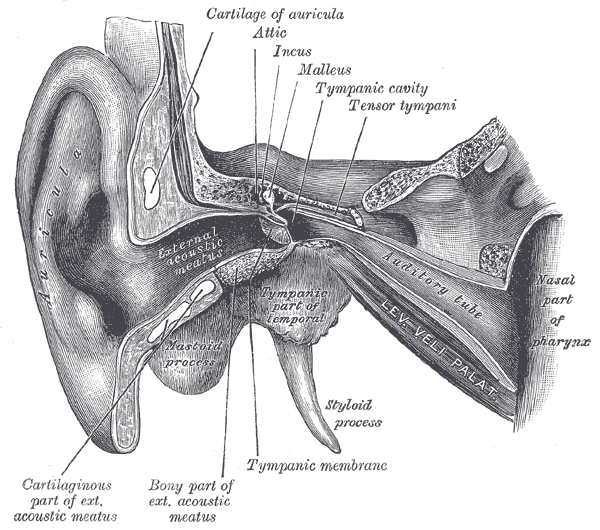
External and middle ear, opened from the front. Right side.

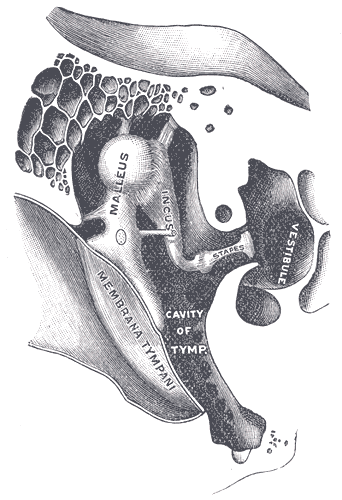
Chain of ossicles and their ligaments, seen from the front in a vertical, transverse section of the tympanum.

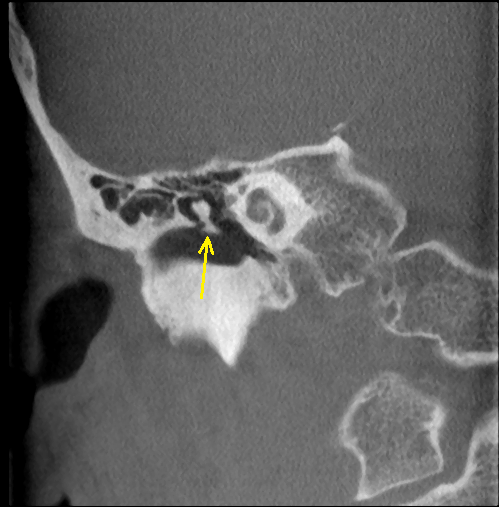
CT image of malleus

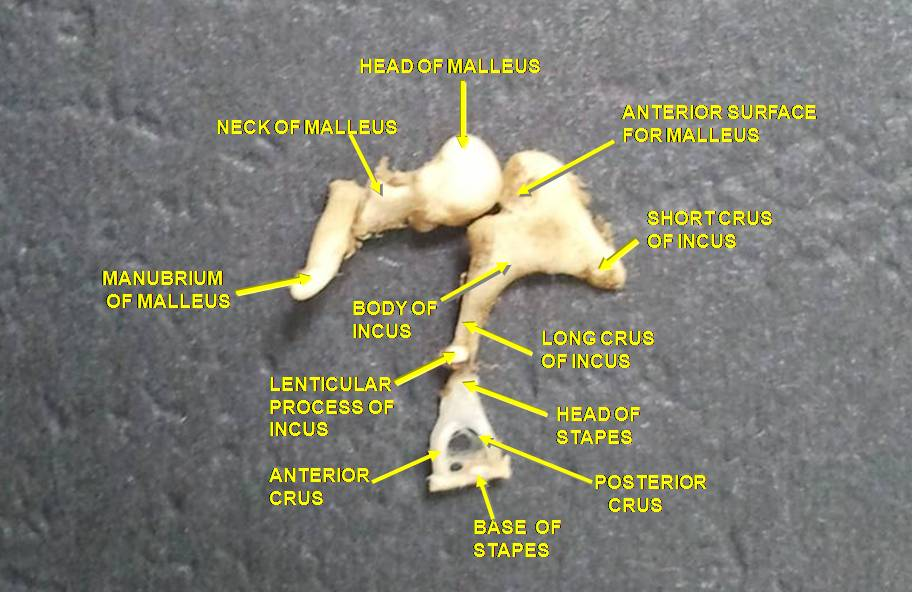
Auditory ossicles. Tympanic cavity. Deep dissection.

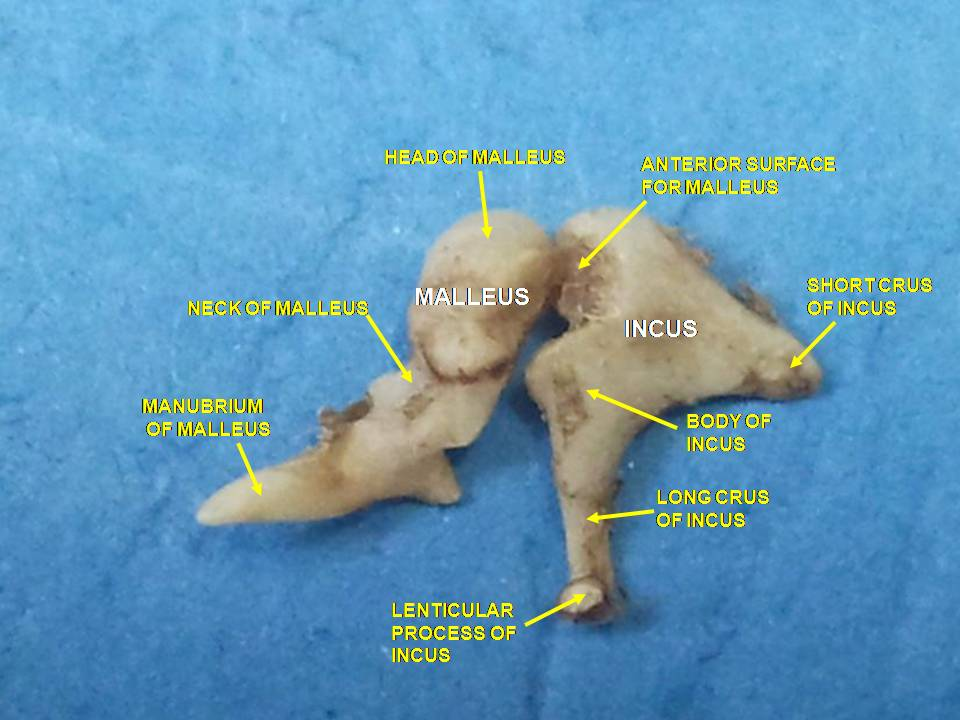
Auditory ossicles. Incus and malleus. Deep dissection.

== See also ==
- Bone terminology
- Evolution of mammalian auditory ossicles
- Ligaments of malleus
- Terms for anatomical location
