= Articular bone =

Skull of early archosauromorph reptile, Langobardisaurus showing the position of the articular on the lower jaw in orange

The articular bone is part of the lower jaw of most vertebrates, including most jawed fish, amphibians, birds and various kinds of reptiles, as well as ancestral mammals.

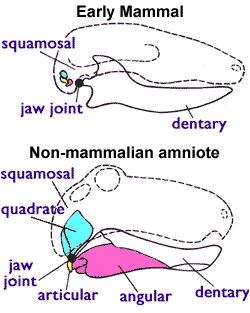
Mammalian and non-mammalian jaws. In the mammal configuration, the quadrate and articular bones are much smaller and form part of the middle ear. Note that in mammals the lower jaw consists of only the dentary bone.

== Anatomy ==
In most vertebrates, the articular bone is connected to two other lower jaw bones, the surangular and the angular. Developmentally, it originates from the embryonic mandibular cartilage. The most caudal portion of the mandibular cartilage ossifies to form the articular bone, while the remainder of the mandibular cartilage either remains cartilaginous or disappears.

=== In snakes ===
In snakes, the articular, surangular, and prearticular bones have fused to form the compound bone. The mandible is suspended from the quadrate bone and articulates at this compound bone.

== Function ==
=== In amphibians and reptiles ===
In most tetrapods, the articular bone forms the lower portion of the jaw joint. The upper jaw articulates at the quadrate bone.

=== In mammals ===
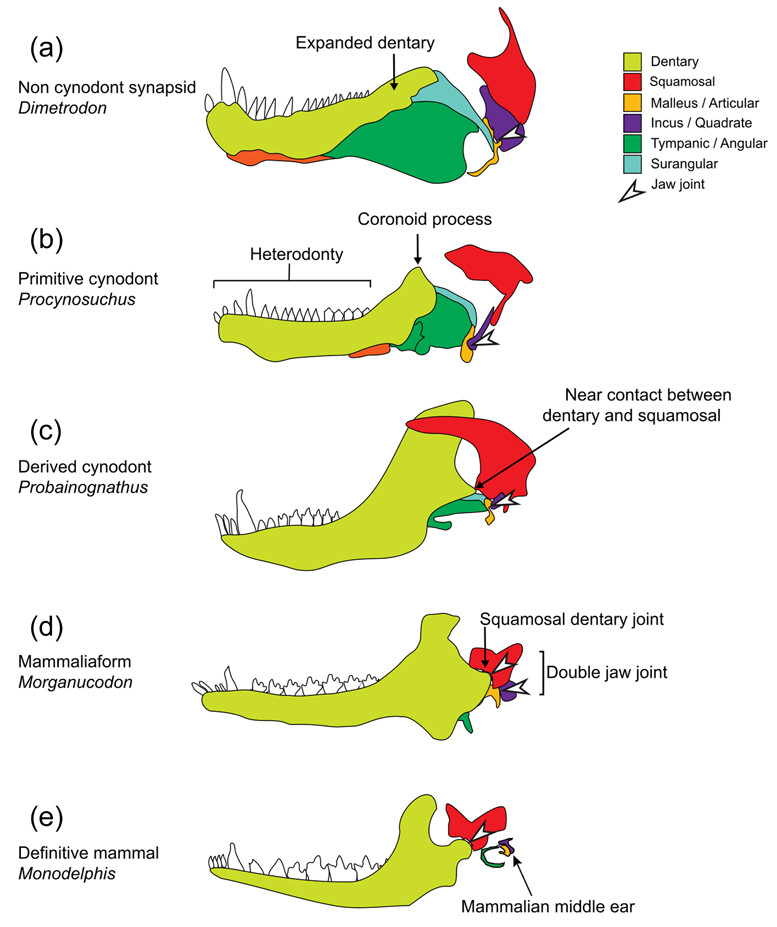
Diagram showing synapsid jaw evolution from early "pelycosaur" synapsids to modern mammals, showing the transformation of the articular into the malleus

In mammals, the articular bone evolves to form the malleus, one of the mammalian ossicles of the middle ear. This is an apomorphy of the mammalian clade, and is used to determine the fossil transition to mammals. It is analogous to, but not homologous to the articular process of the lower jaw.

After the loss of the quadrate-articular joint, the squamosal and dentary bones form the new jaw joint in mammals.

== See also ==
- Evolution of mammalian auditory ossicles
