= Columella (bone) =

Bony structures in the skull that serve the purpose of transmitting sounds

In most reptiles, the columella serves to connect the oval window to the eardrum via the extracolumella.

In the auditory system, the columella (plural columellae), also known as the columella auris or the plectrum, contributes to hearing in amphibians, reptiles and birds. The columella is a thin bone in the interior of the skull and serves the purpose of transmitting sounds from the eardrum, often via a cartilaginous or bony extracolumella. It is an evolutionary homolog of the stapes, one of the auditory ossicles in mammals.

During development, the columella is derived from the dorsal end of the hyoid arch.

== Evolution ==
The evolution of the columella is closely related to the evolution of the jaw joint. It is an ancestral homolog of the stapes, and is derived from the hyomandibular bone of fishes. The hyomandibular likely did not have an auditory function in stem-tetrapods; crossopterygians such as Panderichthys have a short, straight columella that contacts the otic capsule with an immobile joint and does not contact the outer surface of the skull. In these taxa, it is believed to have had a role in structurally supporting the skull.

As the columella is derived from the hyomandibula, many of its functional relationships remain the same. The columella resides in the air-filled tympanic cavity of the middle ear. The footplate, or proximal end of the columella, rests in the oval window. Sound is conducted through the oval window to the interior of the otic capsule. This motion ultimately stimulates sensory cells in the inner ear.

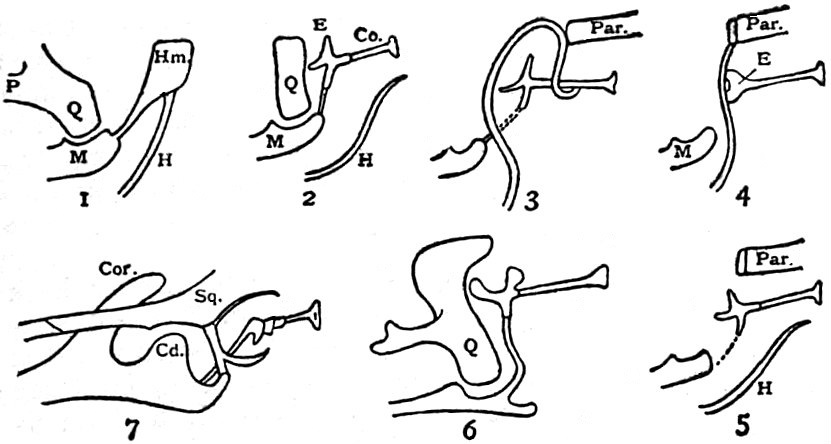
Depiction of the evolution of the ossicles of the ear. The columella (Co) evolves into the stapes in embryonic mammals (7).

In the transition of tetrapods from sea to land, the earliest appearance of functional columella appeared in temnospondyls.

In lissamphibians, the columella is sometimes referred to as the plectrum. In batrachians, the columella is associated with a second ossicle, the operculum, which attaches to the scapula or suprascapula via a muscle and thereby allows for sound conduction from the ground via the forelimb. In some salamanders, the columella is lost entirely, with the operculum taking over the role of hearing.

Crocodilians evolved to lift the head and body off the ground, isolating the head from ground vibrations. Under selective pressure to detect airborne sound vibrations, the columella in crocodilians has become more slender with reduced mass.

Birds and modern crocodilians have evolved a trifurcated columella, which forms a Y-shaped support structure on the surface of the tympanic membrane. In birds, this is thought to increase the surface area of the columellar footplate, thus lowering the threshold of hearing and improving the detection of airborne sound waves.

In many reptile and amphibian species, the columella articulates with the extracolumella, a (generally cartilaginous) element that connects it to the eardrum.

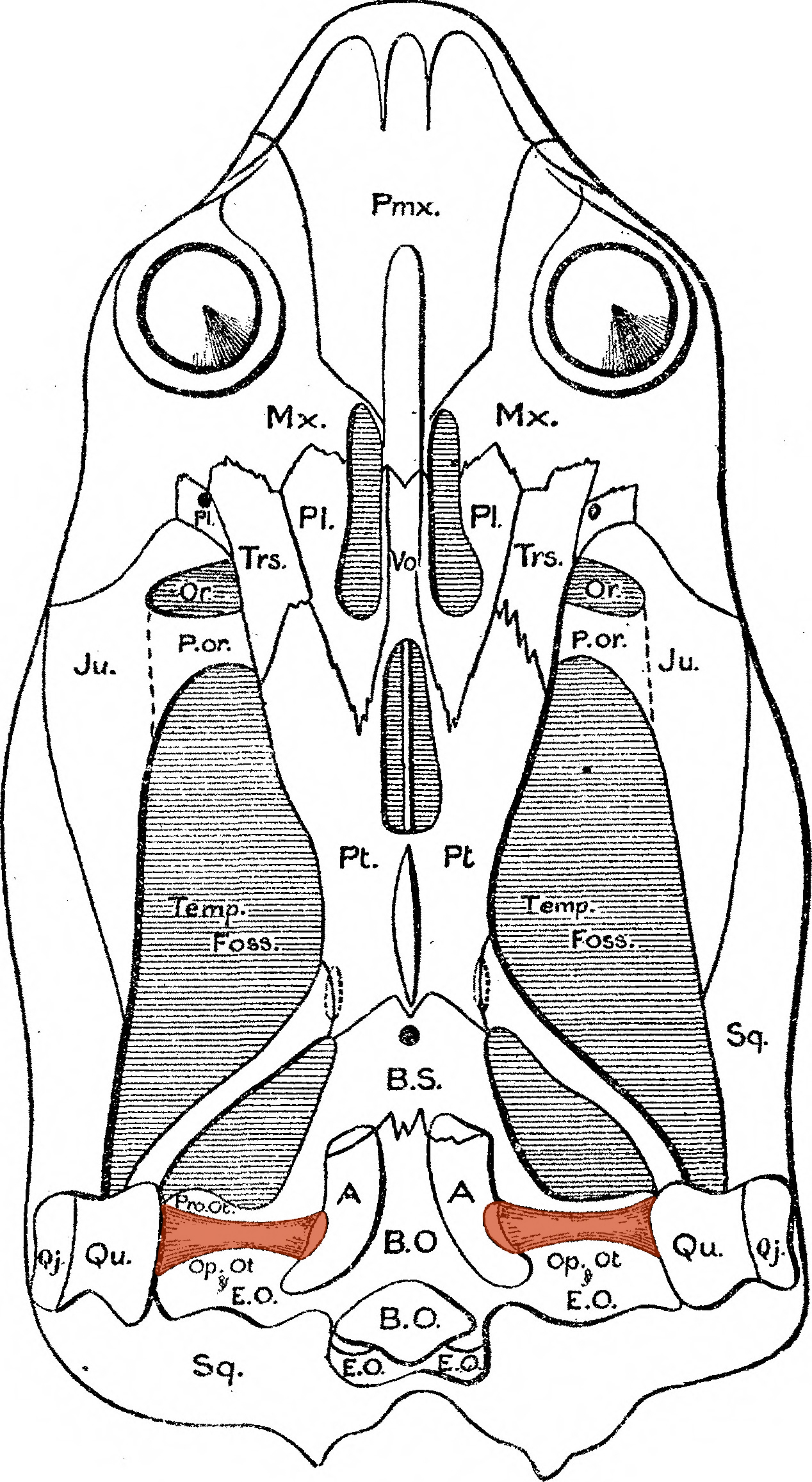
Columella (highlighted) in the skull of the extinct therapsid Dicynodon.

== Anatomy in reptiles ==
In reptiles, the columella function to transduce sound through the middle ear as part of the auditory pathway. The columella is relatively straight and moves in a piston-like motion in response to vibration. Due to the rigid bony structure, the columella primarily responds to low-frequency vibrations transmitted through the ground.

=== Crocodilians ===
In crocodilians, the columella arises from a proximal and a distal component which develop into the columella and extracolumella, respectively. It is typically trifurcated, with three finger-like projections supporting it against the tympanic membrane. The extracolumella remains cartilaginous while the columella ossifies during development. The connection between the columella and extracolumella remains flexible over the animal's lifetime.

=== Snakes ===
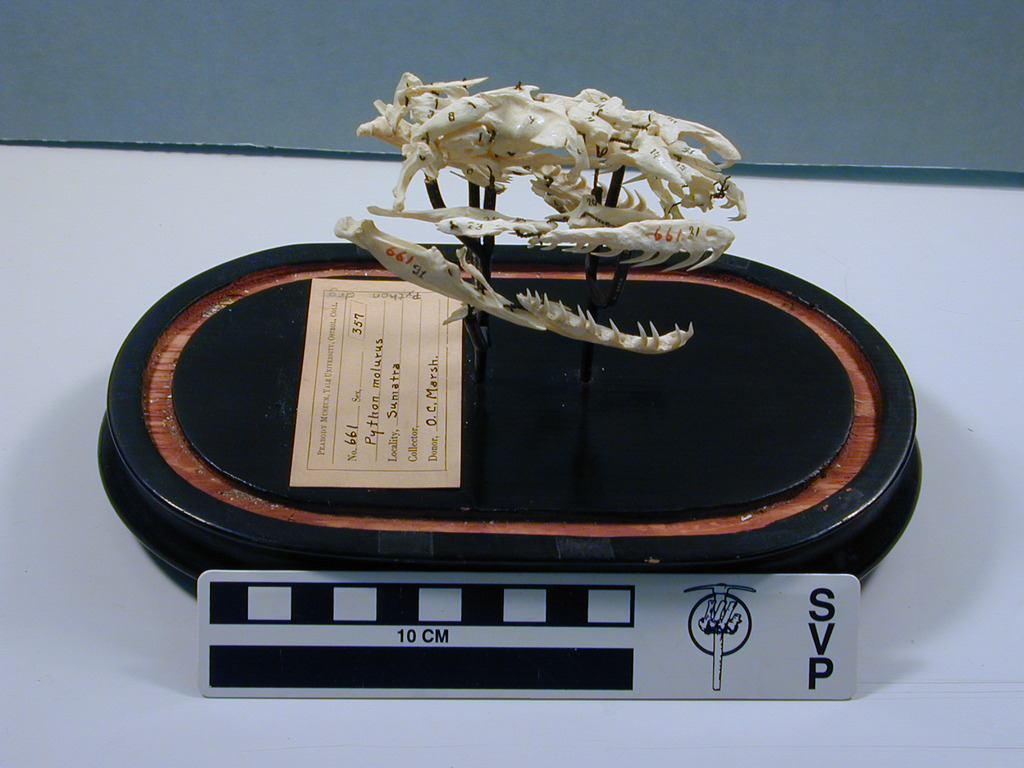
Mounted skull of a python with disarticulated upper and lower jaw joints. In snakes, the columella would be attached directly to the quadrate bone (c).

Snakes have lost a tympanic membrane, and hence a distal attachment for the columella. The columella is instead connected to the quadrate bone of the jaw. Thus, snakes are able to detect and localize ground vibrations through the lower jaw, rather than the sides of the head.

=== Birds ===
In birds, the columella is anchored to the conical tympanic membrane at an acute angle, rather than a 90-degree angle relative to the plane of the tympanic membrane. This is thought to provide a lever advantage in conducting airborne sound from the distal to the proximal end of the columella.

=== Development in chickens ===
In chick embryos, the primordial columella arises from a mesenchymal condensation. Chondrification of the columella occurs earlier than the extracolumella. During endochondral ossification, the columella ossifies from two origins of periosteum: the shaft and the footplate.

== Homology in mammals ==
Within mammals and other synapsids the columella has evolved into the stapes, a homologous bone within the newly evolved middle ear. As the tympanic cavity evolved to reduce in size, the columella shortened in length. The stirrup-shaped articular processes of the columella inspired a new name for this auditory ossicle, the stapes. The auditory ossicles continue to function in conducting transmitting sound through the auditory pathway; however, they have lost their function in conducting low frequency ground vibrations.

Later-arising reptiles with columellae likely evolved stronger limbs and a more crawling posture, which removed the body from the ground and prevented the transmission of ground-conducted sounds. The skin over the ear evolved into the eardrum, which allowed for the detection of high-frequency airborne vibrations. In mammals, the newly specialized ossicles function to transduce and amplify these vibrations along the auditory pathway.

=== Artificial columella ===
In humans, artificially made columellae may be produced as autografts from cortical bone. These prostheses are used as replacements for the stapes in ear surgery to correct for hearing problems (such as cholesteatoma or re-perforation).
