= Robert Wiedersheim =

German anatomist and biologist

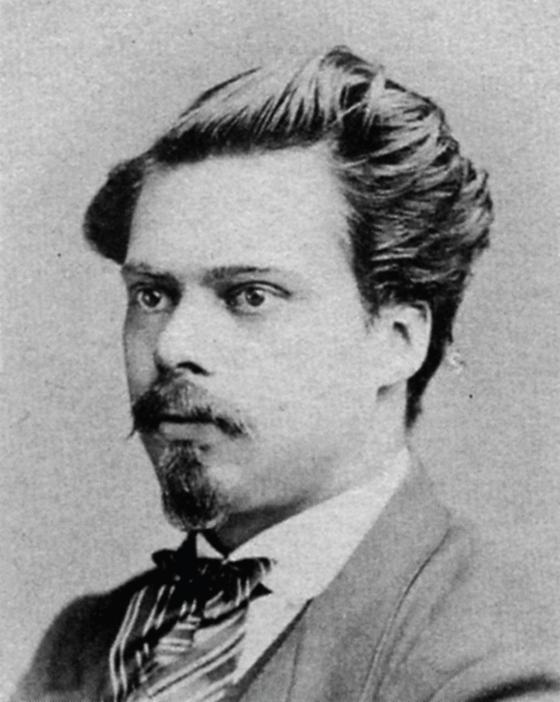
- The young Robert Ernst Eduard Wiedersheim, probably in early 1874 by Alfredo Noack in Genoa
- Born: 21 April 1848; Nürtingen, Baden-Württemberg
- Died: 12 July 1923 (aged 75); Bad Schachen, Bavaria
- Education: Lausanne, Tübingen, Würzburg, Freiburg
- Known for: The Structure of Man: an Index to His Past History
- Scientific career
- Fields: Human anatomy
- Institutions: University of Freiburg

Robert Ernst Eduard Wiedersheim (21 April 1848 – 12 July 1923) was a German anatomist who is famous for publishing a list of 86 "vestigial organs" in his book The Structure of Man: An Index to His Past History.

== Biography ==
Wiedersheim's father was Eduard Friedrich Wiedersheim (1819–1882), a medical doctor and naturalist. His mother, Bertha Friederike Wiedersheim (née Otto, 1825–1848) died a few days after his birth. During his school years Wiedersheim showed an interest in botany and zoology. However, he was not a good student and barely passed the final examination.

Initially commencing a science degree at Lausanne in 1868 Wiedersheim switched after one semester to a medical degree at Tübingen, following his father's wishes. He studied at Tübingen from 1868 to 1870 under Franz Leydig. In 1871 he moved his studies to Würzburg and the following year to Freiburg. In 1872 Wiedersheim finished a doctoral thesis on the finer structural relations of the glands in the gizzard of birds, a subject suggested to him by Carl Hasse while in Würzburg.

In 1873 Wiedersheim married Mathilde (Tilla) Sophie Gruber with whom he had one son, Walter Wiedersheim.

After finishing his studies Wiedersheim returned to Würzburg where he worked as an assistant to Albert von Koelliker until 1876. In 1876 he became an associate professor of anatomy at the Albert Ludwigs University of Freiburg where he taught until 1918. He became an expert in comparative anatomy and published a number of relevant textbooks. He also collected early photographs and documents of scientists of his day. In 1883 Wiedersheim became a full professor of anatomy and succeeded Alexander Ecker as the director of Freiburg's Institute of Anatomy and Comparative Anatomy.

== Notable works ==
=== The anatomy of the frog ===
At Freiburg Wiedersheim took part in a lengthy ongoing collaboration with Alexander Ecker and Ernst Gaupp to produce a comprehensive, illustrated atlas of anatomy for the European edible frog Rana esculenta. This collaboration took place over a 40-year period with several publications between 1864 and 1904 under the title Die Anatomie des Frosches and the resulting work is still considered a standard reference on anuran anatomy. A translation by George Haslam of the first two volumes of Die Anatomie des Frosches, including considerable new material, was published under the title The anatomy of the frog in 1889.

=== Comparative anatomy of vertebrates ===
In 1882 Wiedersheim published a book entitled Lehrbuch der vergleichende Anatomie der Wirbelthiere or Elements of the comparative anatomy of vertebrates. This book and its subsequent edition proved very popular and a shorter outline version was published, this was also popular and went through several editions, gaining in size with each edition. In 1902 this outline version superseded the original and was published as Vergleichende Anatomie der Wirbelthiere or Comparative anatomy of vertebrates. English editions under both titles were translated by W.N. Parker an anatomist at University College of South Wales, now Cardiff University.

=== The Structure of Man ===
The structure of Man: An Index to His Past History deals with various anatomical elements of the human body and attempts to frame them in an evolutionary context with other vertebrates. Wiedersheim himself suggests in the introduction that this work is in the same vein as Thomas Huxley's earlier Evidence as to man's place in nature. The structure of Man began as a much shorter academic treatise, Der Bau der Menschen, produced in 1887 with a small intended circulation. In its original form it lacked any illustrations and gave only a brief overview of many of its topics. Thanks to a high degree of interest and correspondence regarding the work Wiedersheim decided to publish a revised and expanded version. The German second edition was published in 1893 with an English translation by Henry and Matilda Bernard following in 1895.

As part of the book Wiedersheim included a list of the organs discussed in the text which might be considered vestigial. He writes, "comparative morphology points not only to the essentially similar plan of organization of the bodies of all vertebrates, ... but also to the occurrence in them of certain organs, or parts of organs, now known as 'vestigial.' "By such organs are meant those which were formerly of greater physiological significance than at present."

He picked up on Darwin's concept of "rudimentary" organs such as listed in The Descent of Man: the muscles of the ear, wisdom teeth, the appendix, the coccyx (tail bone), body hair, and the semilunar fold in the corner of the eye. The list, however, contains structures which today are known to be essential, and thus represents a historical record of the physiologic understanding of the day.

Evolutionists have used the credited examples of this list as an argument for evolution as they are evolutionary leftovers, of little use to the current organism. Creationists, on the other hand, have used the discredited examples as an argument against evolution. There is no "scientific" proof, they say, of the uselessness of a particular organ.

A vestige is not necessarily a completely useless organ. Although defined as "useless" in popular media, a vestige as defined in evolutionary biology may still have some use, but the use has since diminished. This definition is consistent with Wiedersheim, who said that vestigial organs are "wholly or in part functionless" (Wiedersheim 1893, p. 200) and have "lost their original physiological significance" (p. 205).

Although Wiedersheim's originally published list contains 86 items, later interpretations enlarged his list to 180 vestiges. The zoologist Horatio Newman said in a written statement read into evidence in the Scopes Trial that "There are, according to Wiedersheim, no less than 180 vestigial structures in the human body, sufficient to make of a man a veritable walking museum of antiquities."

== Structures included in Wiedersheim's list of 86 vestigial organs ==
1. Os coccygis. Cauda humana.
2. Superfluous embryonic notochord and associated somites.
3. Embryonic cervical, lumbar, and sacral ribs.
4. The thirteenth rib of the adult.
5. The seventh cervical rib in the adult.
6. The interarticular cartilage of the sterno-clavicular joint (probable vestige of the episternal apparatus).
7. Ossa supra-sternalia.
8. Certain centres of ossification in the manubrium sterni.
9. The branchial clefts (for the most part) and branchial ridges.
10. Processus styloideus ossis temporis, and the ligamentum stylohyoideum.
11. Anterior cornua of the hyoid, for the greater part.
12. Foramen caecum of the tongue.
13. Processus gracilis of the malleus.
14. Post-frontal bone (?)
15. Ossa interparietalia (and ? preinterparietalia).
16. Processus paramastoideus of exoccipital.
17. Torus occipitalis.
18. Processus frontalis of the temporal.
19. Processus coracoideus [meta- and epi-coracoid bones].
20. Os centrale carpi.
21. Processus supracondyloideus humeri.
22. Trochanter tertius femoris.
23. The phalanges of the fifth toe, and less conspicuously of the third and fourth toes.
24. Muscles of the pinna and the Musculus occipitalis. L
25. M. transversus nuchae. L. --
26. Facial muscles transformed into tendinous expansions.
27. Mm. plantaris and palmaris longus, when completely tendinous.
28. M. ischio femoralis.
29. The caudal muscles.
30. M. epitrochleo-anconaeus.
31. M. latissimo-condyloideus.
32. M. transversus thoracis (triangularis sterni).
33. M. palmaris brevis.
34. The transition bundles between the trapezius and the sterno- cleido-mastoideus.
35. M. levator claviculae.
36. M. rectus thoracis.
37. M. cremaster.
38. The primitive hairy covering or lanugo.
39. Vestiges of vibrissae
40. The vertex coccygeus, the foveola and glabella coccygea.
41. Certain vortices of hair on the breast.
42. Nipples in men.
43. Supernumerary mammary glands in women.
44. Alleged vestiges of mammary pouches [?]
45. Supernumerary olfactory ridges.
46. Jacobson's organ, and ductus naso-palatinus.
47. Papilla palatina and foliata.
48. Plica semilunaris of the eye.
49. Vasa hyaloidse (Cloquet's canal) of the embryo – the choroidal fissure.
50. Lachrymal glands, in part.
51. The epicanthus.
52. M. orbitalis.
53. Certain varieties of the pinna of the ear, i.e. Darwin's tubercle.
54. The filum terminale of the spinal cord.
55. Glandula pinealis and parietal organ.
56. The parieto-occipital fissure of the brain [doubtful].
57. The obex, ponticulus, ligula, taeniae medullares, and velum medullare anterius and posterius, of the brain.
58. The hypophysis cerebri (pituitary body).
59. The dorsal roots and ganglia of the hypoglossus nerve.
60. The rami recurrentes of certain cranial nerves.
61. Certain elements of the brachial and lumbo-sacral plexuses.
62. The coccygeal nerve.
63. The glandula coccygea.
64. Palatal ridges.
65. The sublingua.
66. The formation of rudimentary dental papillae before the sinking of the dental ridge.
67. The Wisdom teeth
68. The occurrence of a third premolar (reversionary).
69. The occurrence of a fourth molar (reversionary).
70. The vestiges of a third dentition.
71. The ciliated epithelium of the embryonic oesophagus.
72. Bursa sub- and prehyoidea (ductus thyroglossus).
73. Musculi broncho-oesophagei.
74. The appendix vermiformis.
75. Ventricle of the larynx (Morgagni's pouch).
76. Lobus subpericardiacus of the lung (reversionary).
77. Certain Valves of the veins.
78. Certain structures of a vestigial nature in the heart.
79. Arteria sacralis media.
80. Arteria ischiadica.
81. Superficial plantar arterial arch of the foot.
82. The vena cava superior sinistra.
83. Venae cardinales posteriores, and ductus Cuvieri.
84. Vestiges (in the female) of the mesonephric system, and (in the male) of the Müllerian ducts.
85. Conus inguinalis, and ligamentum inguinale.
86. The area scroti.

== Legacy ==
Robert Wiedersheim is commemorated in the scientific name of a species of chameleon, Trioceros wiedersheimi.

== See also ==
- Human vestigiality
- Vestigial organs
