= Vestigial response =

Response that has lost its original function

A vestigial response or vestigial reflex in a species is a response that has lost its original function. In humans, vestigial responses include ear perking, goose bumps and the hypnic jerk.

== In humans ==
=== Ear perking ===
It has been observed that some people have slight protrusions on the outer ear (also known as the auricle). These protrusions tend towards the top of the auricle. This has been tagged and coined Darwin's tubercle of the auricle. This phenomenon agrees with the accepted scientific explanation: the incidence of tubercles of the auricle among humans, are vestigial structures testifying to our evolutionary past. They are a throwback to the pointed ears of many mammals and just one more vestigial trace of human evolutionary history.

The focus on this part of the human anatomy has finally been followed by a much later observation testifying to our evolutionary past. The subsequent observation concerns an automatic ear-perking response seen, for example, in dogs when startled by a sudden noise. This response, though faint, fleeting and hardly discernible in humans nonetheless clearly manifests itself. This phenomenon is an automatic-response mechanism that activates even before a human becomes consciously aware that a startling, unexpected or unknown sound has been "heard".

That this vestigial response occurs even before becoming consciously aware of a startling noise would explain why the function of ear-perking had evolved in animals. The mechanism serves to give a split-second advantage to a startled animal – possibly an animal being stalked and hunted. The evolutionary advantage of the ear-perking response could spell the difference between life and death. The perking response serves to gather and focus that much more audible information that is fed into the brain and on its way to being analyzed even before the animal actually becomes aware of the sound. This fraction-of-a-second advantage would explain the evolutionary selection for this response.

=== Goose bumps ===
The pilomotor reflex, more commonly known as goose bumps, was originally a reflex that assured the raising of fur for additional insulation against cold. When scared, this response also made the frightened animal seem bigger and a more formidable enemy.

=== Hypnic jerk ===
The sudden startled arm-jerking response sometimes experienced when on the verge of sleeping is known as the hypnic jerk.

The evolutionary explanation for the existence of the hypnic jerk is unclear, but a possibility is that it is a vestigial reflex humans evolved when they usually slept in trees. Experiencing a hypnic jerk prior to falling asleep may have been selected so that the individual would be able to readjust their sleeping position in the tree with a branch-grabbing response to avoid falling, much like how orangutans grasp upper branches of trees while sleeping.

== See also ==
- Exaptation
- Human vestigiality
