= Supracondylar process of the humerus =

Bony projection from the humerus

Supracondylar process
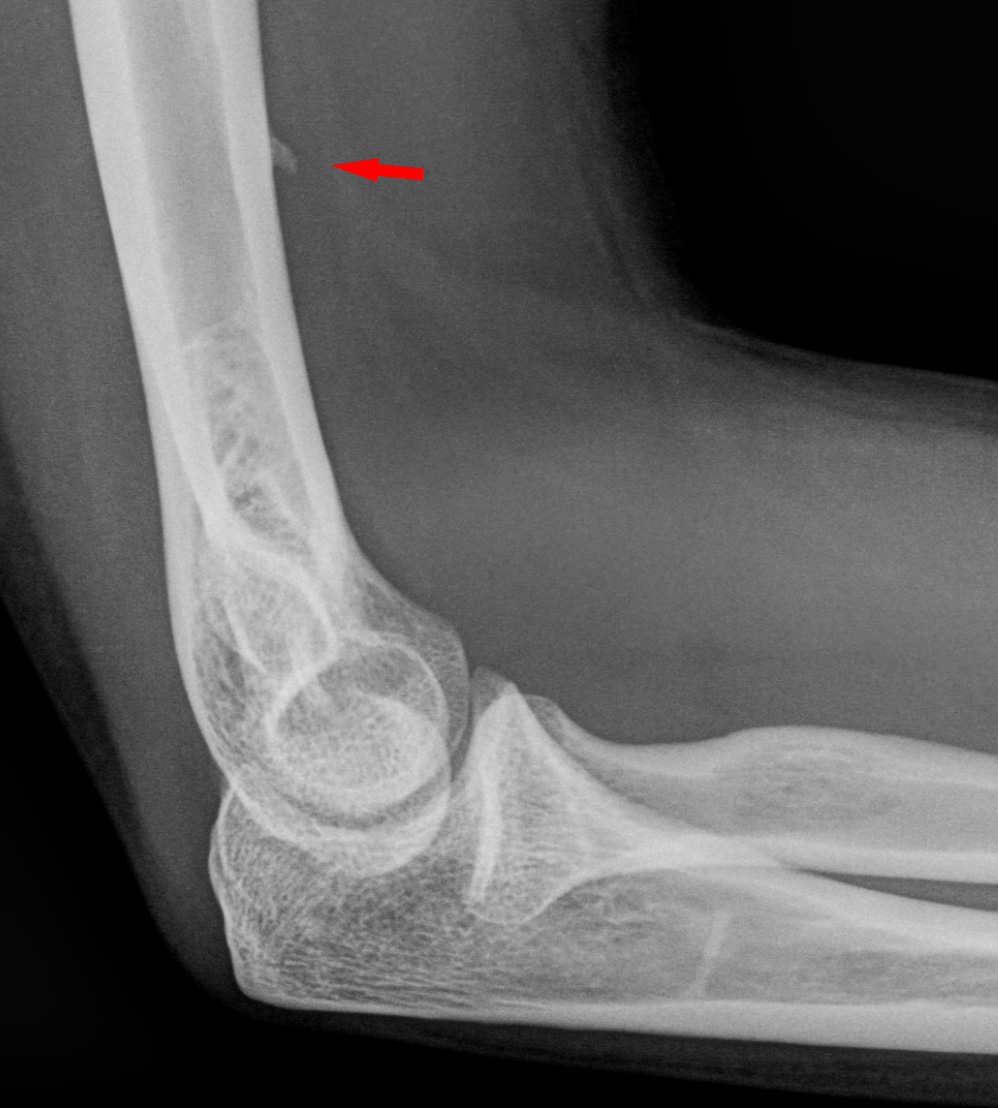
- Small supracondylar process seen on a lateral radiograph of the elbow

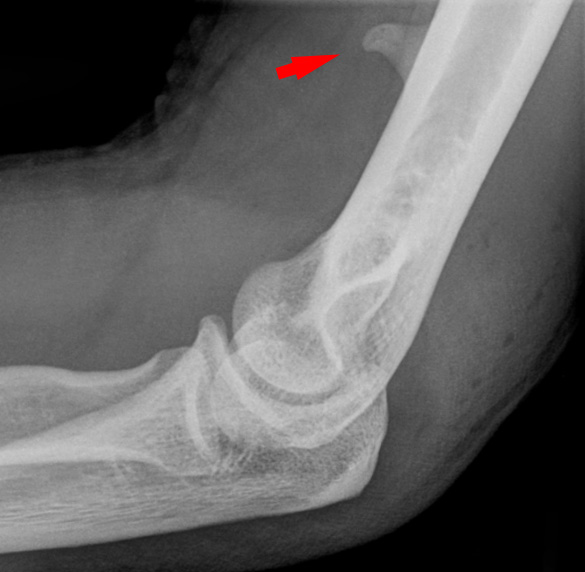
- Larger supracondylar process seen on a lateral radiograph of the elbow

Identifiers
- TA98: A02.4.04.017
- TA2: 1200
- FMA: 75815

The supracondylar process of the humerus (also known as an avian spur) is a variant bony projection on the anteromedial aspect of the upper arm bone (humerus), about 5–6 cm above the medial epicondyle. It is directed downward, forward and medially pointing to the medial epicondyle. A fibrous band, Struthers ligament, may connect this process to the medial epicondyle. This variation has a prevalence of 0.68% and is significantly more common in women than in men.

== Clinical significance ==
Supracondylar processes are usually asymptomatic, but may be palpable as a mass on the upper arm. They are most commonly found as an incidental finding on radiographs made for other reasons, but occasionally isolated fractures of the process itself may lead to its discovery. Rarely, presence of the process and a connecting ligament may lead to compression of the brachial artery and the median nerve, leading to pain, paresthesia, and/or ischemia.

== Other animals ==
The supracondylar process is a vestigial remnant of the supracondylar foramen or epitrochlear foramen found in other vertebrates including cats, climbing mammals and lower primates.

== Bibliography ==
- Subasi M, Kesemenli C, Necmioglu S, Kapukaya A, Demirtas M (2002). "Supracondylar process of the humerus" (PDF). Acta Orthop Belg. 68 (1): 72–5. PMID 11915463.
