= Karl Bogislaus Reichert =

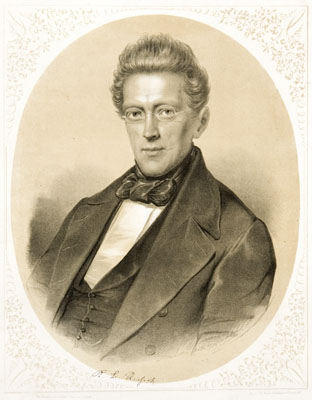
Karl Bogislaus Reichert; lithograph by Georg Friedrich Schlater

Karl Bogislaus Reichert (20 December 1811 – 21 December 1883) was a German anatomist, embryologist and histologist. He is remembered for his work in embryology, and for his pioneer research in cell theory. Reichard created the Reichert–Gaupp theory together with Ernst Gaupp, concerning the origin of mammalian ossicles of the ear.

His name is lent to the eponymous "Reichert's cartilage", described as a cartilaginous structure in the second branchial arch from which develop the temporal styloid processes, the stylohyoid ligaments, and the lesser cornua of the hyoid bone.

== Biography ==
Reichert was born in Rastenburg (Kętrzyn), East Prussia. From 1831, he studied at the University of Konigsberg, where he was a student of embryologist Karl Ernst Baer, then continued his education at the University of Berlin under Friedrich Schlemm and Johannes Peter Müller. In 1836, he received his doctorate with a dissertation on the gill arches of vertebrate embryos. Afterwards, he worked as an intern at the Charité, and from 1839 to 1843, served as an assistant and prosector at the University of Berlin.

In 1843 he attained the chair of anatomy at the Imperial University of Dorpat, and ten years later, succeeded Karl Theodor Ernst von Siebold as professor of physiology at the University of Breslau. In 1858 he returned to Berlin as chair of anatomy, where he succeeded his former mentor, Johannes Peter Müller.

Reichert died in Berlin.

== Written works ==
- De embryonum arcubus sic dictis branchialibus. Berlin, 1836 – On the so-called branchial arches of embryos.
- "Ueber die Visceralbogen der Wirbelthiere im Allgemeinen und deren Metamorphosen bei den Vögeln und Säugethieren". Archiv für Anatomie, Physiologie und wissenschaftliche Medicin: 120–222, 1837 – On the visceral arch of vertebrates in general and its metamorphosis in birds and mammals.
- Das Entwicklungsleben im Wirbelthierreiche. 1840, Berlin – Development of life in vertebrates.
- Beiträge zur Kenntniss des Zustandes der heutigen Entwicklungsgeschichte. 1843, Berlin – Contributions to the knowledge on the state of present-day developmental history.
- Der Bau des menschlichen Gehirns. 1859–1861, Leipzig – Construction of the human brain.

== See also ==
- Emil du Bois-Reymond
