= Ernst Gaupp =

German anatomist

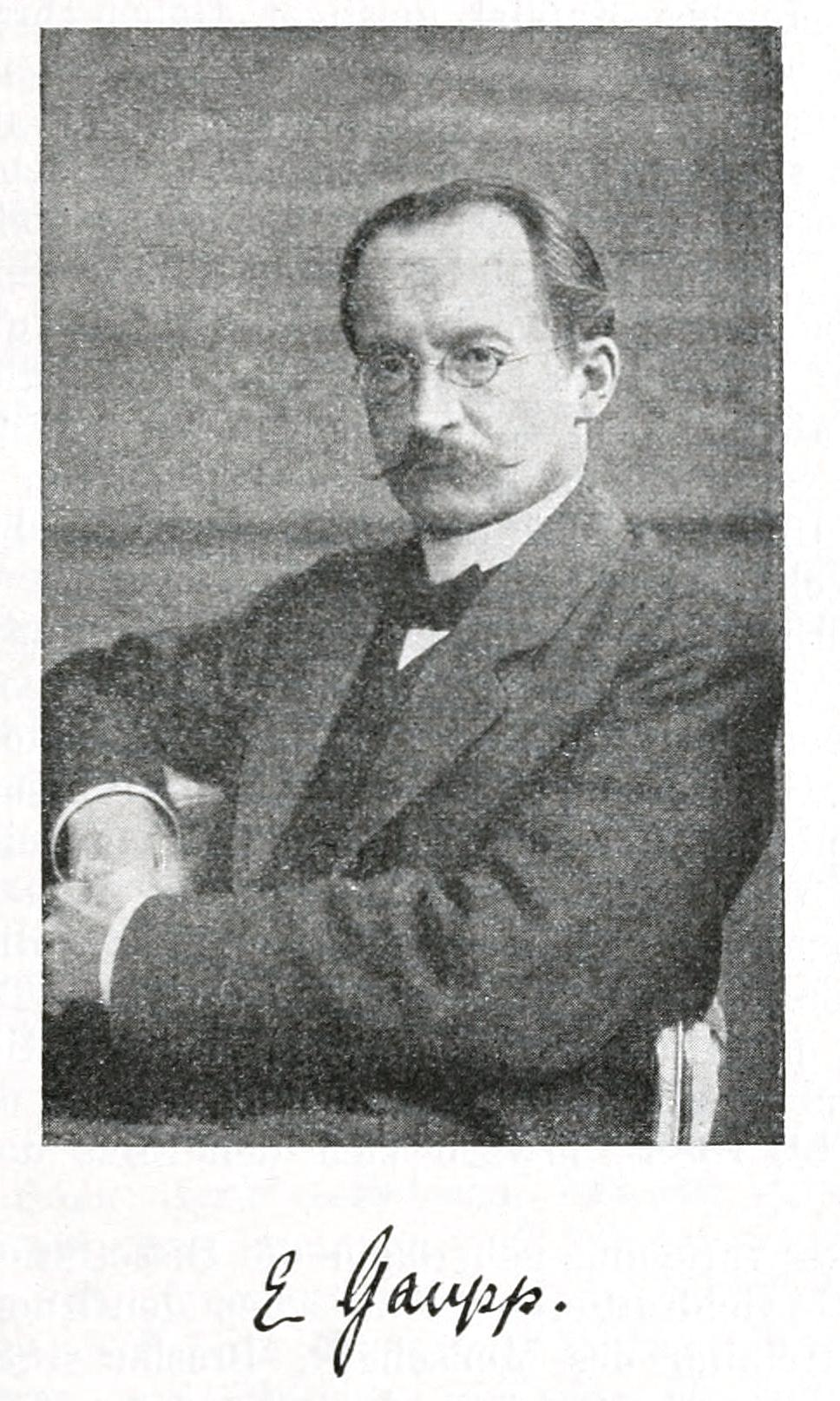
Ernst Gaupp (1865-1916)

Ernst Wilhelm Theodor Gaupp (13 July 1865 – 23 November 1916) was a German anatomist from Beuthen in Upper Silesia (today Bytom, Poland).

He studied natural sciences and medicine in Jena, Königsberg and Breslau, where he received his doctorate in 1889. Afterwards he worked as an anatomist in Freiburg im Breisgau, Königsberg and Breslau (1915).

Gaupp is best remembered for his research involving the morphological development of the cranium in vertebrates. He is credited for establishing the basis and methodology for modern investigations regarding the morphology and morphogenesis of crania. With Karl Bogislaus Reichert (1811-1883), he was co-architect of the Reichert–Gaupp theory involving the origin of mammalian ossicles of the ear.

== Selected writings ==
- Zur Kenntnis des Primordial-Craniums der Amphibien und Reptilien. (Regarding the primordial cranium of amphibians and reptiles) In: Verh. Anat. Ges. 5: 114–120, 1891.
- A. Ecker's und R. Wiedersheim's Anatomie des Frosches, Auf Grund eigener Untersuchungen durchaus neu bearbeitet (Alexander Ecker's and Robert Wiedersheim's Anatomy of Frogs, a new edition by Ernst Gaupp); 2 and 3 Aufl. 1896, 1904.
- Alte Probleme und neuere Arbeiten ueber den Wirbeltierschaedel (Old problems and new research on the vertebrate cranium). In: Erg. Anat. Entw. 10: 847–1001, 1900.
- Die Reichertsche Theorie, Hammer-, Amboss- und Kieferfrage. (The Reichert theory, hammer-, anvil- and jaw question) In: Arch. Anat. Suppl. 1912: 1–416
- August Weismann, sein Leben und sein Werk edited by Eugen Fischer (August Weismann, his life and work) 1917.
