= Accessory abducens nucleus =

Neuron cluster of the pons

Identifiers
- NeuroLex ID: nlx_144454

Accessory abducens nucleus is a small cluster of neurons in the pontine reticular formation of the rat and rabbit.

In the rabbit, motoneurons that are involved in the nictitating membrane response are found in the accessory abducens nucleus.

Crosby et al. (1962) questioned whether, in the human, it exists independently of the accessory facial nucleus.
