= Emil du Bois-Reymond =

German physician and physiologist (1818–1896)

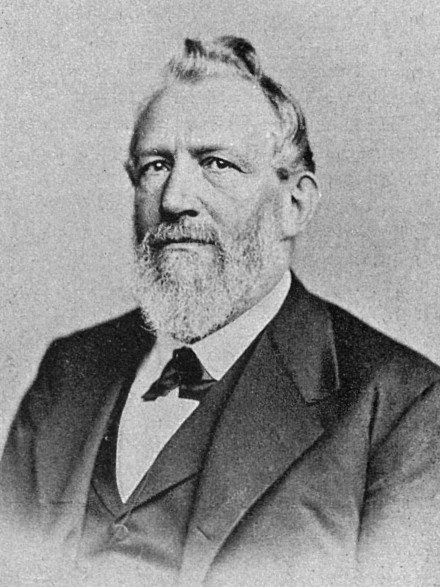
- Born: Emil Heinrich du Bois-Reymond; 7 November 1818; Berlin, Kingdom of Prussia
- Died: 26 December 1896 (aged 78); Berlin, German Empire
- Education: University of Berlin
- Known for: Nerve action potential
- Spouse(s): Jeannette du Bois-Reymond, née Claude
- Children: 9
- Scientific career
- Fields: Physiology; Electrophysiology
- Doctoral advisor: Johannes Peter Müller
- Other academic advisors: Karl Bogislaus Reichert, Heinrich Wilhelm Dove, Gustav Magnus
- Notable students: William James

Emil Heinrich du Bois-Reymond (7 November 1818 – 26 December 1896) was a German physiologist, the co-discoverer of nerve action potential, and the developer of experimental electrophysiology. His lectures on science and culture earned him great esteem during the latter half of the 19th century.

== Life ==
Du Bois-Reymond was born in Berlin and spent his life there. His father was a poor immigrant from Neuchâtel, and his mother was a Berliner of prominent Huguenot origin. Emil had two sisters and two brothers, of whom one, Paul (2 December 1831 – 7 April 1889), became a distinguished mathematician.

Educated first at the French College in Berlin, du Bois-Reymond enrolled in the University of Berlin in 1838. He seems to have been uncertain at first as to the topic of his studies, for he was a student of the renowned ecclesiastical historian August Neander, and dallied with Naturphilosophie, geology, and physics, but eventually began to study medicine with such zeal and success as to attract the notice of Johannes Peter Müller (1801–1858), a well-known professor of anatomy and physiology.

Müller's earlier studies had been distinctly physiological, but his preferences caused him later to study comparative anatomy. He had, about the time when the young du Bois-Reymond came to his lectures, published his Elements of Physiology, which contains the following statement:

Though there appears to be something in the phenomena of living beings which cannot be explained by ordinary mechanical, physical or chemical laws, much may be so explained, and we may without fear push these explanations as far as we can, so long as we keep to the solid ground of observation and experiment.

In 1840 Müller made du Bois-Reymond his assistant in physiology, and as the beginning of an inquiry gave him a copy of the essay which the Italian physicist Carlo Matteucci had just published on the electric phenomena of animals. This determined the work of du Bois-Reymond's life. He chose as the subject of his graduation thesis Electric fishes, and so commenced a long series of investigations on bioelectricity. The results of these inquiries were made known partly in papers communicated to scientific journals, but also and chiefly by his work Investigations of Animal Electricity, the first part of which was published in 1848, the last in 1884. In 1892 he was awarded honorary membership of the Manchester Literary and Philosophical Society in recognition of this work.

In 1852 while living alone and unable to get a professorship he traveled to England and met his second cousin Jeannette Claude, whom he courted and married in 1853. The couple had ten children, one of whom died in infancy.

Concerning religious belief, du Bois-Reymond was an atheist.

== Works ==
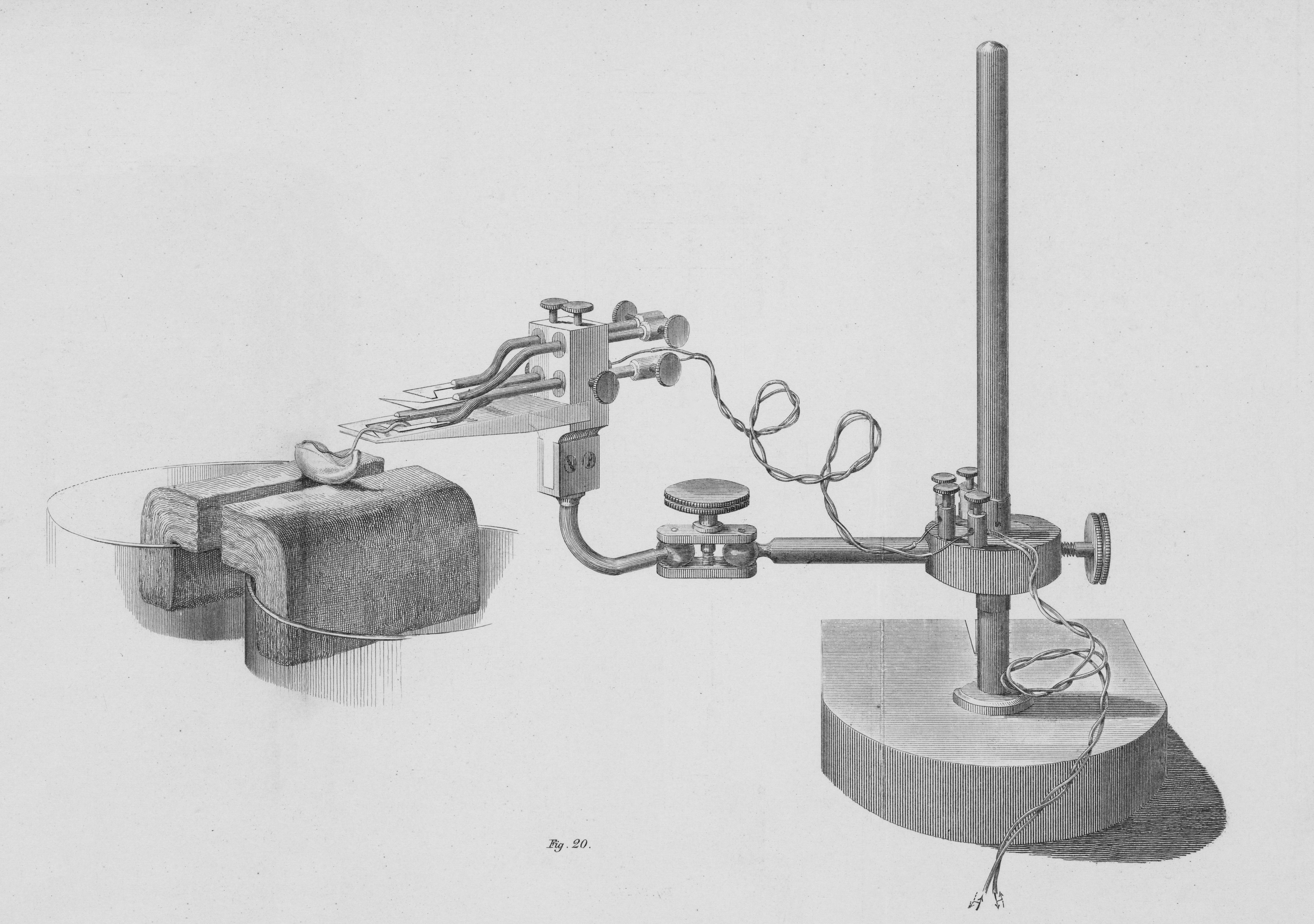
Emil du Bois-Reymond's experimental apparatus, c. 1843

Investigations of Animal Electricity may be seen in two ways. On the one hand, it is a record of the exact determination and approximative analysis of the electric phenomena presented by living beings. Viewed from this standpoint, it represents a significant advance in biological knowledge. Du Bois-Reymond built up this branch of science, by inventing or improving methods, by devising new instruments of observation, or by adapting old ones. On the other hand, the volumes in question contain an exposition of a theory of bioelectricity. In them du Bois-Reymond put forward a general conception that a living tissue, such as muscle, might be regarded as composed of a number of electric molecules, and that the electric behavior of the muscle was the product of these elementary units. We now know that these are sodium, potassium and other ions, the gradients of which are responsible for maintaining membrane potentials in excitable cells.

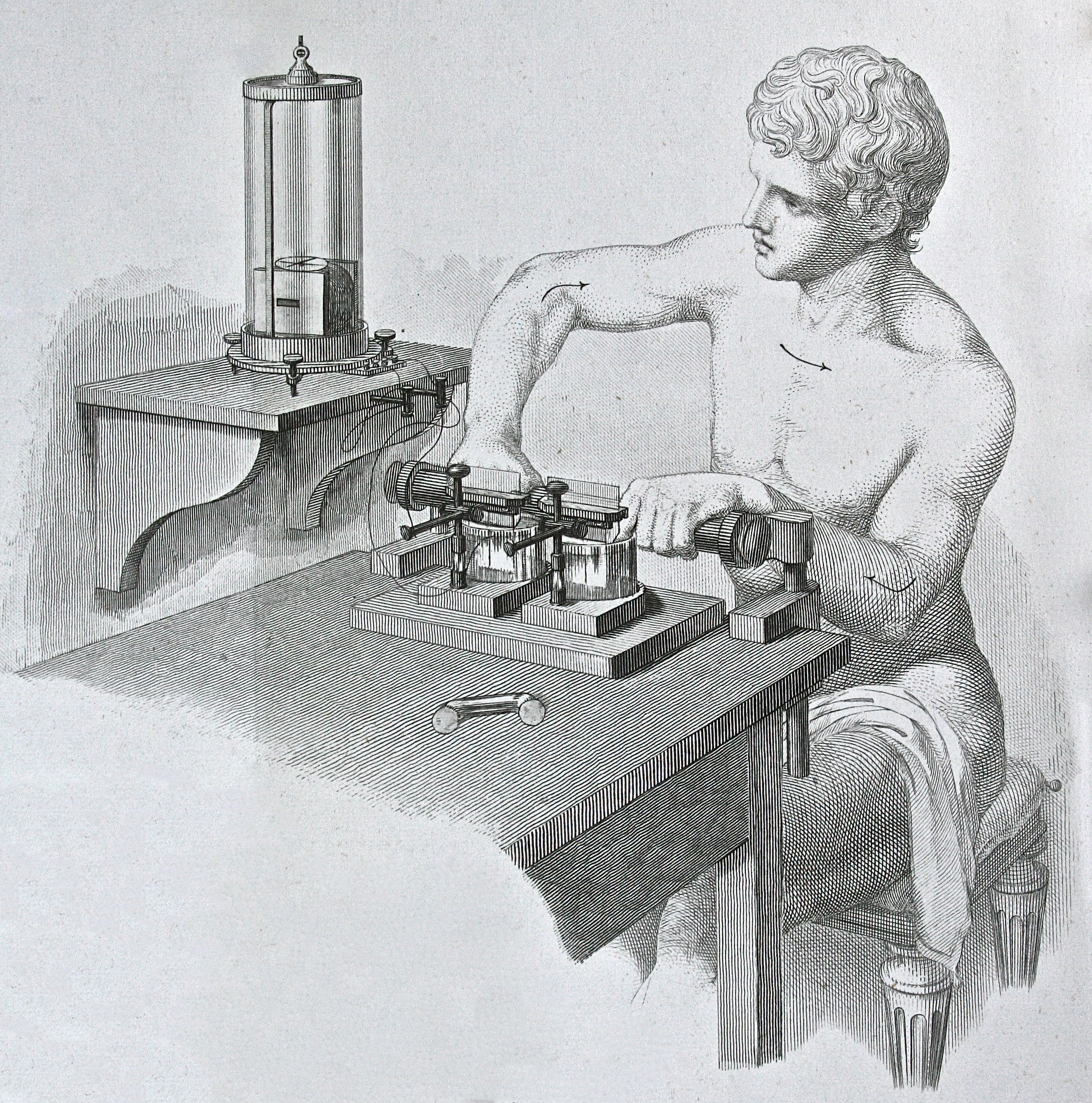
Image of the experiment witnessed by Humboldt

One of the earliest and most significant admirers of du Bois-Reymond's work was Alexander von Humboldt. Du Bois-Reymond demonstrated his experiments for him in Berlin; Humboldt praised Investigations of Animal Electricity and quoted from it in the third edition of Views of Nature in 1849, helping publicize du Bois-Reymond's findings to a broader audience:

In all living organisms, dissimilar parts lie in contact with one another. In all of them are paired the fixed and the fluid. Wherever are found organism and life, electrical tension or the play of voltaic piles appears, as is shown by the experiments of Nobili and Mateucci, and even more by the recent admirable work of Emil Dubois [sic]. This last physical scientist has succeeded in "substantiating the presence of electrical muscle currents in living and completely unharmed bodies of animals." He shows "how the human body, by means of a copper wire, can at will move a magnetic needle back and forth at a distance." I was a witness to these movements brought forth at will, and I see a great, unexpected light cast upon phenomena to which I arduously and hopefully devoted so many youthful hours.

— Alexander von Humboldt, Views of Nature, "Concerning the Steppes and Deserts"

His theory was soon criticized by several contemporary physiologists, such as Ludimar Hermann, who maintained that intact living tissue such as muscle does not generate electric currents unless it has suffered injury. The subsequent controversy was ultimately resolved in 1902 by du Bois-Reymond's student Julius Bernstein, who incorporated parts of both theories into an ionic model of action potential. Thus, du Bois-Reymond's work focused on animal electricity, although he made other physiological inquiries — such as could be studied by physical methods — concerning the phenomena of diffusion, the muscular production of lactic acid, and the development of shocks by electric fishes.

Du Bois-Reymond exerted great influence as a teacher. In 1858, upon the death of Johannes Müller, the professorship of anatomy and physiology at the University of Berlin was divided into a professorship of human and comparative anatomy, which was given to Karl Bogislaus Reichert (1811–1883), and a professorship of physiology, which was given to du Bois-Reymond. This he held until his death, performing research for many years without adequate accommodation. In 1877, the Prussian government granted his wish and provided him with a modern physiological laboratory.

In 1851 du Bois-Reymond was admitted to the Academy of Sciences of Berlin, and in 1876 he became its perpetual secretary. Like his friend Hermann von Helmholtz, who had also studied under Johannes Peter Müller, du Bois-Reymond was known throughout Europe. He used his influence for the advancement of science, introducing the theories of thermodynamics and Darwin to students at the University of Berlin. He owed the largest part of his fame to occasional discourses on literature, history, and philosophy which were reprinted and translated internationally.

== Oratory ==
=== On nationalism ===
Following France's declaration of war on Prussia on 3 August 1870, du Bois-Reymond proclaimed that "the University of Berlin, quartered opposite the King's palace, is, by the deed of its foundation, the intellectual bodyguard (das geistige Leibregiment) of the House of Hohenzollern." But by the time of France's surrender on 26 January 1871 du Bois-Reymond had come to regret his words, lamenting the "national hatred of two embittered peoples." His 1878 lecture "On National Feeling" expanded on this topic, offering one of the earliest analyses of nationalism after those of Lord Acton and Fustel de Coulanges.

=== On history ===
In 1877 du Bois-Reymond presented a view of the past that highlighted science as the sole endeavor that demonstrated any improvement. "Science is the chief instrument of civilization," he wrote, "and the history of science the essential history of humanity.” In 1936 his argument was repeated by George Sarton in a lecture inaugurating a seminary in the history of science at Harvard University:

Definition. Science is systematized positive knowledge, or what has been taken as such at different ages and in different places.

Theorem. The acquisition and systematization of positive knowledge are the only human activities which are truly cumulative and progressive.

Corollary. The history of science is the only history which can illustrate the progress of mankind. In fact, progress has no definite and unquestionable meaning in other fields than the field of science.

One historiographer described du Bois-Reymond's attention to the history of science as "the first and indeed the most decisive attack on established historical scholarship" in the 19th century.

=== On Darwinism ===
Du Bois-Reymond was the first German professor to convert to Darwinism. He expounded the theory in popular classes at the University of Berlin, in itinerant lectures in the Ruhr and the Rhineland, and in formal addresses translated and reprinted across Europe and North America. Unlike his rival Ernst Haeckel, du Bois-Reymond espoused a mechanistic interpretation of natural selection that anticipated modern views. Few in Germany took offense at his teachings until 1883, when his obituary to Darwin outraged conservatives and Catholics.

=== On Goethe ===
In 1882 du Bois-Reymond dismissed Goethe's science as the muddled product of a bygone era. His address met with shock and outrage. Privately, du Bois-Reymond noted, "In Germany there is a widespread community inculcated in the worship of great literary works which takes as blasphemy every expression of approval that is not absolute.... Heaven forfend if someone dares to check to see if their idols have feet of clay."

=== On epistemology ===
In 1880 du Bois-Reymond delivered a speech to the Berlin Academy of Sciences enumerating seven "world riddles" or "shortcomings" of science:

1. the ultimate nature of matter and force;
2. the origin of motion;
3. the origin of life;
4. the "apparently teleological arrangements of nature" (not an "absolutely transcendent riddle");
5. the origin of simple sensations ("a quite transcendent" question);
6. the origin of intelligent thought and language (which might be known if the origin of sensations could be known); and
7. the question of free will.

Concerning numbers 1, 2 and 5 he proclaimed "Ignorabimus" ("we will never know"). Concerning number 7 he proclaimed "Dubitamus" ("we doubt it').

According to his biographer, "du Bois-Reymond was not the first to suggest that we could never fathom the ultimate nature of mind and matter, but his was the clearest voice of caution towards our modern faith in experiment."

== Sources ==
- Gabriel Finkelstein, "The Greatest Unknown Intellectual of the 19th Century", The MIT Press Reader, 7 November 2019.
- This article incorporates text from a publication now in the public domain: Chisholm, Hugh, ed. (1911). "Du Bois-Reymond, Emil". Encyclopædia Britannica. Vol. 8 (11th ed.). Cambridge University Press. pp. 625–626.
- Cranefield, Paul F. (1 October 1957). "The Organic Physics of 1847 and the Biophysics of Today". Journal of the History of Medicine and Allied Sciences. XII (10): 407–423. doi:10.1093/jhmas/XII.10.407. ISSN 0022-5045.
- Lenoir, Timothy (1 January 1986). "Models and Instruments in the Development of Electrophysiology, 1845–1912". Historical Studies in the Physical and Biological Sciences. 17 (1): 1–54. doi:10.2307/27757574. ISSN 0890-9997.
- Naturwissen und Erkenntnis im 19. Jahrhundert : Emil Du Bois-Reymond. Mann, Gunter, ed. Akademie der Wissenschaften und der Literatur. Kommission für Geschichte der Medizin und der Naturwissenschaften. Hildesheim: Gerstenberg, 1981. ISBN 3-8067-0866-5. OCLC 8307620.
- Pearce, J M (November 2001). "Emil Heinrich Du Bois-Reymond (1818–96)". J. Neurol. Neurosurg. Psychiatry. 71 (5): 620. doi:10.1136/jnnp.71.5.620. PMC 1737619. PMID 11606673.
- Dierig, S (April 2000). "Urbanization, place of experiment and how the electric fish was caught by Emil du Bois-Reymond". Journal of the History of the Neurosciences. 9 (1): 5–13. doi:10.1076/0964-704X(200004)9:1;1-2;FT005. PMID 11232350. S2CID 25228035.
- Gradmann, Christoph (2000). "Geschichte als Naturwissenschaft: Ernst Hallier und Emil du Bois-Reymond als Kulturhistoriker" [History as natural science: Ernst Hallier and Emil du Bois-Reymond as cultural historians]. Medizinhistorisches Journal (in German). 35 (1): 31–54. JSTOR 25805251. PMID 10829580.
- Meltzer, S J (February 1897). "Emil du Bois-Reymond". Science. 5 (110): 217–219. Bibcode:1897Sci.....5..217M. doi:10.1126/science.5.110.217. PMID 17829443.
- Loos, H (August 1985). "[The relation between physiology and medicine in Emil du Bois-Reymond]". Zeitschrift für die Gesamte Hygiene und Ihre Grenzgebiete. 31 (8): 484–5. PMID 3904238.
- Geddes, L A (1999). "From muscle twitches to sustained (tetanic) contraction: the discovery of du Bois-Reymond". IEEE Engineering in Medicine and Biology Magazine. 18 (1): 85–6. PMID 9934607.
