= Nictitating membrane =

"Third eyelid" of some animals

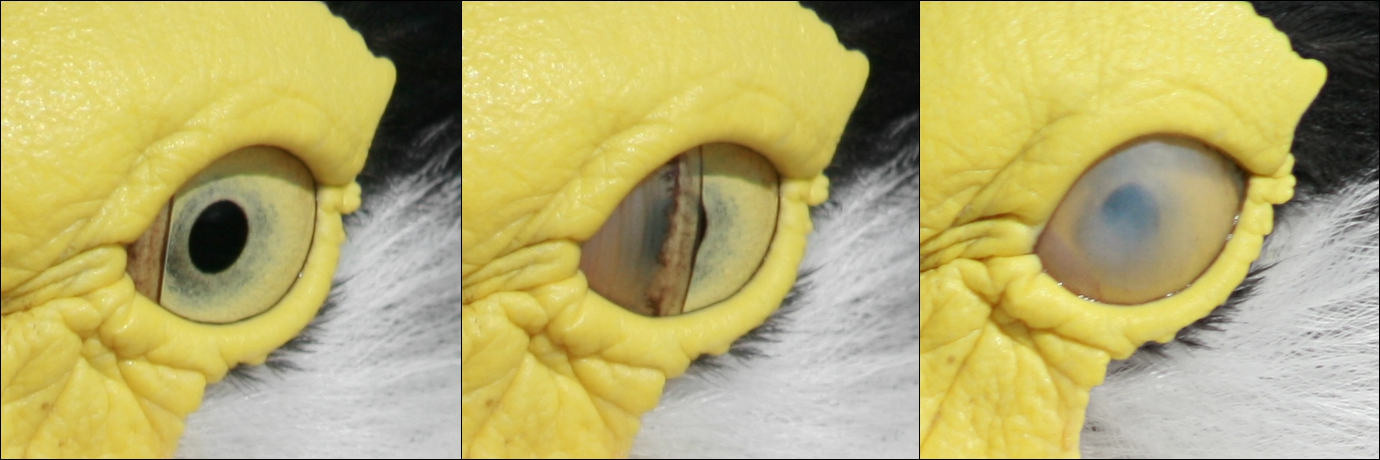
The nictitating membrane of a masked lapwing as it closes over the left eye, originating from the medial canthus

The nictitating membrane (from Latin nictare, to blink) is a transparent or translucent third eyelid present in some animals that can be drawn across the eye from the medial canthus to protect and moisten it while maintaining vision. Most Anura (Note: Except Hymenochirus, Pseudhymenochirus and Pipa species) (tailless amphibians), some reptiles, birds, and sharks, and some mammals (such as cats, beavers, polar bears, seals, sheep, and aardvarks) have full nictitating membranes; in many other mammals, a small, vestigial portion of the nictitating membrane remains in the corner of the eye. It is often informally called a third eyelid or haw; the scientific terms for it are the plica semilunaris, membrana nictitans, or palpebra tertia. Unlike the upper and lower eyelids, the nictitating membrane moves horizontally across the eyeball.

In many species, any stimulus to the eyeball (such as a puff of air) will result in reflex nictitating membrane response. This reflex is widely used as the basis for experiments on classical conditioning in rabbits.

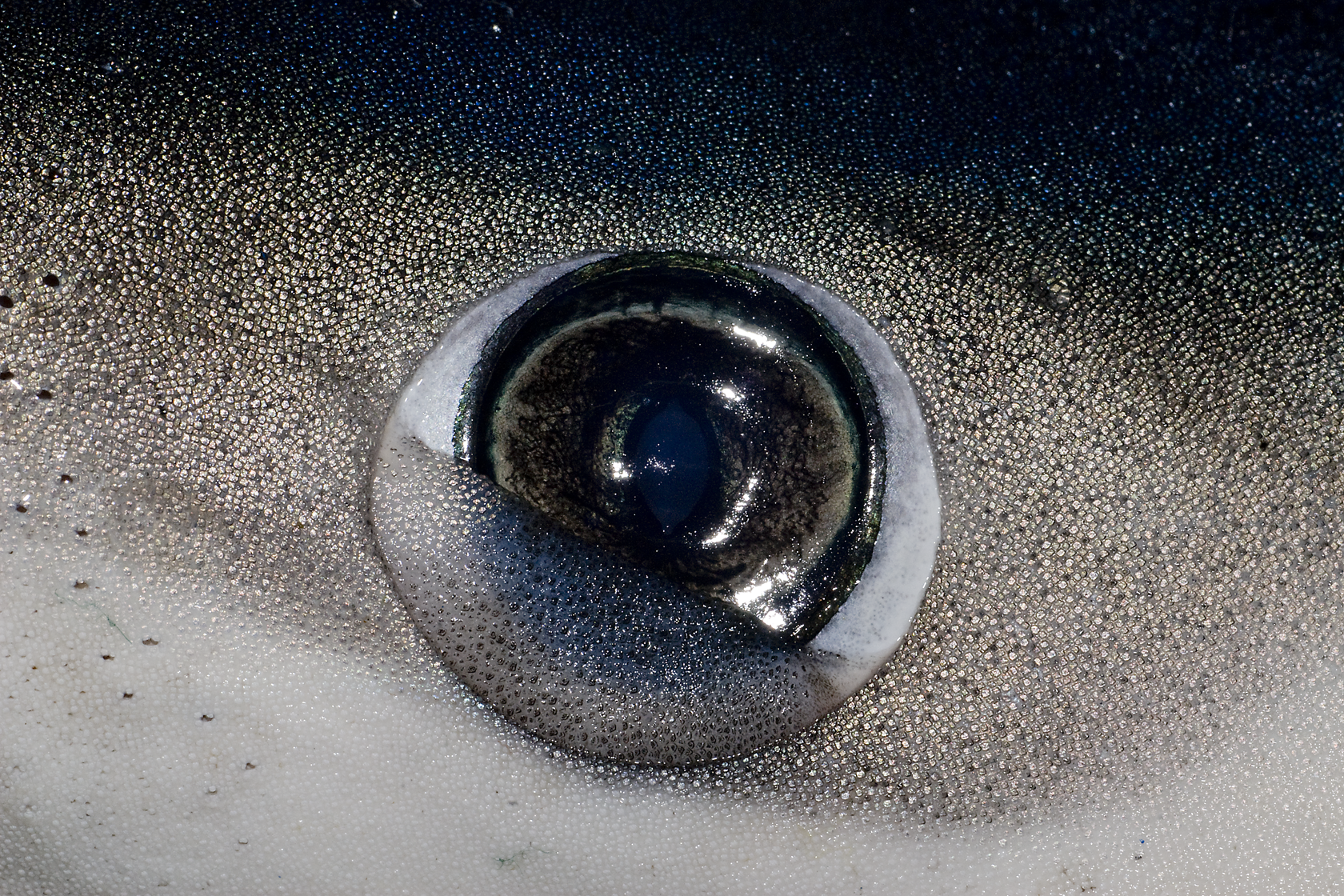
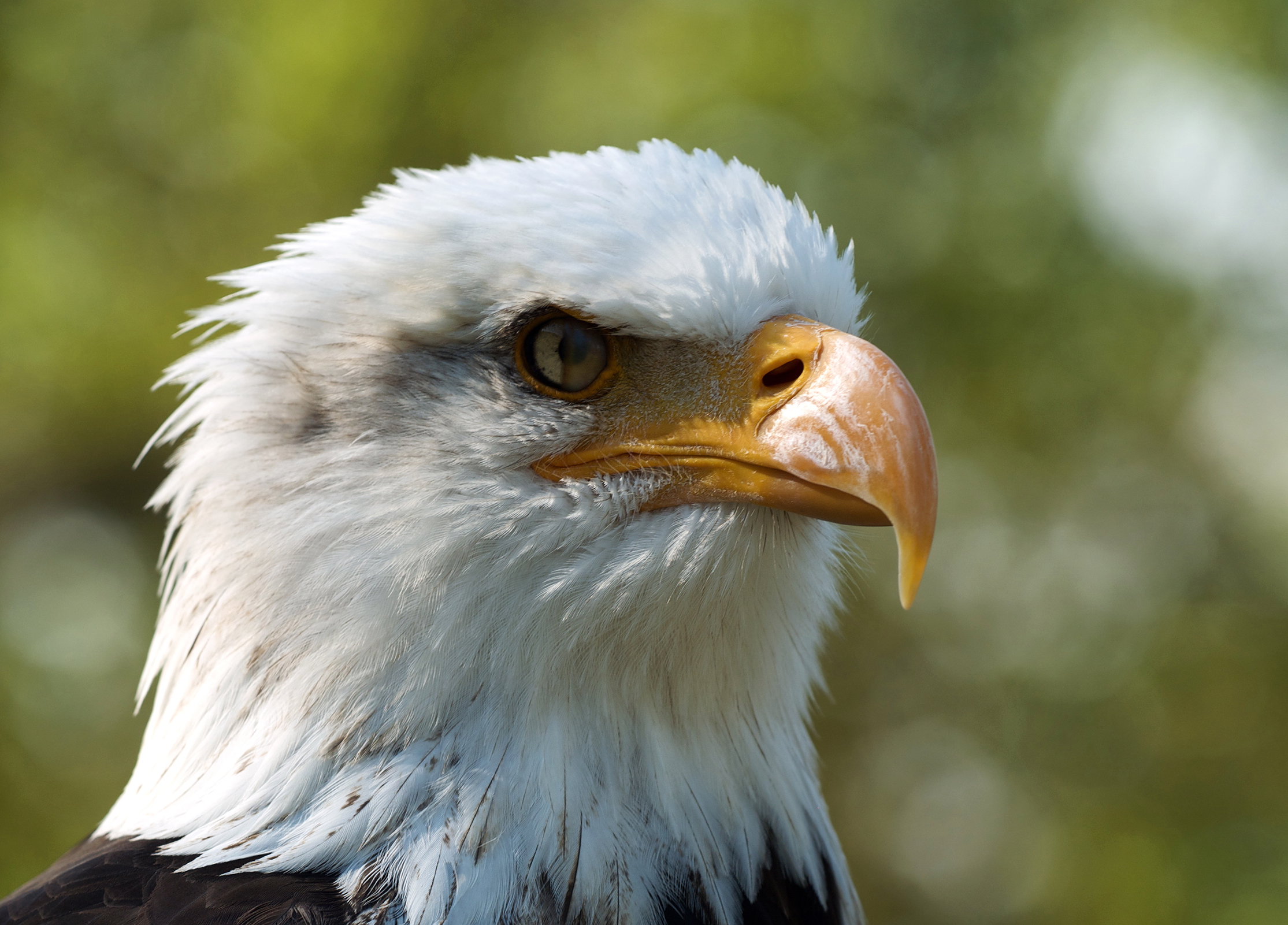
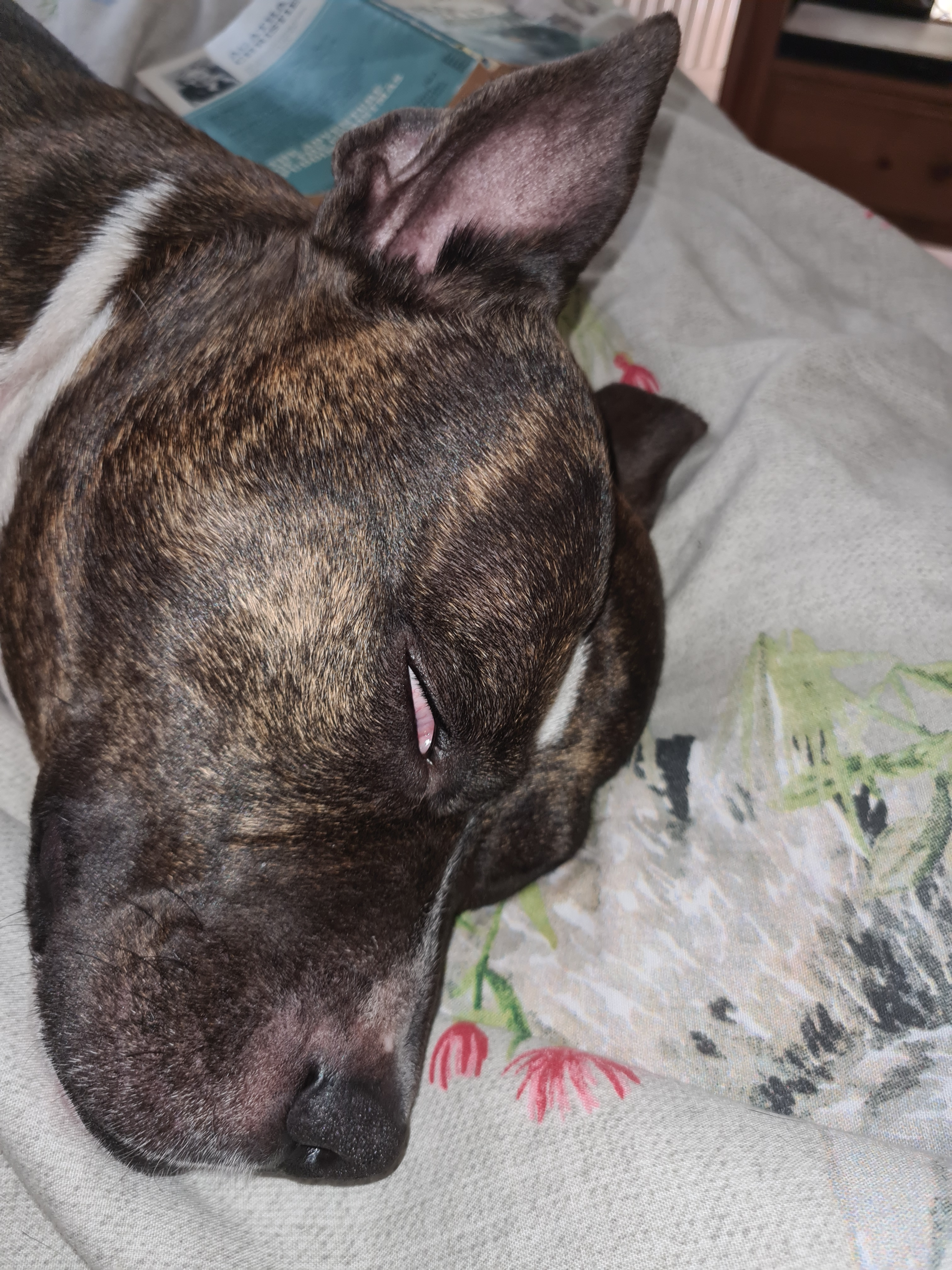
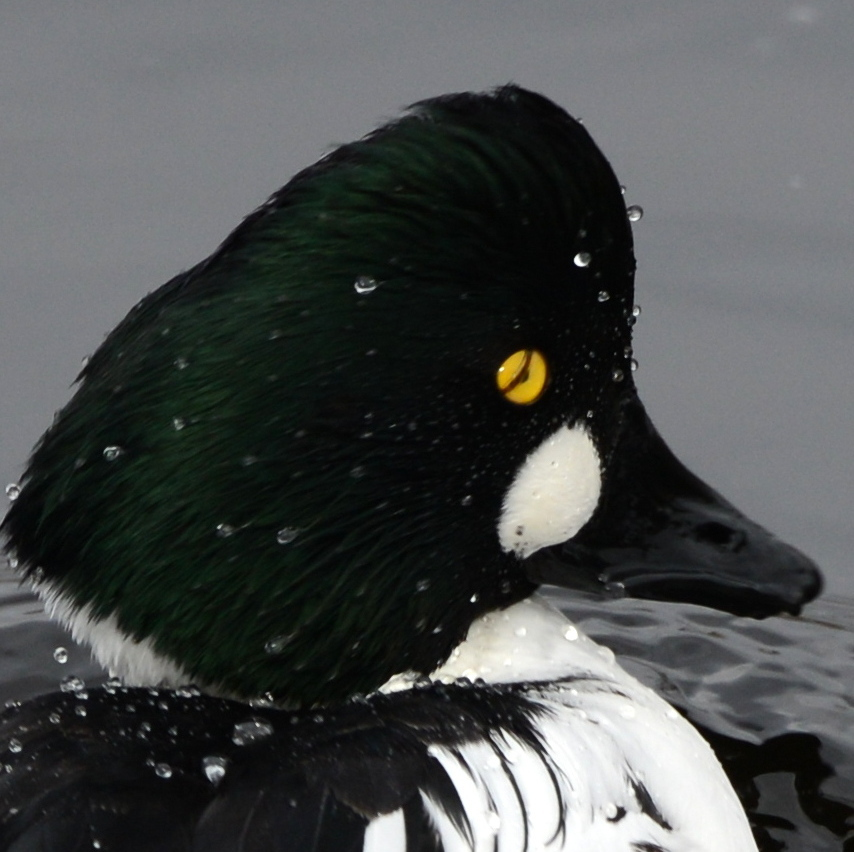
Nictitating membranes of, top to bottom and left to right, a blue shark, a bald eagle (mid-blink), a domestic dog, a common goldeneye, a cat, and a common buzzard (deployed asynchronously on left and right eye)

== Distribution ==
Fully developed nictitating membranes are found in fish, amphibians, reptiles, birds and mammals, but are rare in primates. In humans, the plica semilunaris (also known as the semilunar fold) and its associated muscles are homologous to the nictitating membranes seen in some other mammals and other vertebrates. In most primate species, a plica semilunaris is generally not present, although fully developed nictitating membranes can be found in lemurs and lorisoid primates. Some mammals, such as camels, polar bears, seals and aardvarks, have full nictitating membranes, and many mammals retain a small, vestigial portion of the membrane in the corner of the eye. A gland of the third eyelid (nictitans gland) or Harder's gland is attached to the nictating membranes of some animals and may produce up to 50% of the tear film.

== Functions ==
The nictitating membrane is normally translucent. In some diving animals, including sea lions, it is activated on land, to remove sand and other debris—its function in most animals. In crocodiles, it protects their eyes from water but also hinders their focus under water. In some diving animals, for example beavers and manatees, it is transparent and moves across the eye to protect it while under water.

Birds can actively control their nictitating membrane. In birds of prey, the membrane also serves to protect the parents' eyes from their chicks while they are feeding them, and when peregrine falcons go into their 200-mile-per-hour (320 km/h) dives, they will blink repeatedly with their nictitating membranes to clear debris and spread moisture across the eyes. Woodpeckers tighten their nictitating membrane a millisecond prior to their beak impacting the trunk of a tree to prevent shaking-induced retinal injury.

The nictitating membrane can be used to protect the eye while attacking prey, as in sharks.

It can also protect the eye from ultraviolet radiation, similar to its role in polar bears to prevent snow blindness.

== Vestigiality ==
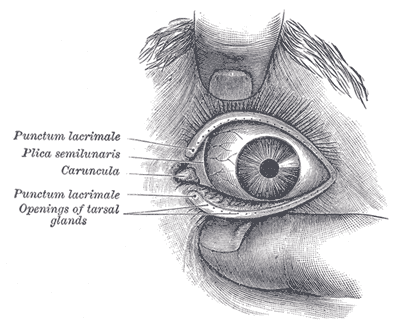
The plica semilunaris of conjunctiva is a vestigial remnant of a nictitating membrane in humans.

Nictitating membranes in cats and dogs do not have many muscle fibers, so they are not usually visible; chronic visibility should be taken as a sign of poor condition or ill health. The membrane can, however, be seen clearly by gently opening the eye of the healthy animal when it is asleep, or by pushing down/applying pressure on the eyeball, which will cause it to appear. In some breeds of dogs, the nictitating membrane can be prone to prolapse of the gland of the third eyelid, resulting in a condition called cherry eye.

== See also ==
- Accessory abducens nucleus
- Human vestigiality
