= Accessory facial motor nucleus =

Neuron cluster of the pons

The accessory facial motor nucleus is a small cluster of neurons dorsal to the facial motor nucleus in the pontine tegmentum. It has been reported for the human, rat, and mouse.

== See also ==
- Accessory abducens nucleus
