= Levator claviculae muscle =

Vestigial skeletal neck muscle

Details
- Origin: Anterior portion of transverse processes of C1 – C4 vertebrae
- Insertion: Lateral half of the clavicle
- Artery: Ascending cervical artery
- Nerve: C2-C5
- Actions: Lifts clavicle

Identifiers
- Latin: Musculus levator claviculae or musculus omocervicalis

In human anatomy, the levator claviculae is a very rare accessory and vestigial skeletal muscle in the posterior triangle of the neck. It originates on the transverse processes of the upper cervical vertebrae and is inserted in the lateral half of the clavicle. Though a supernumerary muscle present in only 2–3% of all people, it is not an abnormality but a variant of normal human anatomy with an atavistic character.

It has also been referred to as the omocervicalis, cleidocervicalis, and tracheloacromial muscle, with the variation in names indicating different sites of origin and insertion.

== Structure ==
Its origin is on at least the third uppermost vertebrae, from where it courses inferiorly and laterally, lateral to the scalene and levator scapulae muscles but medial to the sternocleidomastoid muscle. Passing posteriorly to the latter muscle, it is inserted either to the middle of the clavicle or, more frequently, to the lateral third of the clavicle. It might also blend with the trapezius before its insertion.

It has been reported to originate on the sixth cervical vertebra.

=== Variation ===
The levator claviculae is an infrequently recognized anatomical variant in humans, distinguished from, for example, cervical adenopathy or a thrombosed vein, but a normal muscle in lower mammals and anthropoids. In humans, when present, it often appears unilaterally, most commonly on the left side, or bilaterally.

The embryologic origin of the muscle is controversial and subject to numerous hypotheses. It has been proposed to originate from several neighbouring muscles, including the sternocleidomastoid, the trapezius, the scalenus anterior, and the longus colli, but is possibly derived from an additional segmentation of the ventrolateral muscle primordia of the neck.

Uncommon in human anatomy, the levator claviculae is nearly always present in most other mammals — including gibbons, orangutans, and chimpanzees. There are yet no phylogenetic explanations for its absence in humans.

== History ==
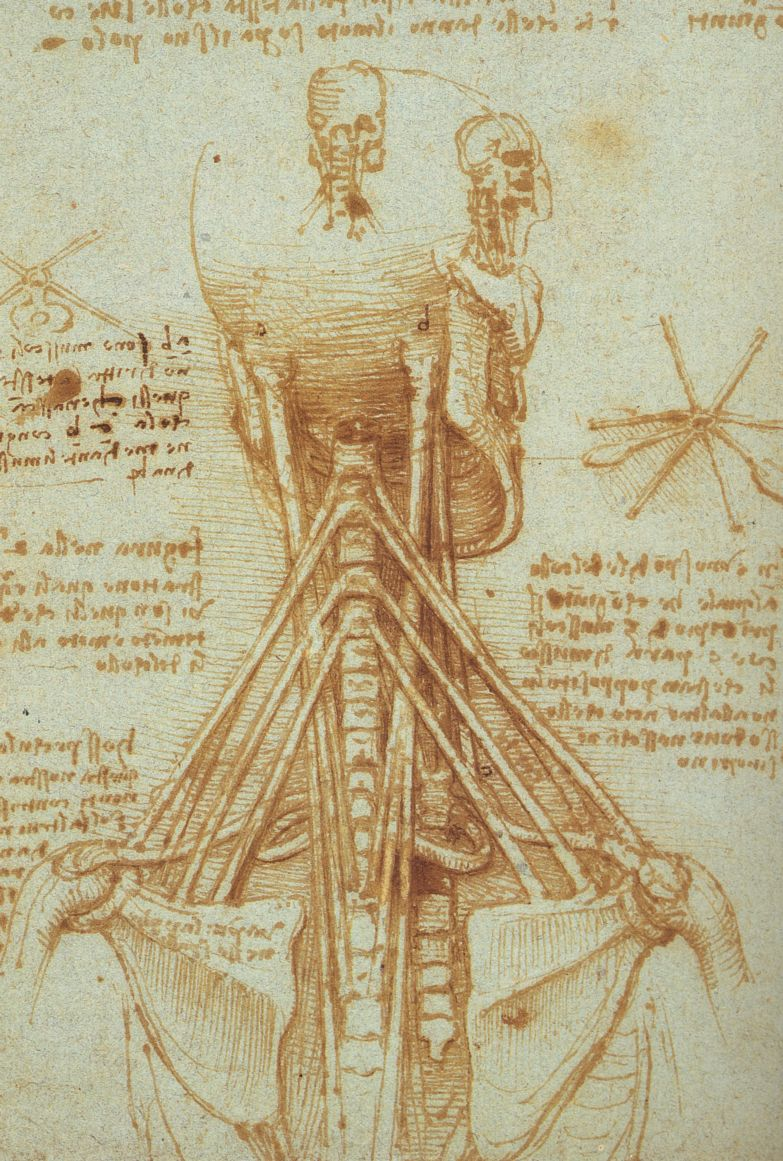
Leonardo, Anatomy of the Neck, c. 1515

The first documented observation of the levator claviculae occurs in an anatomical drawing by Leonardo da Vinci, but the first documented case was not reported until 1813. Darwin briefly described the muscle as an example of many muscles "found in all kinds of apes" but rare in humans. About the same time, Huxley and Wood reported the muscle has a predominantly unilateral occurrence. Since then only a dozen cases have been reported and the traditional 2–3% ratio, attributed to Wood, is possibly an overestimation not clearly corroborated by recent research.

German anatomist Robert Wiedersheim included it in his list of 86 vestigial organs.
