= Goose bumps =

Physiological response to stimuli

Goosebumps / Goose pimples
- Other names: Goose-pimples (in British English), goose-skin, goose-flesh, cutis anserina, horripilation, horripilatio
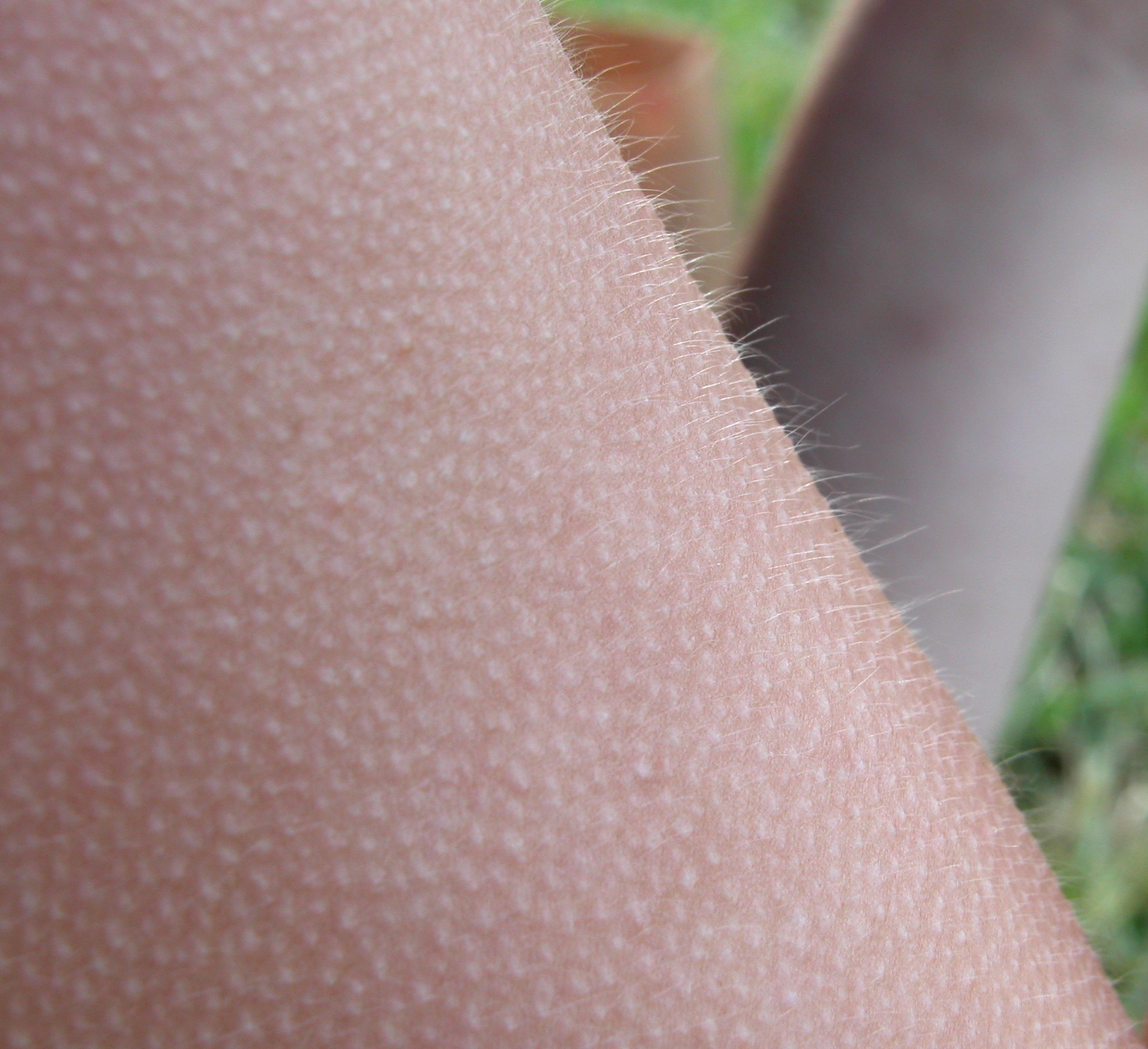
- Goose-bumps on a human arm
- Specialty: Dermatology

Goose bumps (in American English), goose pimples (in British English), goosebumps, or gooseflesh are the bumps on a person's skin at the base of body hairs which may involuntarily develop when a person is tickled, cold or experiencing strong emotions such as fear, euphoria or sexual arousal.

The formation of goose bumps in humans under stress is considered by some to be a vestigial reflex, though visible piloerection is associated with changes in skin temperature in humans. The reflex of producing goose bumps is known as piloerection or the pilomotor reflex, or, more traditionally, horripilation. It occurs in many mammals; a prominent example is porcupines, which raise their quills when threatened, or sea otters when they encounter sharks or other predators.

== Anatomy and biology ==
Goose bumps are created when tiny muscles at the base of each hair, known as arrector pili muscles, contract and pull the hair straight up. The reflex is started by the sympathetic nervous system, which is responsible for many fight-or-flight responses. The muscle cells connected to the hair follicle have been visualized by actin immunofluorescence.

=== Arrector pili muscle ===
Arrector pili muscles (APM) are smooth muscles which connect the basement membrane to the hair follicle. When these muscles contract, they increase the trapping of air on the surface of the skin and in turn, causes thermoregulation to the body. It used to be believed that each APM was connected to an individual hair follicle. More recent studies have disproved this and now explain that there can be multiple hair follicles connected to a single APM. In between the hair follicle and the APM there are lobules which form an angular shape. These lobules are sebaceous gland lobules which are supported by the APM.

1) Epidermis 2) Arrector pili muscle 3) Hair follicle 4) Dermis The diagram shows that the arrector pili muscle is connected to the hair follicle and the epidermis resulting in the erection of the hair during muscle contraction causing goose bumps.

=== Hair follicle ===
Hair follicles have four parts. There is the bulb, supra bulbar area, isthmus and infundibulum. The bulb is to be known as the part that is responsible for the growth of the rest of the hair follicle.

=== As a response to cold ===
In animals covered with fur or hair, the erect hairs trap air to create a layer of insulation. Goose bumps can also be a response to anger or fear: the erect hairs make the animal appear larger, in order to intimidate enemies. This can be observed in the intimidation displays of chimpanzees, some New World monkeys like the cotton-top tamarin, in stressed mice and rats, and in frightened cats.

=== In humans ===
In humans, goose bumps can even extend to piloerection as a reaction to hearing nails scratch on a chalkboard, or feeling or remembering strong and positive emotions (e.g., after winning a sports event), or while watching a horror film.

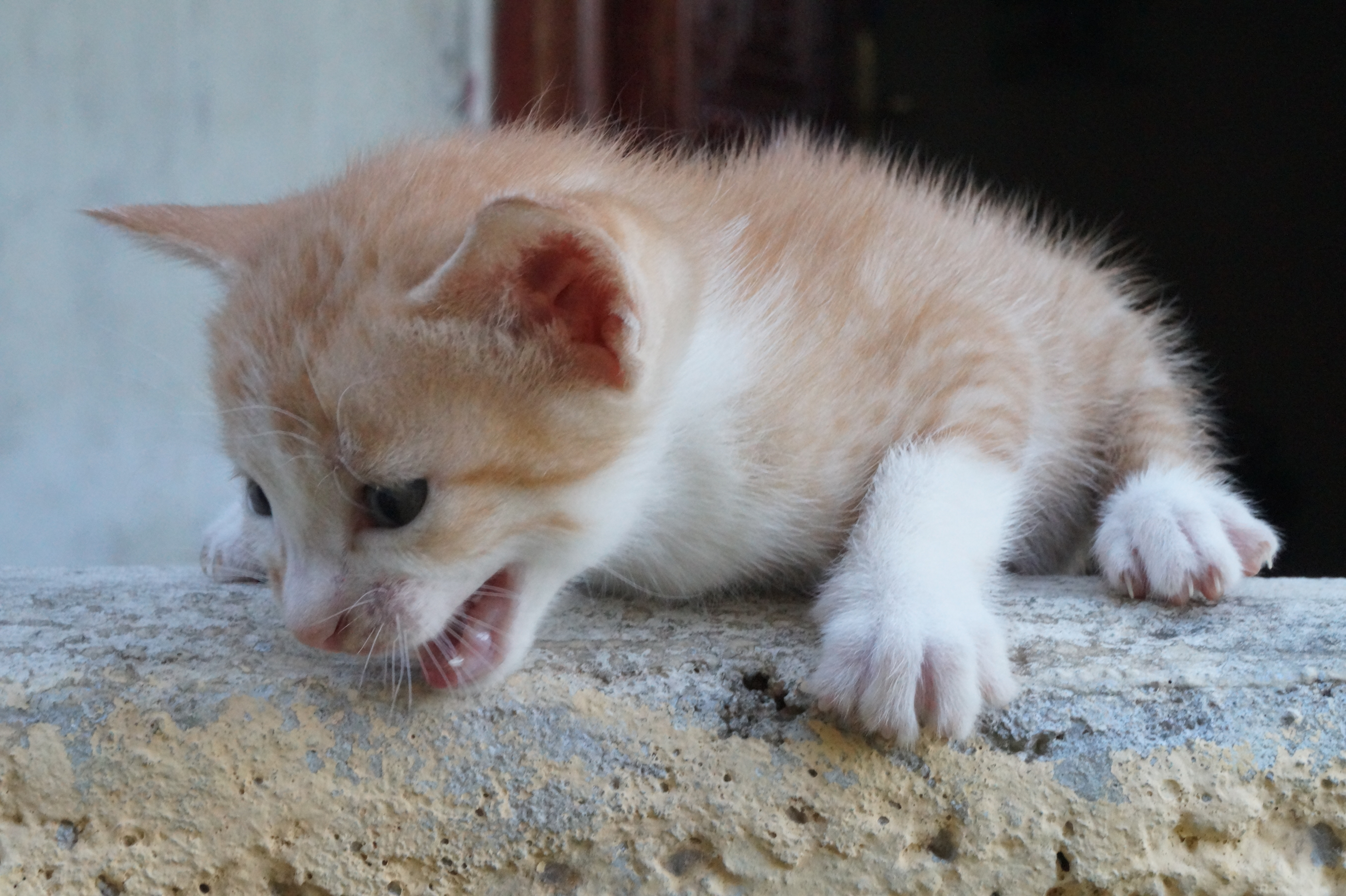
Goose bumps in a kitten, due to the fear of falling

Some people can deliberately evoke goose bumps in themselves without any external trigger. This is called "voluntarily generated piloerection." Further research is needed to discover more on such people.

Goose bumps are accompanied by a specific physiological response pattern that is thought to indicate the emotional state of being moved.

In humans, goose bumps occur everywhere on the body, including the legs, neck, and other areas of the skin that have hair. In some people, they even occur in the face or on the head. In humans, goose bumps tends to occur across the whole body, especially when elicited by thermal or emotional stimuli, and only locally when elicited via tactile stimuli.

Piloerection is also a classic symptom of some diseases, such as temporal lobe epilepsy, some brain tumors, and autonomic hyperreflexia. Goose bumps can also be caused by withdrawal from opiates such as heroin. A skin condition that mimics goose bumps in appearance is keratosis pilaris.

== Causes ==
=== Extreme temperatures ===
Goose bumps can be experienced in the presence of flash-cold temperatures, for example being in a cold environment, and the skin being able to re-balance its surface temperature quickly. The stimulus of cold surroundings causes the tiny muscles (arrector pili muscle) attached to each hair follicle to contract. This contraction causes the hair strands to stand straight.

=== Intense emotion ===
The emotional correlates of piloerection in humans are not well understood. People often say they feel their "hair standing on end" when they are frightened or in awe. Research has shown that the self-reported feeling of goosebumps does not always correlate with a physiological piloerection.

=== Music ===
Music can also be a cause of piloerection. Most research using musical stimuli has focused on self-reported "chills" which is a subjective experience, unlike piloerection which is an objectively quantifiable physiological reaction. However, research has shown that self-reported piloerection does not correspond to observed piloerection. Thus, research on self-reported chills should not be considered to extend to the physiological phenomena of piloerection.

=== Ingestion ===
Medications and herbal supplements that affect body temperature and blood flow may cause piloerection. For example, one of the common reported side effects of the intake of yohimbine is piloerection.

=== Opiate withdrawal ===
Piloerection is one of the signs of opioid withdrawal. The term "cold turkey" meaning abrupt withdrawal from a drug, may derive from the goose bumps that occur during abrupt withdrawal from opioids; this resembles the skin of a refrigerated plucked turkey.

=== Voluntary control ===
An unknown proportion of people may consciously initiate the sensation and physiological signs of piloerection. The phenomenon is discovered spontaneously, appearing to be innate, and is not known to be possible to learn or acquire. Those with the ability frequently are unaware that it is not possible for everyone. The ability appears to correlate with personality traits associated with openness to experience.

== Etymology ==
The term "goose bumps" derives from the phenomenon's association with goose skin. Goose feathers grow from pores in the epidermis that resemble human hair follicles. When a goose's feathers are plucked, its skin has protrusions where the feathers were, and these bumps are what the human phenomenon resembles.

It is not clear why the particular fowl, goose, was chosen in English (and German, Greek, Icelandic, Italian, Swedish, Danish, Norwegian, Polish and Czech) as most other birds exhibit this anatomical feature. Other languages may use a different species. For example, the hen or chicken is used in Vietnamese, Korean, Japanese, Persian, Cantonese, Finnish, Dutch, Luxembourgish, French, Spanish, Portuguese, Romanian, and Galician; Irish uses both; Hebrew, the duck; the ants (referred to as "murashki", alluding to the feeling of ants crawling on one's skin) in Ukrainian and Russian; and a variety of synonyms in Mandarin.

Some authors have applied "goose bumps" to the symptoms of sexually transmitted diseases. "Bitten by a Winchester goose" was a common euphemism for having contracted syphilis in the 16th century. "Winchester geese" was the nickname for the prostitutes of Southern London, licensed by the Bishop of Winchester in the area around his London palace.

== See also ==
- Autonomous sensory meridian response
- Cold chill
- Frisson
