= Human vestigiality =

Human traits which lost their original function through evolution

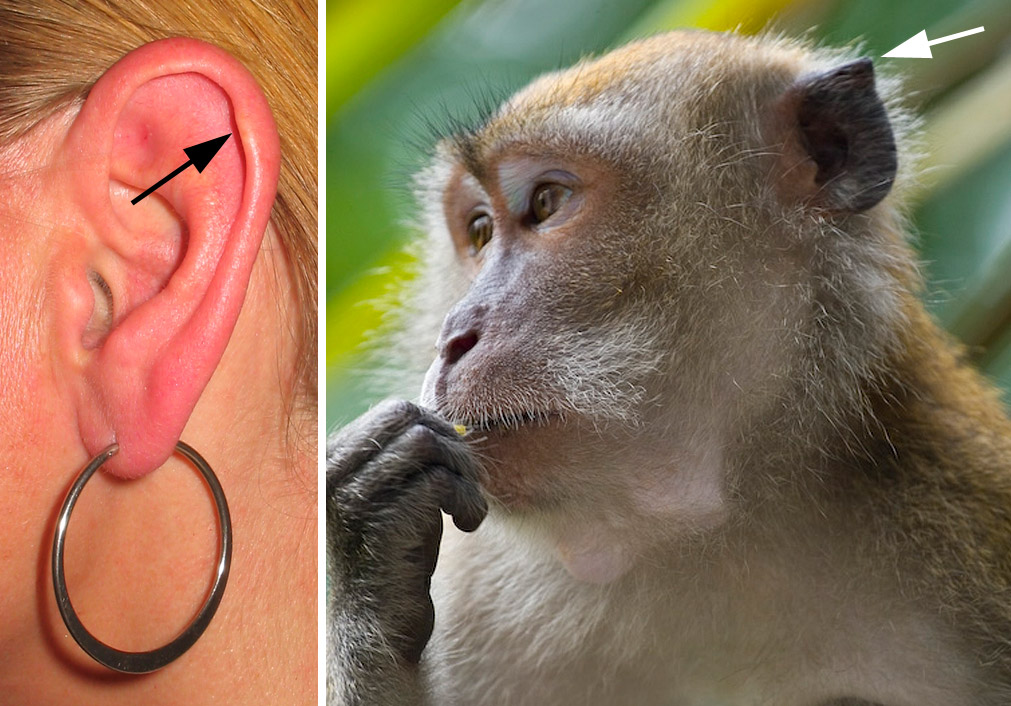
The muscles connected to the ears of a human do not develop enough to have the same mobility allowed to monkeys. Arrows show the vestigial structure called Darwin's tubercle.

In the context of human evolution, vestigiality involves those traits occurring in humans that have lost all or most of their original function through evolution. Although structures called vestigial often appear functionless, they may retain lesser functions or develop minor new ones. In some cases, structures once identified as vestigial simply had an unrecognized function. Vestigial organs are sometimes called rudimentary organs. Many human characteristics are also vestigial in other primates and related animals.

== History ==
Charles Darwin listed a number of putative human vestigial features, which he termed rudimentary, in The Descent of Man (1871). These included the muscles of the ear; wisdom teeth; the appendix; the tail bone; body hair; and the semilunar fold in the corner of the eye. Darwin also commented on the sporadic nature of many vestigial features, particularly musculature. Making reference to the work of the anatomist William Turner, Darwin highlighted a number of sporadic muscles that he identified as vestigial remnants of the panniculus carnosus, particularly the sternalis muscle.

In 1893, Robert Wiedersheim published The Structure of Man, a book on human anatomy and its relevance to evolutionary history. This book contains a list of 86 human organs he considered vestigial, which he called "wholly or in part functionless, some appearing in the Embryo alone, others present during Life constantly or inconstantly. For the greater part Organs which may be rightly termed Vestigial." His list of supposedly vestigial organs included many of the examples on this page as well as others then mistakenly believed to be purely vestigial, such as the pineal gland, the thymus gland, and the pituitary gland. Some of these organs that had lost their obvious, original functions later turned out to have retained functions that had gone unrecognized before the discovery of hormones or many of the functions and tissues of the immune system. Examples included:

- the role of the pineal in the regulation of the circadian rhythm (neither the function nor even the existence of melatonin was yet known);
- discovery of the role of the thymus in the immune system lay many decades in the future; it remained a mystery until the mid-20th century;
- the pituitary and hypothalamus, with their many and varied hormones, were far from understood, let alone the complexity of their interrelationships.

Historically, there was a trend not only to dismiss the appendix as being uselessly vestigial, but an anatomical hazard liable to dangerous inflammation. As late as the mid-20th century, many reputable authorities conceded it no beneficial function. This was a view supported, or perhaps inspired, by Darwin himself in the 1874 edition of his book The Descent of Man, and Selection in Relation to Sex. The organ's patent liability to appendicitis and poorly understood role left it open to blame for a number of possibly unrelated conditions. For example, in 1916, a surgeon claimed that removal of the appendix had cured several cases of trifacial neuralgia and other nerve pain about the head and face, even though he said the evidence for appendicitis in those patients was inconclusive. The discovery of hormones and hormonal principles, notably by Bayliss and Starling, argued against these views, but in the early 20th century, a great deal of fundamental research remained to be done on the functions of large parts of the digestive tract. In 1916, an author found it necessary to argue against the idea that the colon had no important function and that "the ultimate disappearance of the appendix is a coordinate action and not necessarily associated with such frequent inflammations as we are witnessing in the human".

There had been a long history of doubt about such dismissive views. Around 1920, the surgeon Kenelm Hutchinson Digby documented previous observations, going back more than 30 years, that suggested lymphatic tissues, such as the tonsils and appendix, might have substantial immunological functions.

== Anatomical ==
=== Appendix ===
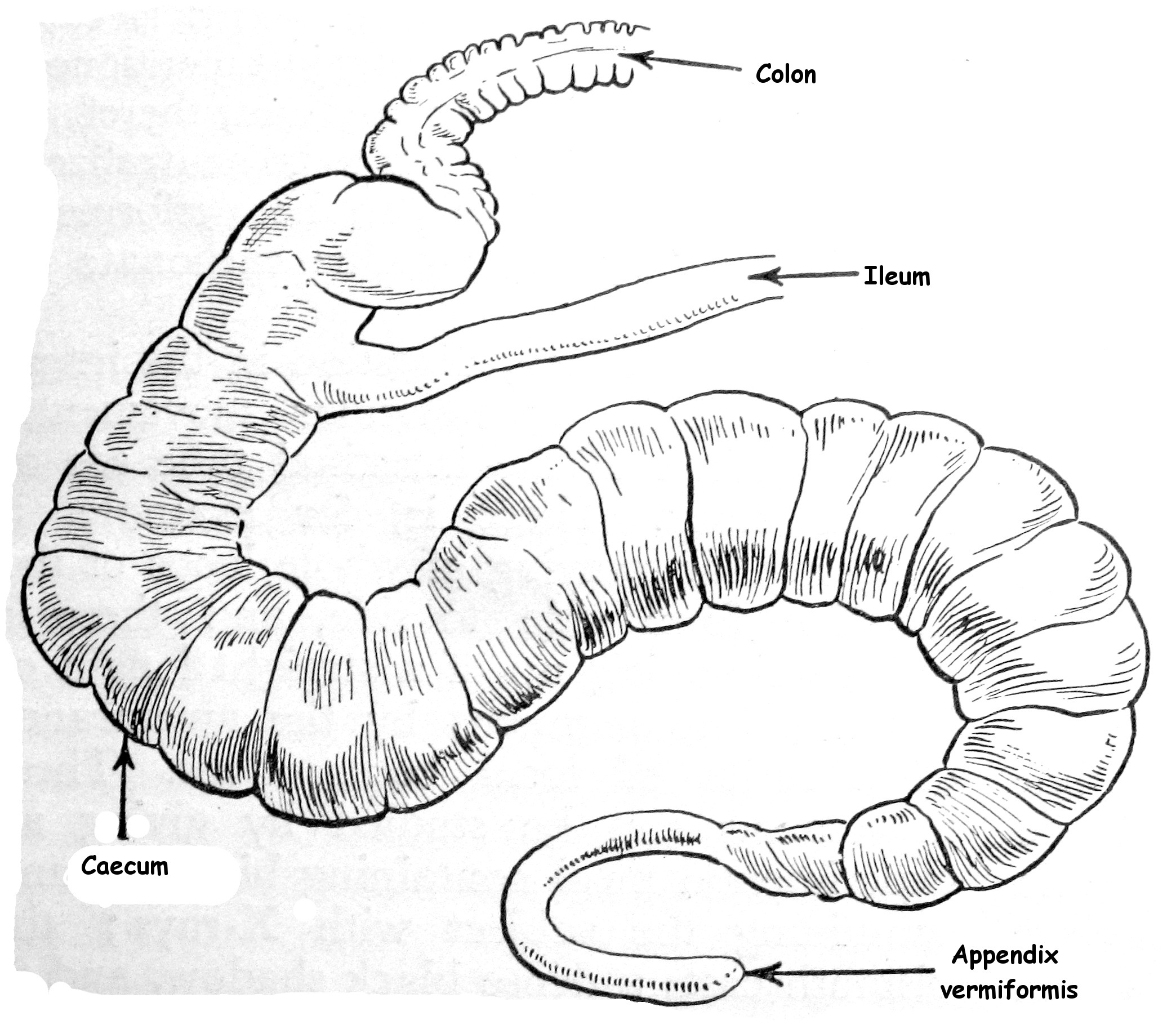
Ileum, caecum and colon of rabbit, showing Appendix vermiformis on fully functional caecum

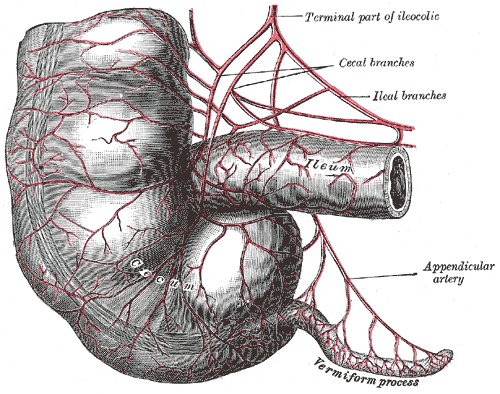
The human vermiform appendix on the vestigial caecum

The appendix was once believed to be a vestige of a redundant organ that in ancestral species had digestive functions, much as it still does in extant species in which intestinal flora hydrolyze cellulose and similar indigestible plant materials. This view has changed in recent decades, with research suggesting that the appendix may serve an important purpose. In particular, it may serve as a reservoir for beneficial gut bacteria, possibly to allow the bacteria to reestablish in the colon during recovery from diarrhea or other illnesses.

Some herbivorous animals, such as rabbits, have a terminal vermiform appendix and cecum that apparently bear patches of tissue with immune functions and that may also be important in maintaining the composition of intestinal flora. It does not seem to have much digestive function, if any, and is not present in all herbivores, even those with large caeca. As shown in the accompanying pictures, the human appendix typically is about comparable to that of the rabbit's in size, though the caecum is reduced to a single bulge where the ileum empties into the colon. Some carnivorous animals have appendices too, but few have more than vestigial caeca. In line with the possibility that vestigial organs develop new functions, some research suggests that the appendix may guard against the loss of symbiotic bacteria that aid in digestion, though that is unlikely to be a novel function, given the presence of vermiform appendices in many herbivores. Intestinal bacterial populations entrenched in the appendix may support quick reestablishment of the flora of the large intestine after an illness, poisoning, or after an antibiotic treatment depletes or otherwise causes harmful changes to the bacterial population of the colon.

A 2013 study refutes the idea of an inverse relationship between cecum size and appendix size and presence. It is widely present in Euarchontoglires (a superorder of mammals that includes rodents, lagomorphs and primates) and has also evolved independently in the diprotodont marsupials and monotremes, and is highly diverse in size and shape, which could suggest it is not vestigial. Researchers deduce that the appendix has the ability to protect good bacteria in the gut: when the gut is affected by diarrhea or another illness that cleans out the intestines, the good bacteria in the appendix can repopulate the digestive system and keep the person healthy.

=== Coccyx ===
The coccyx, or tailbone, is the remnant of a lost tail. All mammals have a tail at some point in their development; in humans, it is present for a period of 4 weeks, during stages 14 to 22 of human embryogenesis. This tail is most prominent in human embryos 31–35 days old. The tailbone, at the end of the spine, has lost its original function in assisting balance and mobility, though it still serves some secondary functions, such as being an attachment point for muscles, which explains why it has not degraded further.

In rare cases, congenital defect results in a short tail-like structure being present at birth. Twenty-three cases of human babies born with such a structure have been reported in the medical literature since 1884. In these cases, the spine and skull were determined to be entirely normal. The only abnormality was that of a tail approximately 12 centimeters long. These tails, though of no deleterious effect, were almost always surgically removed.

=== Wisdom teeth ===
Wisdom teeth are vestigial third molars that human ancestors used to help in grinding down plant tissue. The common postulation is that their skulls had larger jaws with more teeth, which were possibly used to help chew down foliage to compensate for a lack of ability to efficiently digest the cellulose that makes up a plant cell wall. As human diets changed, smaller jaws were naturally selected, but the third molars, or "wisdom teeth", still commonly develop in human mouths.

Agenesis (failure to develop) of wisdom teeth in human populations ranges from zero in Tasmanian Aboriginals to nearly 100% in indigenous Mexicans. The difference is related to the PAX9 gene (and perhaps other genes).

=== Vomeronasal organ ===
In some animals, the vomeronasal organ (VNO) is part of a second, completely separate sense of smell, known as the accessory olfactory system. Many studies have been performed to find if there is an actual presence of a VNO in adult human beings. Trotier et al. estimate that around 92% of their subjects who had not had septal surgery had at least one intact VNO. Kjaer and Fisher Hansen, on the other hand, found that the VNO structure disappeared during fetal development as it does for some primates. Smith and Bhatnagar (2000) asserted that Kjaer and Fisher Hansen simply missed the structure in older fetuses. Won (2000) found evidence of a VNO in 13 of his 22 cadavers (59.1%) and in 22 of his 78 living patients (28.2%). Given these findings, some scientists have argued that there is a VNO in adult human beings. Most have sought to identify the opening of the vomeronasal organ in humans, rather than identify the tubular epithelial structure itself. Thus it has been argued that such studies, employing macroscopic observational methods, have sometimes missed or even misidentified the vomeronasal organ.

Among studies that use microanatomical methods, there is no reported evidence that human beings have active sensory neurons like those in other animals' working vomeronasal systems. Furthermore, no evidence suggests there are nerve and axon connections between any existing sensory receptor cells in the adult human VNO and the brain. Likewise, there is no evidence of any accessory olfactory bulb in adult human beings, and the key genes involved in other mammals' VNO function have become pseudogenes in human beings. Therefore, while the presence of a structure in adult human beings is debated, a review of the scientific literature by Tristram Wyatt concluded, "most in the field ... are sceptical about the likelihood of a functional VNO in adult human beings on current evidence."

=== Ear ===
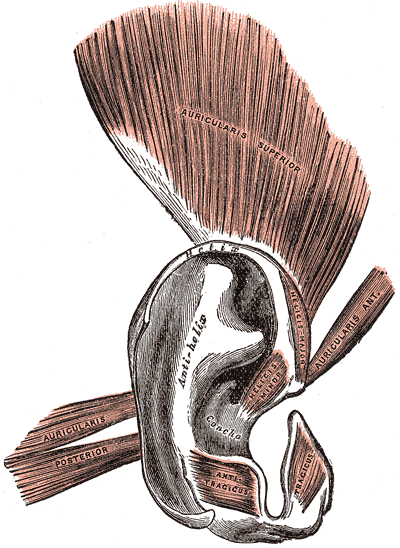
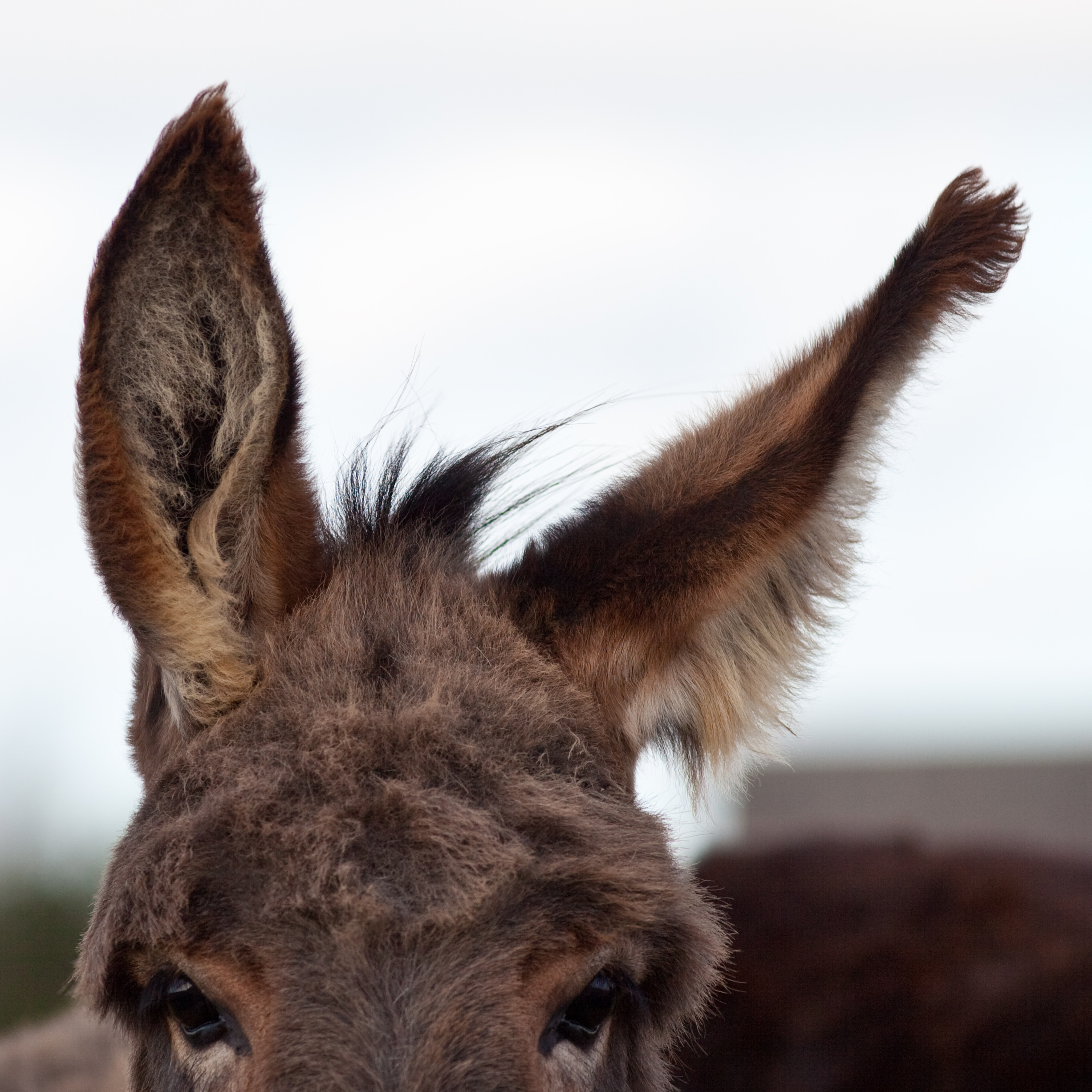
Left: Muscles of the human ear.
Right: The non-vestigial auricular muscle in the donkey can help it to move its ears like antennae.

The ears of most monkeys, including the macaque, have far more developed muscles than those of humans, giving these animals the ability to move their ears to better hear potential threats. Humans and other primates such as the orangutan and chimpanzee however have ear muscles that are minimally developed and non-functional, yet still large enough to be identifiable. A muscle attached to the ear that cannot move the ear, for whatever reason, can no longer be said to have any biological function. In humans there is variability in these muscles, such that some people are able to move their ears in various directions, and it can be possible for others to gain such movement by repeated trials. In such primates, the inability to move the ear is compensated mainly by the ability to turn the head on a horizontal plane, an ability which is not common to most monkeys—a function once provided by one structure is now replaced by another.

The outer structure of the ear also shows some vestigial features, such as the node or point on the helix of the ear known as Darwin's tubercle which is found in around 10% of the population.

=== Eye ===
The plica semilunaris is a small fold of tissue on the inside corner of the eye. It is the vestigial remnant of the nictitating membrane, i.e., third eyelid, an organ that is fully functional in some other species of mammals. Its associated muscles are also vestigial. Only one species of primate, the Calabar angwantibo, is known to have a functioning nictitating membrane.

The orbitalis muscle is a vestigial or rudimentary nonstriated muscle (smooth muscle) of the eye that crosses from the infraorbital groove and sphenomaxillary fissure and is intimately united with the periosteum of the orbit. It was described by Johannes Peter Müller and is often called Müller's muscle. The muscle forms an important part of the lateral orbital wall in some animals, but in humans it is not known to have any significant function.

=== Reproductive system ===
==== Genitalia ====
In the internal genitalia of each human sex, there are some residual organs of mesonephric and paramesonephric ducts during embryonic development:

- Gartner's duct
- Epoophoron
- Vesicular appendages of epoophoron
- Paroophoron

Human vestigial structures also include leftover embryological remnants that once served a function during development, such as the belly button, and analogous structures between biological sexes. For example, males are also born with two nipples, which are not known to serve a function compared to females. In regards to genitourinary development, both internal and external genitalia of male and female fetuses have the ability to fully or partially form their analogous phenotype of the opposite biological sex if exposed to a lack/overabundance of androgens or the SRY gene during fetal development. Examples of vestigial remnants of genitourinary development include the hymen, which is a membrane that surrounds or partially covers the external vaginal opening that derives from the sinus tubercle during fetal development and is homologous to the male seminal colliculus. Some researchers have hypothesized that the persistence of the hymen may be to provide temporary protection from infection, as it separates the vaginal lumen from the urogenital sinus cavity during development.

=== Musculature ===
A number of muscles in the human body are thought to be vestigial, either by virtue of being greatly reduced in size compared to homologous muscles in other species, by having become principally tendonous, or by being highly variable in their frequency within or between populations.

==== Head ====
The occipitalis minor is a muscle in the back of the head which normally joins to the auricular muscles of the ear. This muscle is very sporadic in frequency—always present in Malays, present in 56% of Africans, 50% of Japanese, and 36% of Europeans, and nonexistent in the Khoekhoe people of southwestern Africa and in Melanesians. Other small muscles in the head associated with the occipital region and the post-auricular muscle complex are often variable in their frequency.

The platysma, a quadrangular (four sides) muscle in a sheet-like configuration, is a vestigial remnant of the panniculus carnosus of animals. In horses, it is the muscle that allows it to flick a fly off its back.

==== Face ====
In many animals, the upper lip and sinus area is associated with whiskers or vibrissae which serve a sensory function. In humans, these whiskers do not exist but there are still sporadic cases where elements of the associated vibrissal capsular muscles or sinus hair muscles can be found. Based on histological studies of the upper lips of 20 cadavers, Tamatsu et al. found that structures resembling such muscles were present in 35% (7/20) of their specimens.

==== Arm ====
The palmaris longus muscle is seen as a small tendon between the flexor carpi radialis and the flexor carpi ulnaris, although it is not always present. The muscle is absent in about 14% of the population, however this varies greatly with ethnicity. It is believed that this muscle actively participated in the arboreal locomotion of primates, but currently has no function, because it does not provide more grip strength. One study has shown the prevalence of palmaris longus agenesis in 500 Indian patients to be 17.2% (8% bilateral and 9.2% unilateral). The palmaris is a popular source of tendon material for grafts and this has prompted studies which have shown the absence of the palmaris does not have any appreciable effect on grip strength.

The levator claviculae muscle in the posterior triangle of the neck is a supernumerary muscle present in only 2–3% of all people but nearly always present in most mammalian species, including gibbons and orangutans.

==== Torso ====
The pyramidalis muscle of the abdomen is a small and triangular muscle, anterior to the rectus abdominis, and contained in the rectus sheath. It is absent in 20% of humans and when absent, the lower end of the rectus then becomes proportionately increased in size. Anatomical studies suggest that the forces generated by the pyramidalis muscles are relatively small.

The latissimus dorsi muscle of the back has several sporadic variations. One particular variant is the existence of the dorsoepitrochlearis or latissimocondyloideus muscle which is a muscle passing from the tendon of the latissimus dorsi to the long head of the triceps brachii. It is notable due to its well developed character in other apes and monkeys, where it is an important climbing muscle, namely the dorsoepitrochlearis brachii. This muscle is found in ≈5% of humans.

==== Leg ====
The plantaris muscle is composed of a thin muscle belly and a long thin tendon. The muscle belly is approximately 5–10 centimetres (2–4 inches) long, and is absent in 7–10% of the human population. It has some weak functionality in moving the knee and ankle but is generally considered redundant and is often used as a source of tendon for grafts. The long, thin tendon of the plantaris is humorously called "the freshman's nerve", as it is often mistaken for a nerve by new medical students.

==== Tongue ====
Another example of human vestigiality occurs in the tongue, specifically the chondroglossus muscle. In a morphological study of 100 Japanese cadavers, it was found that 86% of fibers identified were solid and bundled in the appropriate way to facilitate speech and mastication. The other 14% of fibers were short, thin and sparse – nearly useless, and thus concluded to be of vestigial origin.

=== Breasts ===
Extra nipples or breasts sometimes appear along the mammary lines of humans, appearing as a remnant of mammalian ancestors who possessed more than two nipples or breasts. One 2021 report demonstrated that all healthy young men and women who participated in an anatomic study of the front surface of the body exhibited 8 pairs of focal fat mounds running along the embryological mammary ridges from axillae to the upper inner thighs. These were always located in the same relative anatomic sites – analogous to the loci of breasts in other placental mammals – and often had nipple-like moles or extra hairs located atop the mounds. Therefore, focal fatty prominences on the fronts of human torsos likely represent chains of vestigial breasts composed of primordial breast fat.

== Behavioral ==
Humans also bear some vestigial behaviors and reflexes.

=== Goose bumps ===
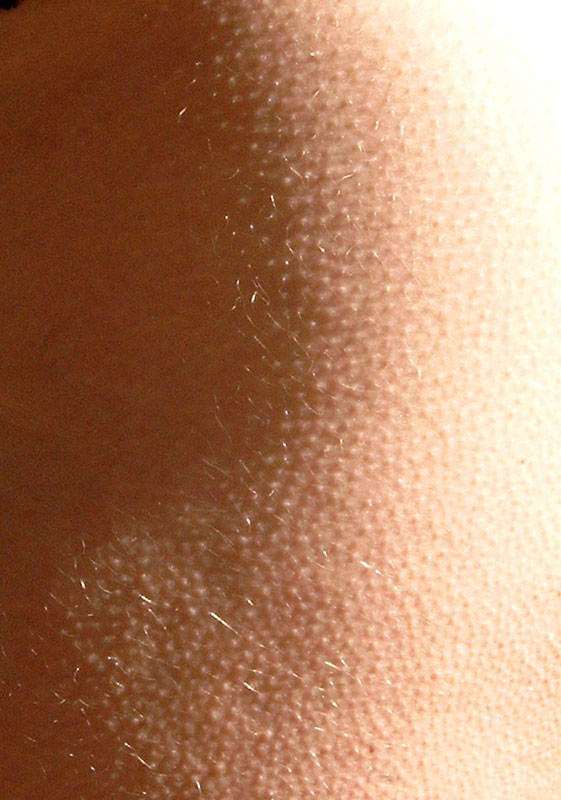
Goose bumps are an example of a vestigial human reaction to stress.

The formation of goose bumps in humans under stress is a vestigial reflex; a possible function in the distant evolutionary ancestors of humanity was to raise the body's hair, making the ancestor appear larger and scaring off predators. Raising the hair is also used to trap an extra layer of air, keeping an animal warm. Due to the diminished amount of hair in humans, the reflex formation of goose bumps when cold is also vestigial.

=== Palmar grasp reflex ===
The palmar grasp reflex is thought to be a vestigial behavior in human infants. When placing a finger or object to the palm of an infant, it will securely grasp it. This grasp is found to be rather strong. Some infants—37% according to a 1932 study—are able to support their own weight from a rod, although there is no way they can cling to their mother. The grasp is also evident in the feet. When a baby is sitting down, its prehensile feet assume a curled-in posture, similar to that observed in an adult chimp. An ancestral primate would have had sufficient body hair to which an infant could cling, unlike modern humans, thus allowing its mother to escape from danger, such as climbing up a tree in the presence of a predator without having to occupy her hands holding her baby.

=== Hiccup ===
It has been proposed that the hiccup is an evolutionary remnant of earlier amphibian respiration. Amphibians such as tadpoles gulp air and water across their gills via a rather simple motor reflex akin to mammalian hiccuping. The motor pathways that enable hiccuping form early during fetal development, before the motor pathways that enable normal lung ventilation form. Additionally, hiccups and amphibian gulping are inhibited by elevated carbon dioxide and may be stopped by GABA_{B} receptor agonists, illustrating a possible shared physiology and evolutionary heritage. These proposals may explain why premature infants spend 2.5% of their time hiccuping, possibly gulping like amphibians, as their lungs are not yet fully formed. Fetal intrauterine hiccups are of two types. The physiological type occurs before 28 weeks after conception and tend to last five to ten minutes. These hiccups are part of fetal development and are associated with the myelination of the phrenic nerve, which primarily controls the thoracic diaphragm. The phylogeny hypothesis explains how the hiccup reflex might have evolved, and if there is not an explanation, it may explain hiccups as an evolutionary remnant, held-over from our amphibious ancestors. This hypothesis has been questioned because of the existence of the afferent loop of the reflex, the fact that it does not explain the reason for glottic closure, and because the very short contraction of the hiccup is unlikely to have a significant strengthening effect on the slow-twitch muscles of respiration.

== Pseudogenes ==
There are many pseudogenes present in the human genome. One example of this is L-gulonolactone oxidase, a gene that is functional in most other mammals and produces an enzyme that synthesizes vitamin C. In humans and other members of the suborder Haplorrhini, a mutation disabled the gene and made it unable to produce the enzyme. However, the remains of the gene are still present in the human genome.

== See also ==
- Color blindness
- Deprecation
- Myopia
