= Plica semilunaris of conjunctiva =

Small fold of mucous membrane in the eye

Plica semilunaris of the conjunctiva
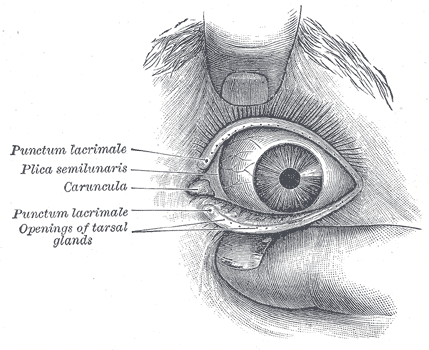
- Front of left eye with eyelids separated to show medial canthus. (Plica semilunaris labeled at center left.)

Details

Identifiers
- Latin: plica semilunaris conjunctivae
- TA98: A15.2.07.048
- TA2: 6841
- FMA: 59045

The plica semilunaris is a small fold of bulbar conjunctiva on the medial canthus of the eye. It functions during movement of the eye, to help maintain tear drainage via the lacrimal lake, and to permit greater rotation of the globe, for without the plica the conjunctiva would attach directly to the eyeball, restricting movement. It is the vestigial remnant of the nictitating membrane (the "third eyelid") which is drawn across the eye for protection, and is present in other animals such as birds, reptiles, and fish, but is rare in mammals, mainly found in monotremes and marsupials. Its associated muscles are also vestigial. It is loose, thus eye movements are not restricted by it. Only one species of primate, the Calabar angwantibo, is known to have a functioning nictitating membrane.

With ocular allergies, the lacrimal caruncle and plica semilunaris may be inflamed and pruritic (itchy) due to histamine release in the tissue and tear film.
