= Darwin's tubercle =

Congenital ear condition

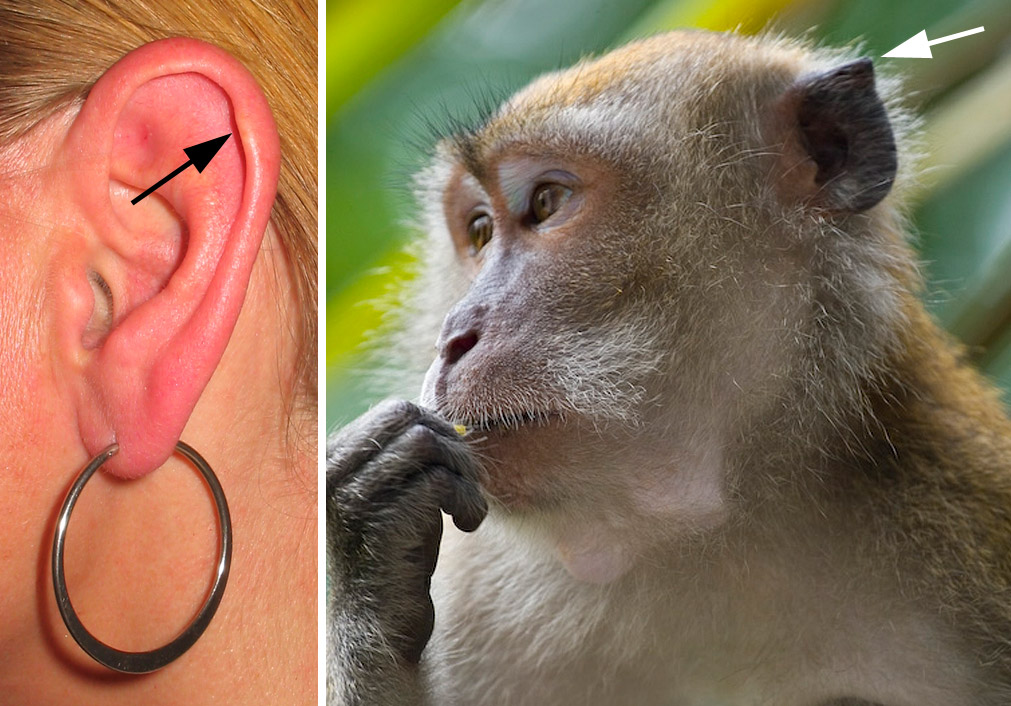
- Left: Darwin's tubercle. Right: the homologous point in a macaque.

Details

Identifiers
- Latin: tuberculum auriculare
- TA98: A15.3.01.020
- TA2: 194
- FMA: 61151

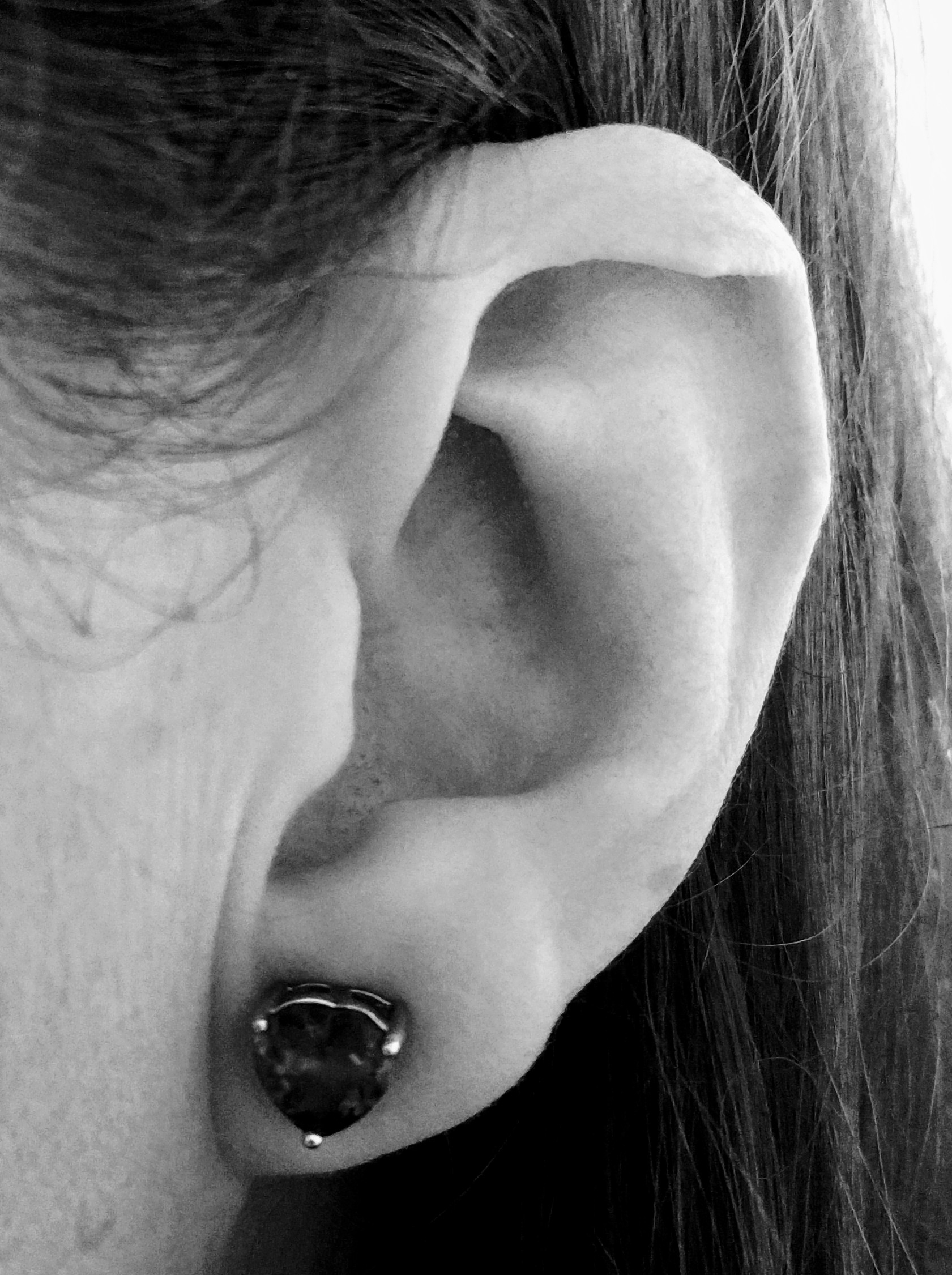
Darwin's tubercle (helix)

Darwin's tubercle (or auricular tubercle) is a congenital ear condition which often presents as a thickening on the helix at the junction of the upper and middle thirds.

== History ==
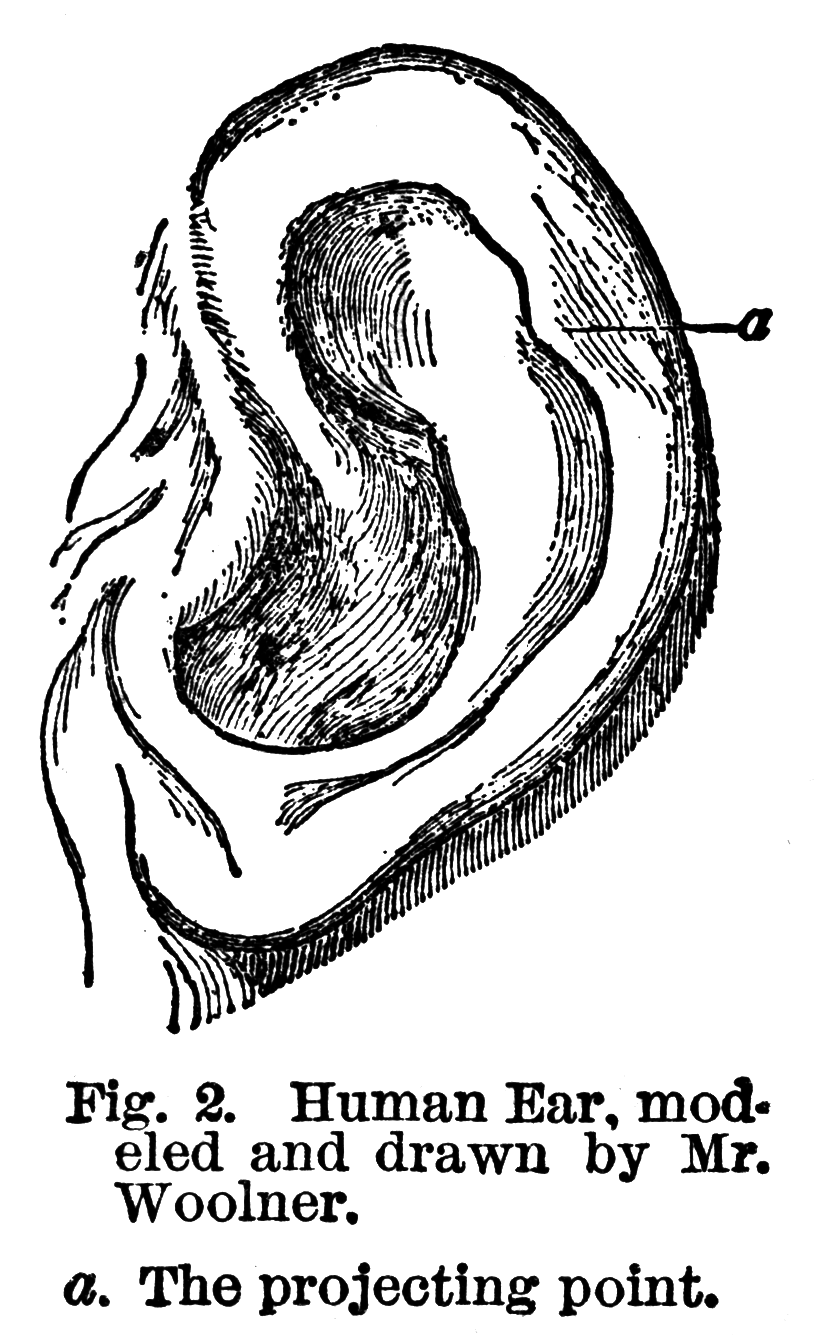
Scan of Figure 2, from Darwin's Descent of Man, second edition, illustrating Darwin's tubercle

This atavistic feature is so called because its description was first published by Charles Darwin in the opening pages of The Descent of Man, and Selection in Relation to Sex, as evidence of a vestigial feature indicating common ancestry among primates which have pointy ears. However, Darwin himself named it the Woolnerian tip, after Thomas Woolner, a British sculptor who had depicted it in one of his sculptures and had first theorised that it was an atavistic feature.

== Prevalence ==
The feature is present in approximately 10.4% of the Spanish adult population, 40% of adults in India, and 58% of Swedish school children. This acuminate nodule represents the point of the mammalian ear. The trait can potentially be bilateral, meaning present on both ears, or unilateral, where it is present on only one ear. There is mixed evidence in regard to whether the bilateral or unilateral expression is related to population, or other factors. Some populations express full bilateral, while others may express either unilateral or bilateral. However, bilateral appears to be more common than unilateral as it pertains to the expression of the trait.

== Inheritance ==
The gene for Darwin's tubercle was once thought to be inherited in an autosomal dominant pattern with incomplete penetrance, meaning that those who possess the allele (version of a gene) will not necessarily present with the phenotype. However, genetic and family studies have demonstrated that the presence of Darwin's tubercle may be more likely to be influenced by one's environment or developmental accidents than it is by genetics alone. There is no clear argument for whether the trait has significance in sexual dimorphism studies or age related studies. In some studies, there is clear data that Darwin's tubercle is not associated with sex. In contrast, others indicate that there is a correlation with sexual dimorphism between men and women, where men tend to have the tubercle more than women in some populations. Two studies indicate that older men tend to have greater expression of Darwin's tubercle than do older women.

== See also ==
- Human vestigiality
