= Shelly-sandy ware =

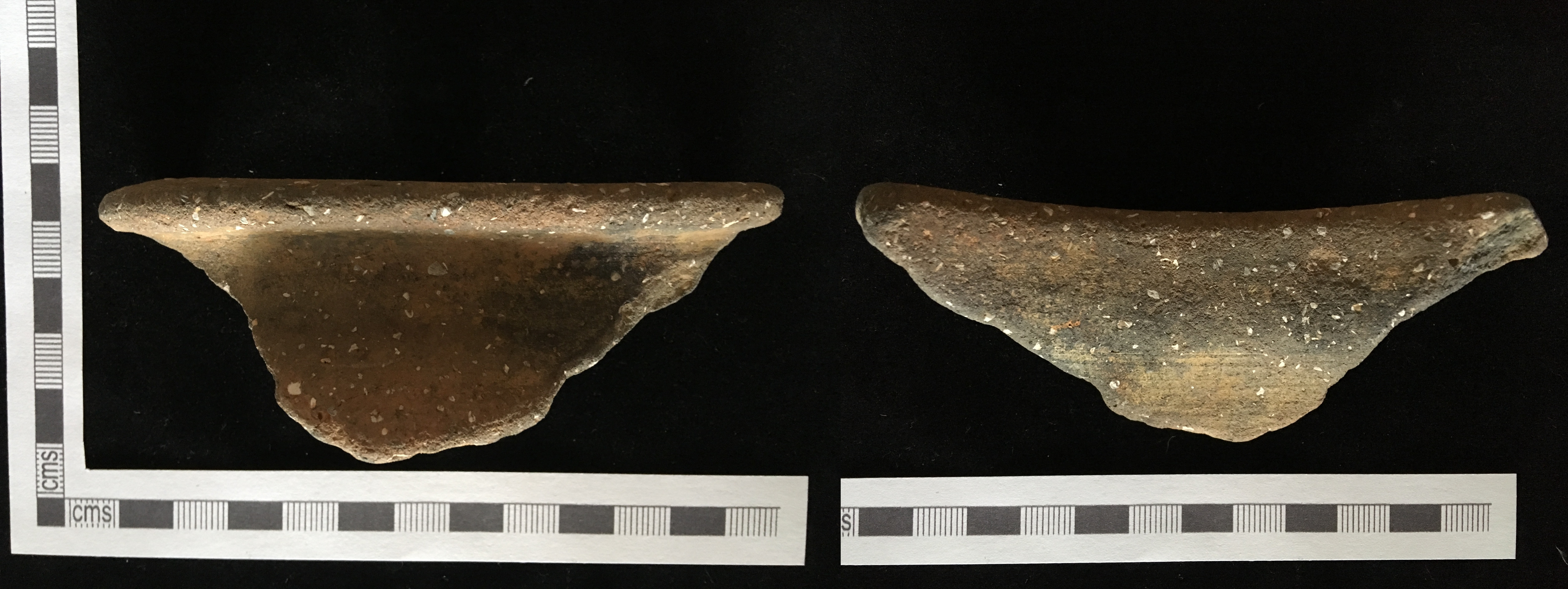
Shelly-sandy ware shards

Shelly-sandy ware (SSW) is a type of medieval pottery produced in Great Britain. The pottery fabric is tempered with both sand and shell, most commonly quartz sand and ground-up shell. The fabric is generally dark grey in colour with brown oxidised surfaces. SSW was typically handmade until the potters transitioned to wheel-thrown pottery production. The pottery was manufactured and distributed primarily from 1140—1220 AD in the Greater London area.

== History ==
Shelly-sandy ware was first produced in the Greater London area between 1085 and 1108 AD. The introduction of the mixed sand and shell ware was the beginning of a movement away from purely shell-tempered wares towards entirely sand tempered wares. The shell-and-sand tempered wares produced during this time period developed in parallel with London-type wares, primarily London greyware (LOGR). After 1140 AD, SSW became the most abundant pottery available in London, and continued to be produced until 1220 AD. The source of shelly-sandy ware has not been determined, but the distribution of the pottery was primarily concentrated in London and the surrounding areas.

== Description ==
=== Fabrics ===
Shell-tempered wares in medieval Britain include three fabric groups: entirely shell-tempered, shell-and-sand tempered, and sand-with-shell tempered. Shelly-sandy ware is defined as both shell-and-sand tempered and sand-with shell tempered wares. Shelly-sandy ware produced in the Greater London area was typically created with both quartz sand and ground-up shell or whole shell as temper. The fabric is generally dark grey in colour with brown oxidised surfaces. Undefined shell is the most common shell type found in shelly-sandy ware. Oyster shell is also common and specimens of gastropods have been identified in some pottery fragments. The shells are often worn down and stained light brown.

Analysis of pottery fragments found in archaeological excavations indicate that the clay from which the SSW fabric was created was originally rich in organic matter. Organic inclusions include wood fragments, roots and stem, leaf, and seeds. Organic inclusions were often combined with tiny crystals of iron pyrites. Quartz grains up to 0.5mm across are also included in the fabric. The quantities of sand and shell vary quite a bit in individual items. In some pottery fragments, sand grains are not easily seen. In other samples, the quartz has a more course texture.

=== Forms ===
"The range of SSW forms produced is similar to earlier medieval pottery types. Jars and cooking pots are the most common forms, followed by bowls and dishes. Curfews (fire covering, inverted bowls) were occasionally made. Deep and wide bowls and dishes were manufactured in all sizes. These items generally have the same rim form as jars and are thinly walled. Spouted pitchers were commonly produced. The majority of dishes are medium sized (240–300mm) and usually have flaring walls with straight sides. Handled bowls and dishes are rarely seen.

=== Decoration ===
Decorative elements include three techniques: application, incision, and impression. Slight horizontal bands on the pottery surface is often visible, probably the result of the pot being wiped as part of the finishing process. Applied strips is a common SSW decorative element, although the strips were probably used to strengthen the pot. Strips were usually applied vertically at regular intervals. Carved wavy lines, the quickest and easiest form of decoration, are more typically found on large bowls and dishes and less often on jars. Most SSW items have only one form of decoration, but when two decorative techniques were used, thumb impressions are always one of the techniques. Thumbing was also a popular means of embellishing the rims of the larger bowls.

== Production ==
Shelly-sandy ware was first introduced when handmade pottery was slowly becoming outdated in London and wheel-thrown pottery was increasingly being manufactured. SSW can be considered transitional ware in this regard, as both production types were produced. Analysis of SSW pottery finds suggest that the most common method of production was to form the bases by hand. The body of the item was then constructed by hand or on a turntable. The neck and rim were finished either on a turntable or on a wheel. None of the examples found have been trimmed by a knife.

SSW generally has a reduced light grey core and margins, which become progressively more red towards the surface. The surfaces are usually a dull, light brown. The exterior and interior of the objects are typically the same colour. The pottery was fired at moderate temperatures, probably between 700—800 °C. The colour of the surface was most likely accomplished by partially removing oxygen while the pottery was cooling. Shelly-sandy ware was not typically glazed. Some pottery shards of jars and dishes have been found that have splashes of clear glaze, although these items are relatively rare.

== See also ==
- Shelly ware
- Border ware
- Sandy ware
- List of English medieval pottery
