= Stamford ware =

Type of lead-glazed earthenware

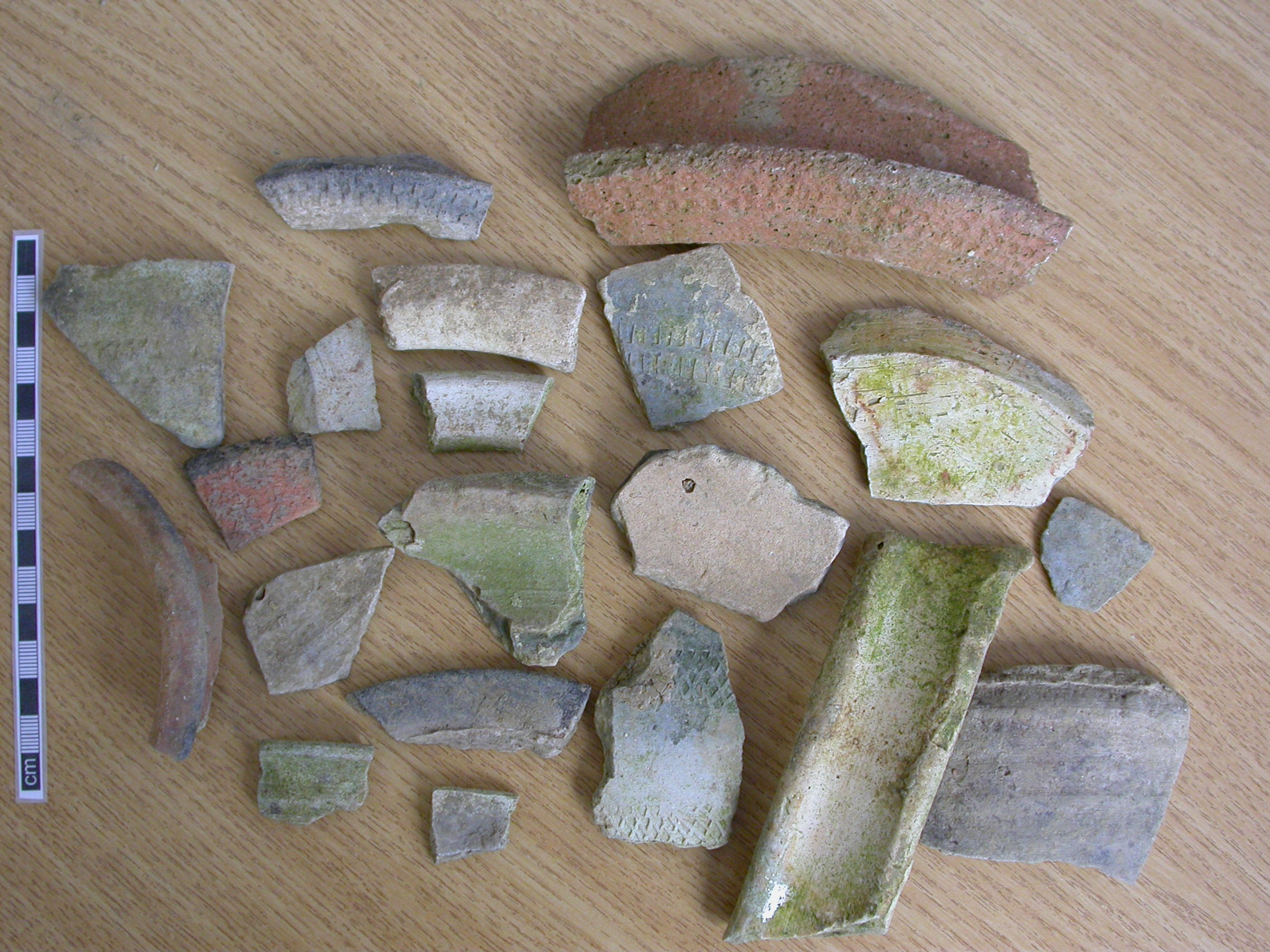
Early Medieval Stamford ware sherds, "dating to 10-11th century. The group includes many rouletted and pseudo-rouletted rims and shoulder sherds. These and an inverted rim sherd, suggest a pre conquest date". Found in Rutland.

Stamford ware is a type of lead-glazed earthenware, one of the earliest forms of glazed ceramics manufactured in England. It was produced in Stamford, Lincolnshire between the ninth and thirteenth centuries. It was widely traded across Britain and the near continent. The most popular forms were jugs, spouted pitchers, and small bowls. Distribution of Stamford ware has been used to map trade routes of the period.

Early Stamford glazes are essentially lead glazes, and it has been suggested they were unique among early English glazes as they contain traces of silver but not tin. The glaze was applied with a brush and can be pale yellow, orange, pale green and smoke blue. This depended on many factors including glaze composition, iron content and whether fired in reduced or oxidised conditions.

Examples can be seen at Stamford Museum and elsewhere.

Greenish Anglo-Saxon pottery discovered in the town in 1950 suggests lead glaze was in use in early times. A medieval kiln was found during work at Stamford School in 1963, and a much earlier one in Stamford Castle in 1976.

Various modern potters have produced work inspired by Stamford ware, including Joba in Stamford in the 1970s. No potter is currently making salt glaze work in the area.

== See also ==
- Surrey whiteware
- Border ware
- Humber ware
- List of English medieval pottery
