= Grey ware =

Type of pottery made of a gray paste

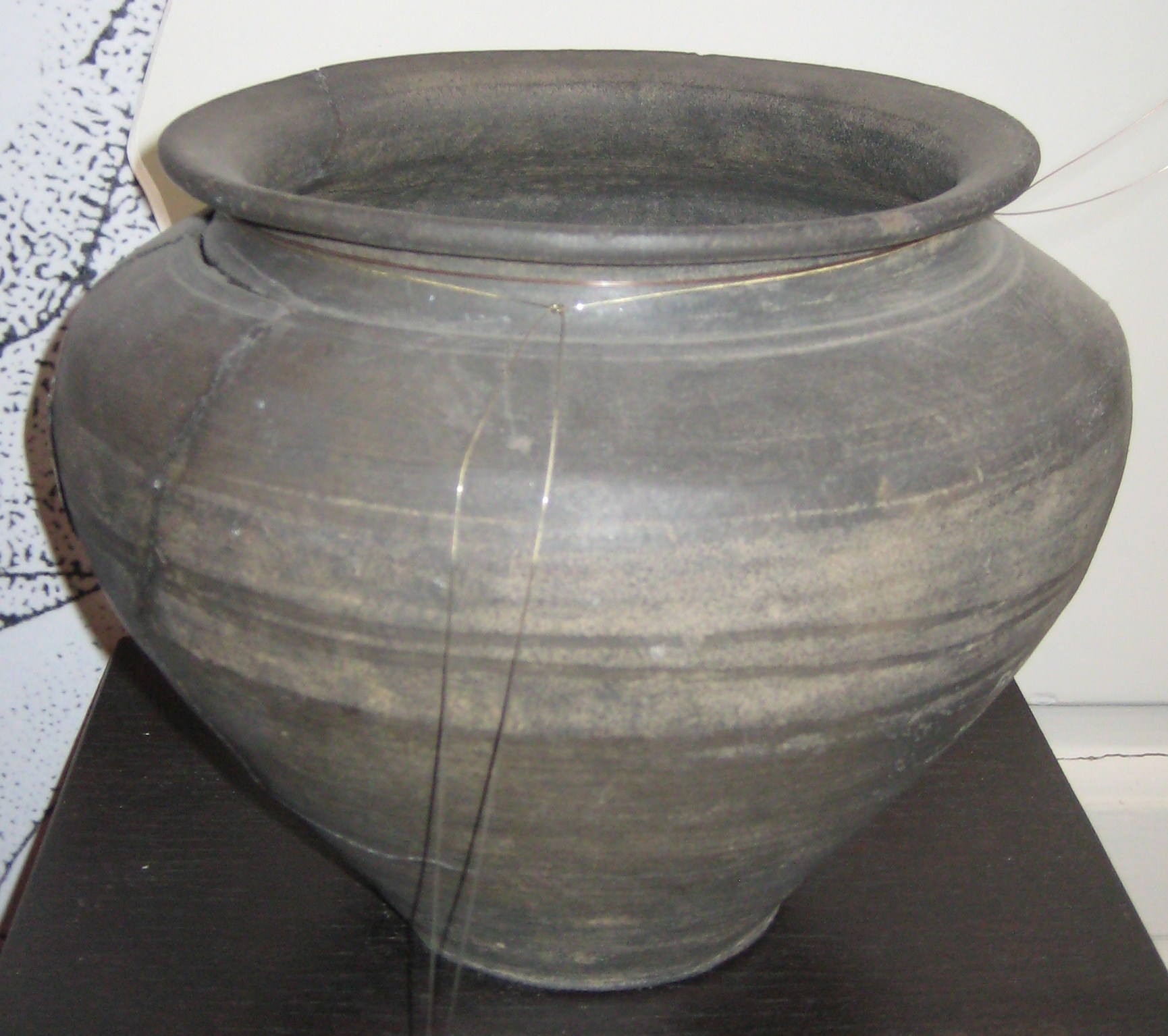
Roman cinerary urn, 2nd Century AD, UK

Grey ware is pottery with a body that fires to grey. This type of pottery can be found in different archaeological sites around the world.

== History ==
=== Prehistory ===
In Italy, grey ware was excavated in Antigori and Broglio di Trebisacce. The practice of making this pottery, which is called ceramica grigia in the mainland and ceramica grigio-ardesia in Sardinia began in the Late Bronze Age. Shards indicated that while the grey ware had similarities, there were also differences in terms of design. There are scholars who believe that the Italian grey ware was influenced by technology that originated from the Aegean.

An examples of grey ware found in Pakistan was the Faiz Muhammad Grey Ware. This was manufactured during the Mehgarh Period V and included deep, open bowls and shallow plates. The technology used for this type of grey ware was similar to the technology used in the grey ware found in east Iranian sites called Emir Grey Ware.

=== Medieval era ===
Several types of grey ware can be found in medieval Britain, including Hertfordshire-type greyware. South Buckinghamshire pottery, and Limpsfield-type ware, produced between the late 12th and 14th centuries.

== See also ==
- Painted Grey Ware culture of India
- Sandy ware
- Shelly ware
