= York Glazed Ware =

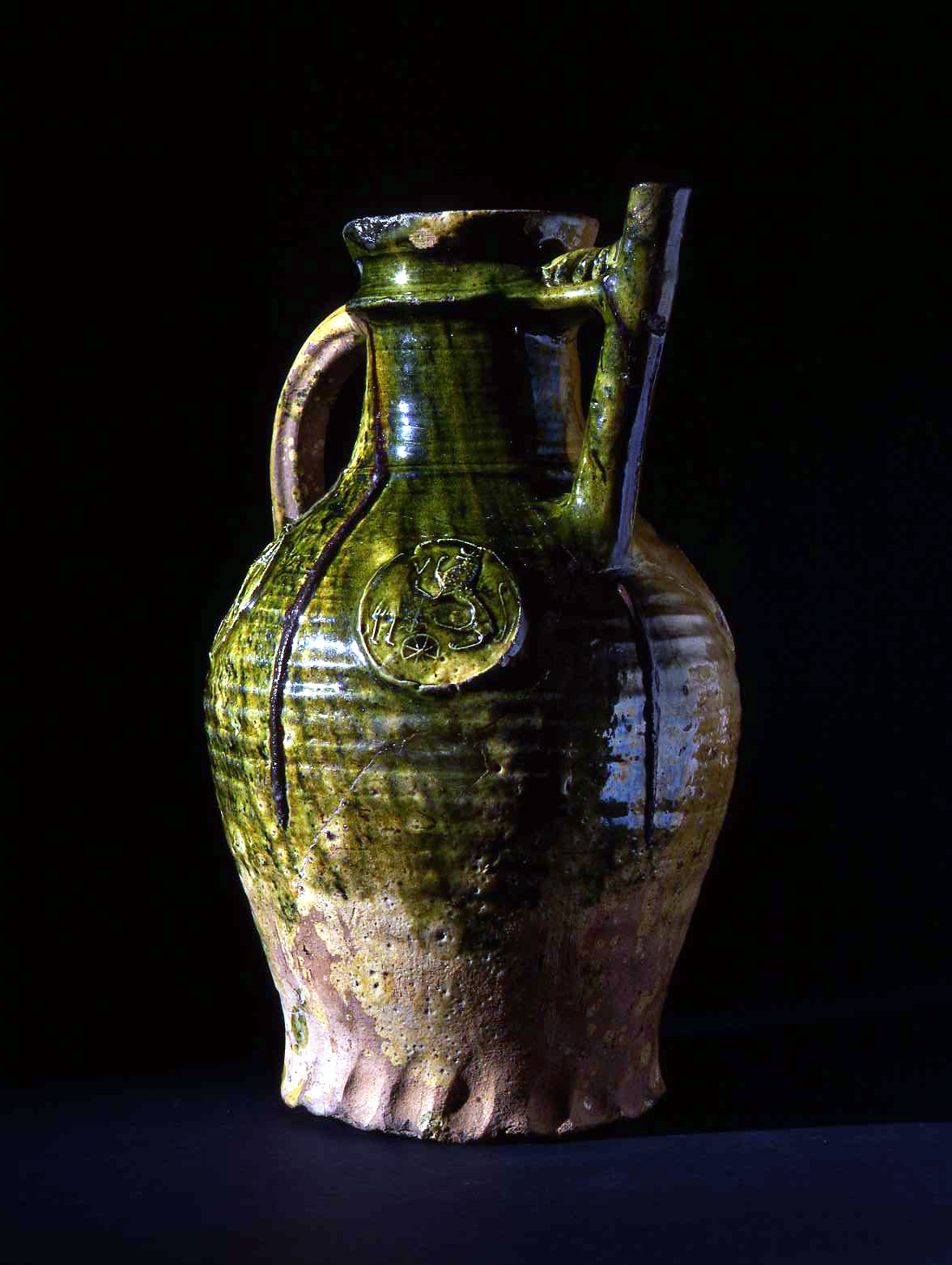
York Glazed Ware jug in the Yorkshire Museum

York Glazed Ware is a type of Medieval ceramic produced in North Yorkshire, England in the 12th and 13th centuries AD.

== Production zone ==
The name 'York Glazed Ware' comes from the initial identification of the type in York, but the manufacturing area is the Hambleton Hills, 30 miles north of York. Production dates from the late 12th to mid-13th centuries AD, after which it was steadily replaced in assemblages by Brandsby-type ware.

== Fabric ==
Although referred to as 'white ware', the fabric can be light brown, light grey or pink. The fabric has an open texture, hackly break, often with sparse to moderate quantities of iron-stained quartz included in the temper.

== Form and decoration ==
The ceramic is usually used to create jugs, some with tubular spouts, some lids, cooking pots, condiment dishes, and aquamaniles. Decorative elements include applied, incised, rouletted or combed types. The most distinctive decoration is applied clay pads stamped with seals, visible on the exterior of large jugs. The glaze is usually green (but sometime yellow), lustrous and almost metallic.

The glaze is coloured green through the addition of copper, giving a shade from "apple green to dark dark green, often with darker speckles".

== See also ==
- History of Yorkshire
- Medieval York
- Brandsby-type ware
- Humber ware
- List of English medieval pottery
