= List of English medieval pottery =

English medieval pottery was produced in Britain from the sixth to the late fifteenth centuries AD. During the sixth to the eighth centuries, pottery was handmade locally and fired in a bonfire. Common pottery fabrics consisted of clay tempered with sand or shell, or a mix of sand and shell. Pottery forms were common items used for cooking and storage, and were undecorated or decorated simply with incised lines. By the eighth century, the slow wheel was being used by local craftsmen to finish pots. By the late ninth century, potters in urban areas started to mass-produce their products. A larger variety of forms were being made and decorated in new ways. During the tenth century, potters began transitioning to a fast wheel and firing pots in kilns. Grooved lines, thumbed-applied strips, stamping and rouletting were commonly used decorations. From the thirteenth to the fifteenth centuries, glazed and slip pottery appeared more frequently in the marketplace, along with new fabric colours and decorations, and a large number of new forms.

== List of English medieval pottery ==
This is a partial list of English medieval pottery.

Pottery Name	Time period	Characteristics	Origin	Image
Brandsby-type ware	13th to 14th centuries AD	Finer and sandier, more hard-fired than the earlier York Glazed Ware	Brandsby, North Yorkshire	
Coarse border ware	Late 13th to mid 14th centuries AD	Later class of Surrey whiteware	Surrey-Hampshire border area	
Deritend ware	12th to 13th centuries AD	Three types: Glazed, Reduced and Deritend cooking pot ware	Birmingham	
Ham Green Pottery	Early 12th to mid 13th centuries AD	Two types of decorated jugs: earlier yellow-splashed plain glaze and a later more green glaze	Somerset	
Humber ware	Late 13th to early 16th centuries AD	Hard-fired, iron-rich usually red-bodied wares	North Yorkshire	
Ipswich ware	Early 8th to 9th centuries AD	Hard, sandy grey ware made in both a smooth and gritty fabric	Ipswich, Suffolk	
Sandy ware	8th to 16th centuries AD	Includes a variety of sandy wares	South East England, East Midlands	
Shelly ware	7th to 12th centuries AD	The fabric is tempered with shell powder or reduced shell, typically handmade until the 10th century.	Thames Valley, East Midlands, South East England	
Shelly-sandy ware	12th to 13th centuries AD	The fabric is a blend of both sand and shell, most commonly quartz sand and ground-up shell	Greater London	
Stamford ware	9th to 13th centuries AD	One of the earliest forms of glazed English ceramics	Stamford, Lincolnshire	
Surrey whiteware	13th to 16th centuries AD	includes Kingston-type ware, Coarse Border ware, Cheam ware	Surrey-Hampshire border area	
Thetford ware	Late 9th to mid-12th centuries AD	Hard sandy fabric, typically grey in colour	Norfolk and Suffolk	
Torksey ware	Late 9th to 11th centuries AD	Grey or black coloured surface and oxidised red or reddish-brown cores.	Lincolnshire	
York Glazed Ware	12th to 13th centuries AD	The fabric has an open texture and can be light grey, light brown or pink	Hambleton Hills, Yorkshire	
