= Shelly ware =

British type of seventh to twelfth-century pottery

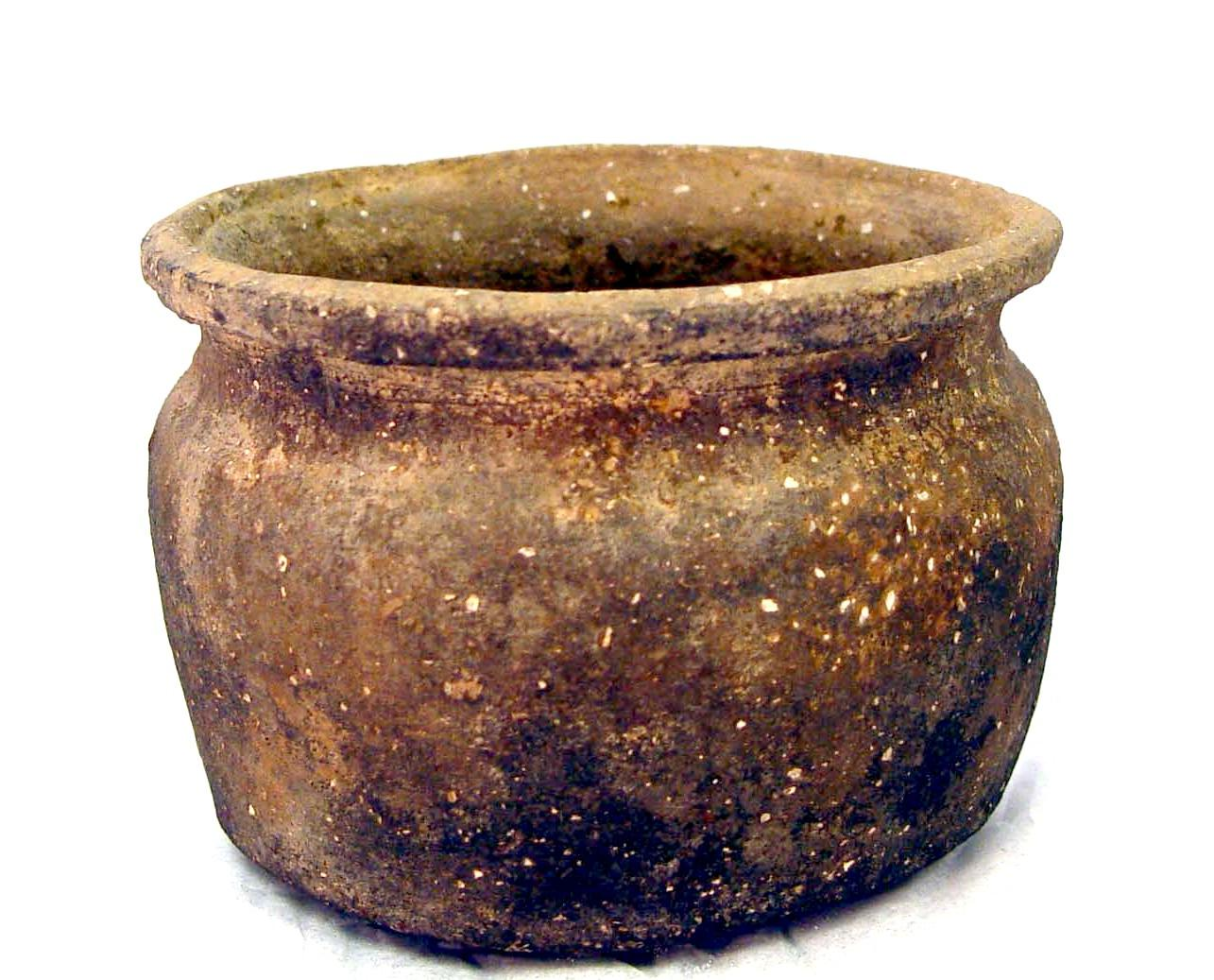
Late Saxon Shelly ware

Shelly ware is a type of pottery found in Great Britain from the seventh through the twelfth centuries. Shelly ware includes Late Saxon shelly ware, early medieval shelly ware, and Lincolnshire shelly wares. The pottery fabric is tempered with shell powder or reduced shell. Shelly ware was typically handmade until the tenth century, when potters transitioned to wheel-thrown pottery. Shelly wares were manufactured and distributed in the Upper Thames Valley, southeastern coastal areas of Britain and the East Midlands.

== History ==
The Anglo-Saxon era consists of three different time periods: the early Anglo-Saxon era, which spans the mid-fifth to the beginning of the seventh century; the middle Anglo-Saxon era, which covers the seventh thru the ninth centuries; and the late Anglo-Saxon era, which includes the tenth and eleventh centuries. The early medieval period for pottery in Britain begins in 1066, from the Norman Conquest, and ends at the close of the 12th century.

During the early and middle Anglo-Saxon era in southeast England, sandy wares, organic tempered ware, imported grey wares and a small number of Ipswich wares were commonly found. Shell-tempered ware, often referred to as "Shelly wares" first appeared in the area in the seventh century and continued to be used until the end of the ninth century.

Late Saxon Shelly Ware was manufactured in the Upper Thames Valley and distributed over a widespread area, including London. Shell-tempered ware was used extensively in London from the late ninth century to the early eleventh century when it suddenly disappeared. In the last quarter of the tenth century, a small amount of Early Medieval Sandy ware was in common use, along with Late Saxon Shelly ware. Shelly ware evolved into the Early Medieval Shelly-Sandy ware of the eleventh century.

In the East Midlands, Shelly wares were typically manufactured and distributed locally. Lincolnshire Shelly wares includes Lincolnshire Late Saxon Shelly ware and Lincolnshire Kiln type Shelly ware, which date from the late ninth to the late tenth centuries, and Early Lincoln shelly ware, which dates from the 10th to 11th centuries.

== Description ==
Shelly wares refer to several types of shell tempered wares found during the Anglo-Saxon and early medieval era in Britain. The pottery can be divided into several groups characterized by region and time period. Shelly ware fabric is tempered with crushed marine shell or fossil shell, depending upon the location of the source of shell. Shelly ware was typically handmade and fired on a bonfire until the early tenth century. By the middle of the tenth century, wheel thrown production was replacing hand made pottery manufacturing in the east midlands, Upper Thames Valley, and southeastern england.

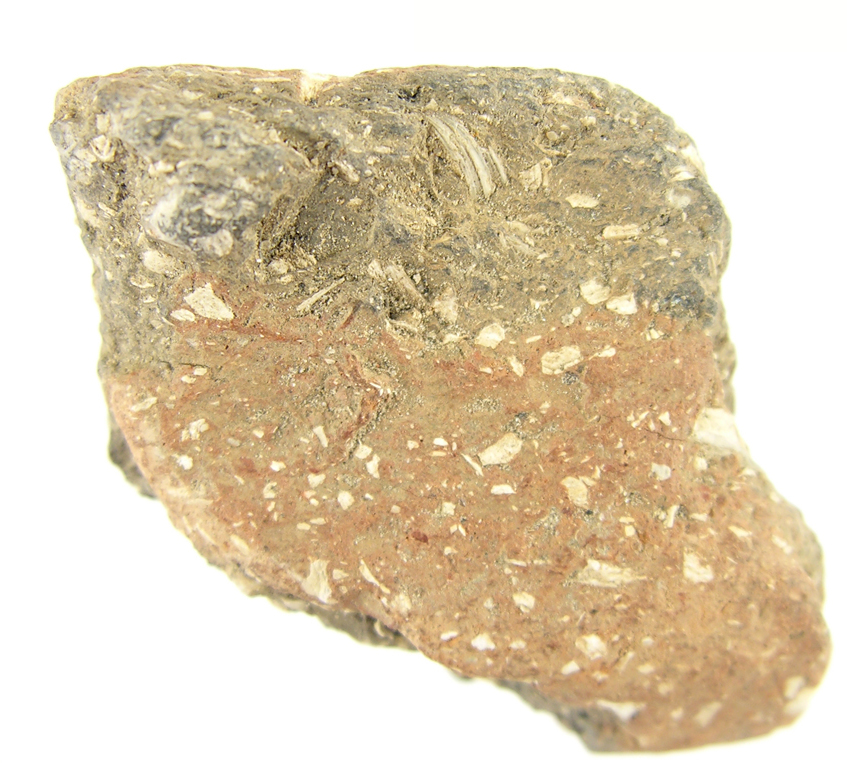
An early Medieval pottery rim sherd from a Shelly ware jar

Late Saxon Shelly ware is a pottery type in widespread use in London from the late ninth through the mid eleventh centuries. The fabric of Late Saxon Shelly ware contains numerous fragments of shell, which on microscopic examination, are seen to be encompassed in a chalky matrix. The pottery has a wide distribution area in the Upper Thames Valley. It is similar in fabric to Surrey whitewares. Jars and bowls are the primary forms.

Early medieval shelly ware is similar in fabric to Late Saxon shelly ware, but the medieval ware contains shell inclusions that are generally bivalve, and the fabric often contains small quantities of flint and quartz. Early medieval shelly ware fabric is also similar to Surrey whitewares. Forms generally have thinner walls than earlier shelly ware. It was commonly used from the middle of the eleventh century to the middle of the twelfth century.

Lincolnshire Late Saxon shelly ware fabrics are generally hard with a fine texture. Fabric colours include brown, reddish-brown and dark grey. Lincolnshire Kiln-Type Shelly ware and Lincoln Early Shelly wares have a grey fabric colour with inclusions of a few shells and quartz sand filler. It is also iron-rich as well as hard-fired with moderate sub-angular sand and occasional large sub-angular quartz.

== See also ==
- Sandy ware
- Ipswich ware
- List of English medieval pottery
