= Surrey whiteware =

British medieval lead-glazed pottery type

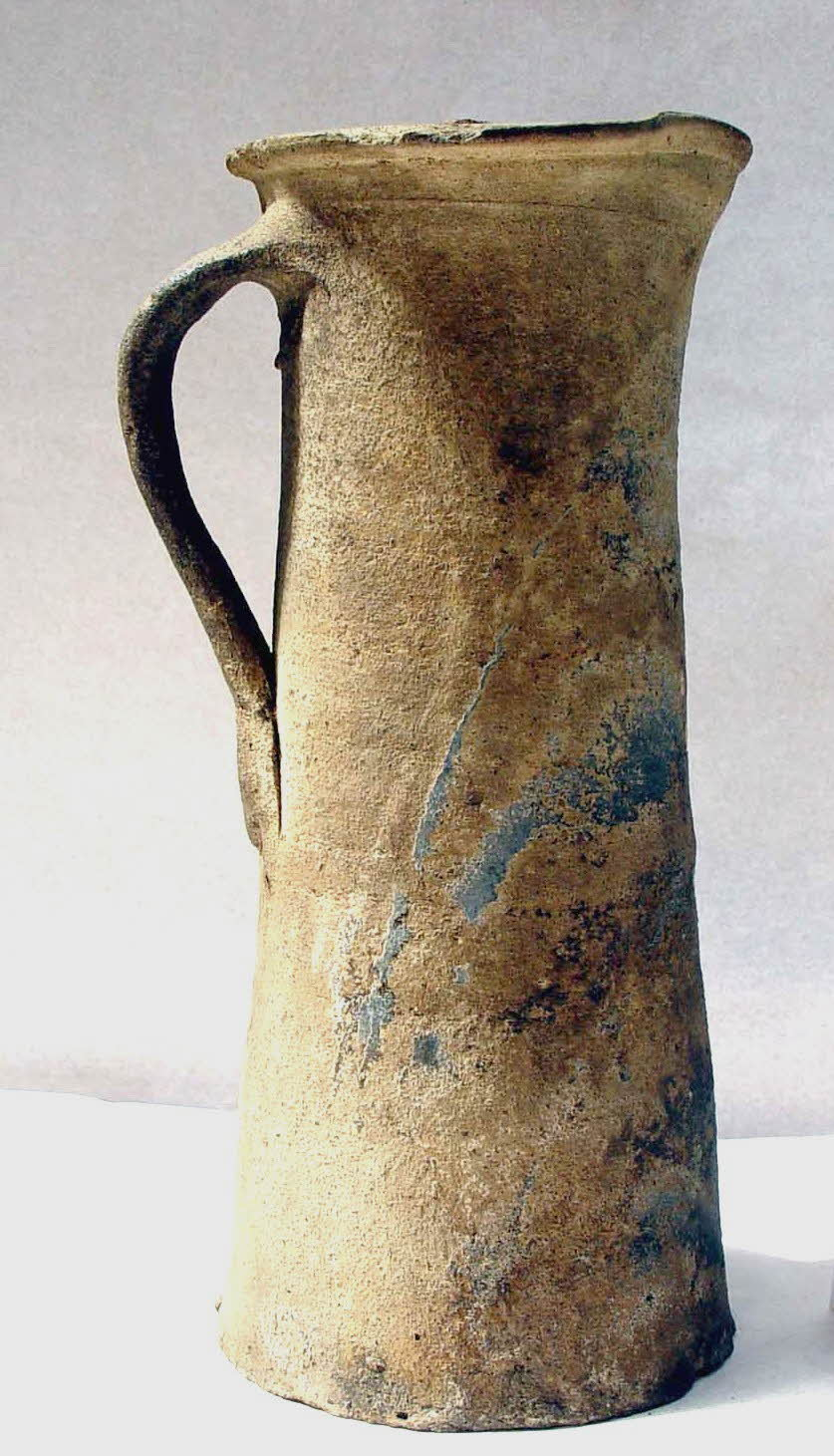
Coarse Border ware jug

Surrey whiteware, or Surrey white ware, is a type of lead-glazed pottery produced in England from the 13th to the 16th centuries. The white-fired sandy earthenware was produced largely from kilns in Surrey and along the Surrey-Hampshire border. Surrey whitewares were the most commonly used pottery in London during the late medieval period. There are four classes of Surrey whiteware: Kingston-type, Coarse Border ware, Cheam whiteware and Tudor Green ware.

== History ==
Surrey whitewares were in widespread use in London during the late medieval era. The pottery was produced from a number of kilns in Surrey and along the Surrey-Hampshire border. Three major classifications of Surrey whitewares were identified by archaeologist Clive Orton: Kingston-type ware, Coarse Border ware, and Cheam whiteware. Tudor Green ware is now viewed by scholars as a fourth, minor class. Surrey whitewares were later separated into two classes: the pottery produced in Cheam, known as "Cheam whiteware", and the pottery produced from kilns in the Surrey-Hampshire border area. This second group was referred to as "Coarse Border ware".

=== 13th century ===
Surrey whitewares first appeared in London in the mid-13th century. The pottery, similar in fabric and form to ware produced from a kiln at Kingston upon Thames, was named "Kingston-type ware". Locally manufactured pottery and Kingston-type ware accounted for the majority of pottery being used in London from the late 13th century to the early 14th centuries. Small quantities of white-fired, sandy textured jugs, cooking pots and bowls also appeared during the mid-thirteenth century in London. The green-glazed earthenware with a coarse fabric resembled pottery being produced along the Surrey-Hampshire borders, and was later named "Coarse Border ware".

=== 14th & 15th centuries ===
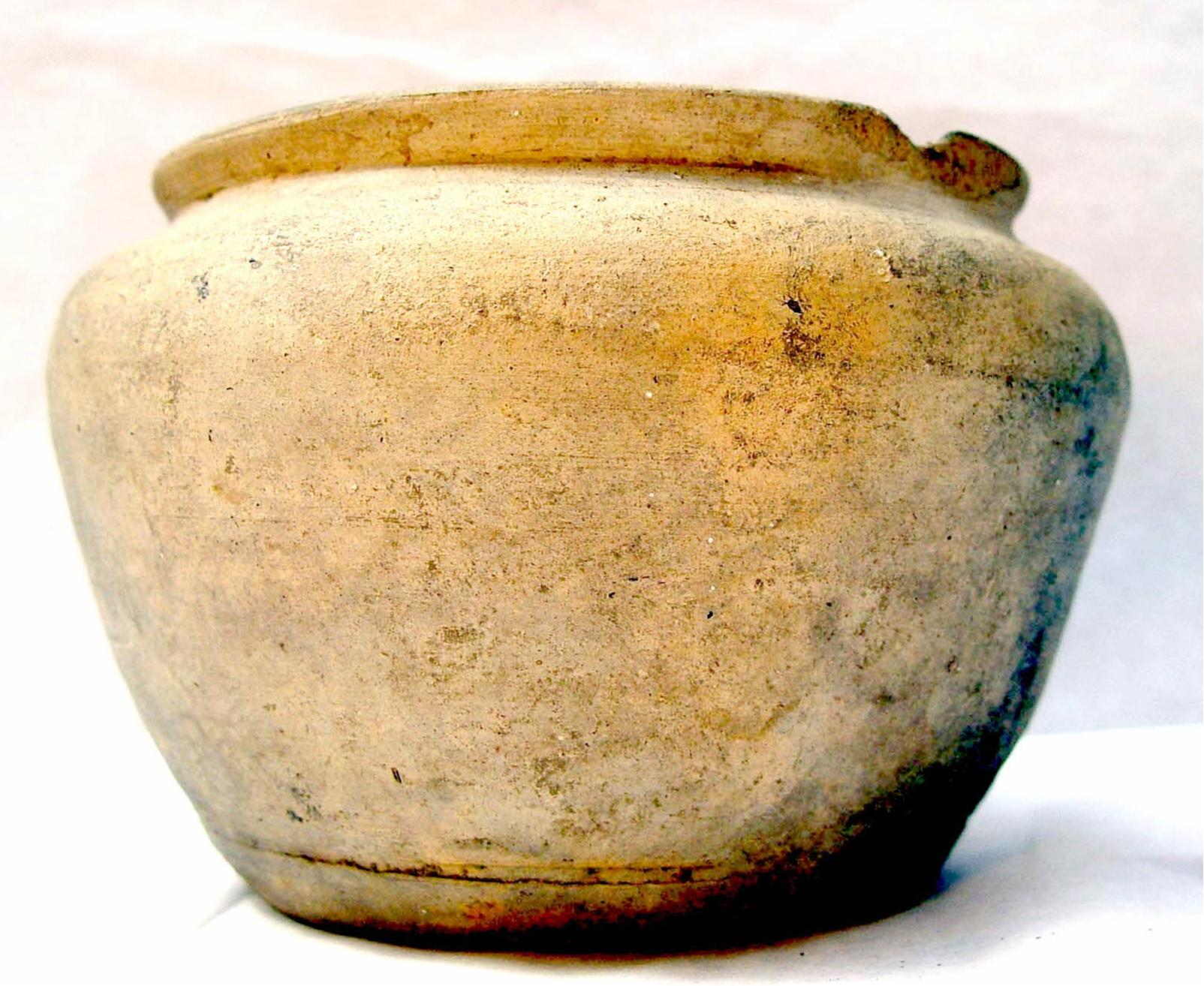
Cheam whiteware

In 14th century London, the demand for Coarse Border ware grew rapidly as demand for Kingston-type ware diminished. At the end of the 14th century, the Kingston-type pottery industry was in decline; By the early 15th century, Kingston-type ware was no longer used in London. Coarse Border ware continued to be the most widely used pottery in London from the mid 14th to the mid 15th century.

Cheam whiteware, named for the pottery manufactured from kilns at Cheam, was first seen in London in the late 14th century. The earthenware products increased in popularity in London during the 15th century. Cheam whiteware and Coarse Border ware dominated the pottery market in London and its surrounding areas during the 15th century. Tudor Green ware first appeared in the late 14th century. By the early 15th century, Tudor Green ware had grown in popularity and eventually outnumbered Coarse ware and Cheam whiteware use in London. Demand for Cheam whiteware declined by the end of the 15th century.

== Description ==
Surrey whiteware is a white-fired sand tempered ware, "made from a white-firing clay consisting of angular quartz of fine silt and sand grade, and tempered with varying quantities of rounded quartz sand." The pottery can be separated into four groups. Kingston-type ware, Coarse Border ware, Cheam ware, and Green Tudor ware. All four pottery types have similar sandy textures. The term, "Tudor Green ware" is used to describe the thin-walled, green-glazed white-fired earthenware produced during the Tudor era.

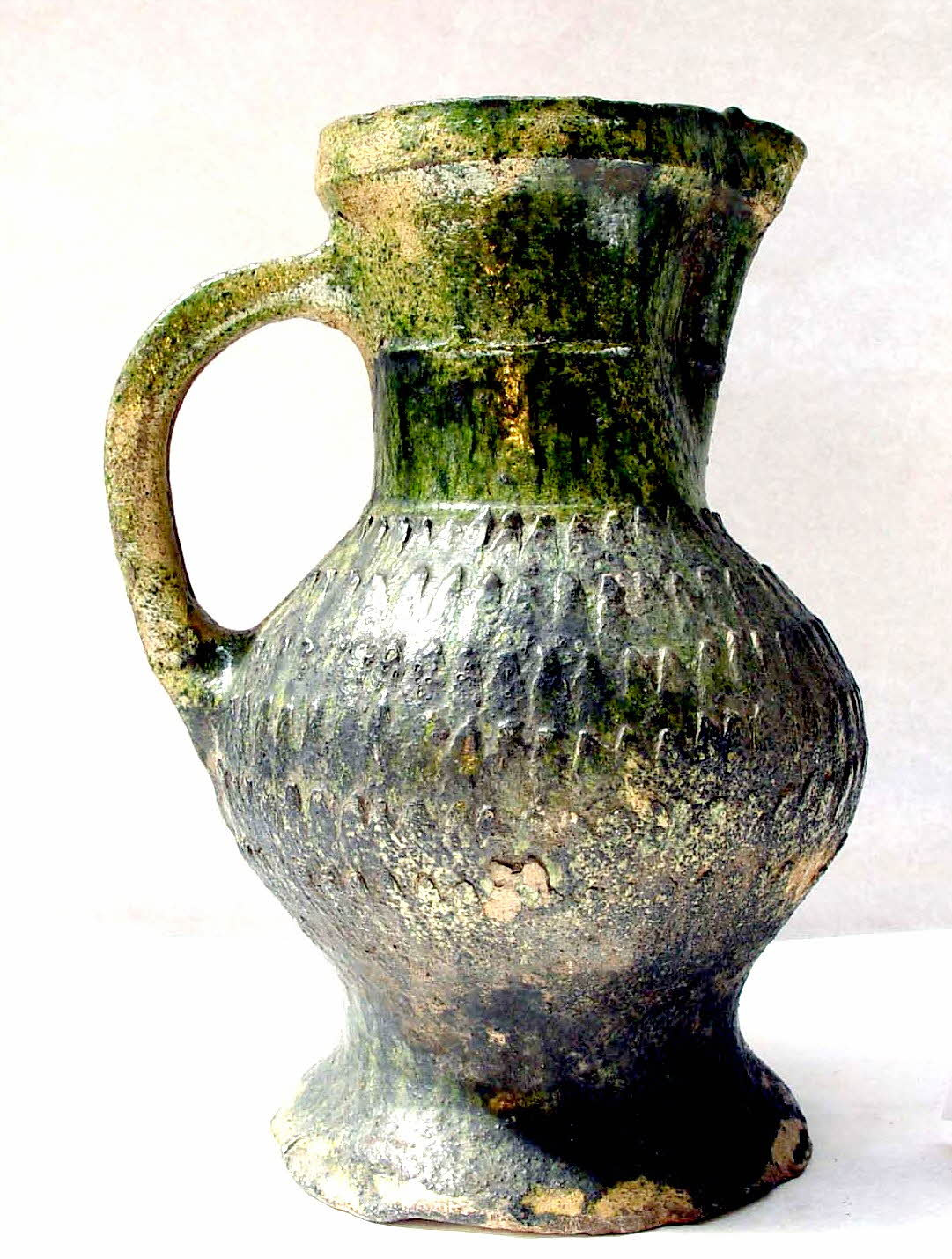
Kingston-type ware

=== Fabric ===
The fabric colours of Surrey whiteware are: buff, beige off-white, cream, and pale grey. Kingston-type pottery fabric is hard with a rough surface and a fine texture. Coarse Border ware fabric is hard with a rough surface and an uneven texture. Cheam whiteware's fabric is similar to Kingston-type ware in hardness and texture. Tudor Green ware has a fabric that varies from soft to hard, with a smooth surface and a fine texture.

The Surrey potters typically used a clear lead glaze or a mottled green glaze on their pots. On Kingston-type ware, the glaze was typically crazed and usually varied in finish from thin and uneven to thick and glossy. Glaze colour could vary from green to dark green to brown. Course Border ware glaze was crazed, with a similar finish to Kingston-type ware. The colour varied from light to dark green and was sometimes mottled. Cheam whiteware's glaze generally was crazed with a finish ranging from thin and uneven to thick and glossy. Glazes varied in colour from yellow to light green to dark green. Tudor Green ware glazes were crazed and finishes were thick and evenly distributed. Glaze colours were different shades of green and were typically mottled.

=== Decoration ===
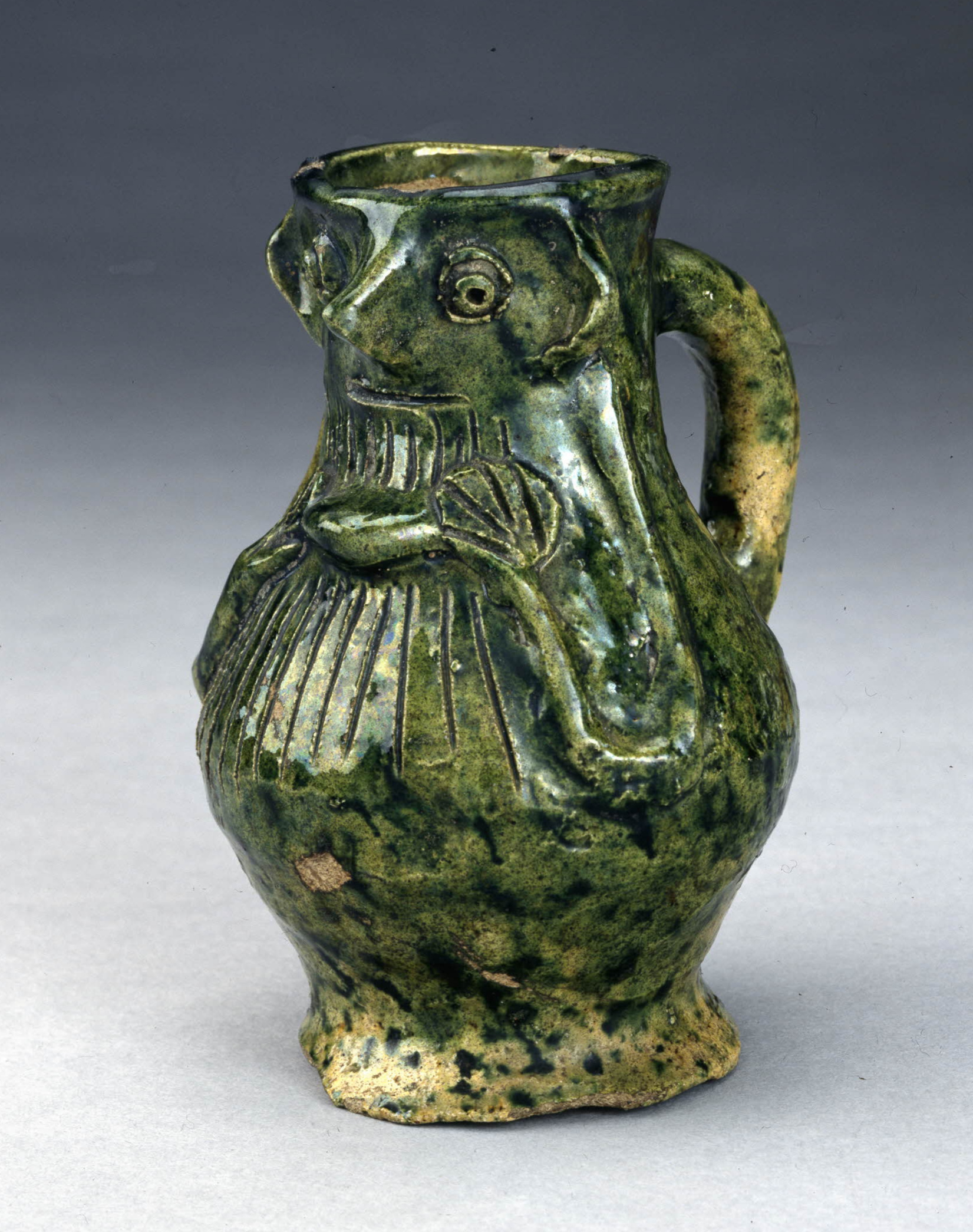
Kingston-type ware face jug

The decoration of Surrey whitewares ranged from plain and unadorned to more elaborately ornamented items. A clear or coloured lead glazed was commonly used by potters. Additional decoration techniques include one or more of the following: coating individual pieces with a white or red slip, the application of stamps or the marking of lines on an item with a comb. Stamped decoration is often found in Kingston-type ware and Coarse Border ware, but not Cheam whiteware. Other decorative techniques included the application of a bichrome glaze, yellow on the inside with a green exterior. The application of a glaze on the upper part of the pottery vessel was popular in the 13th century. The painting of simple decorations or lines was a common decorative technique.

Kingston-type ware had the greatest variety of decoration and Cheam whiteware had the least. Kingston-type decoration typically consisted of regularly spaced combed or engraved lines. The more embellished vessels generally had a lead glaze coloured green with the addition of copper. Another common decorative technique was the application of strips or bands of clay to the individual pot. More complex designs include stamped bosses, floral patterns, overlaid scales, and pinecone impressions. Anthropomorphic decorations, although not common, are primarily depictions of human faces.

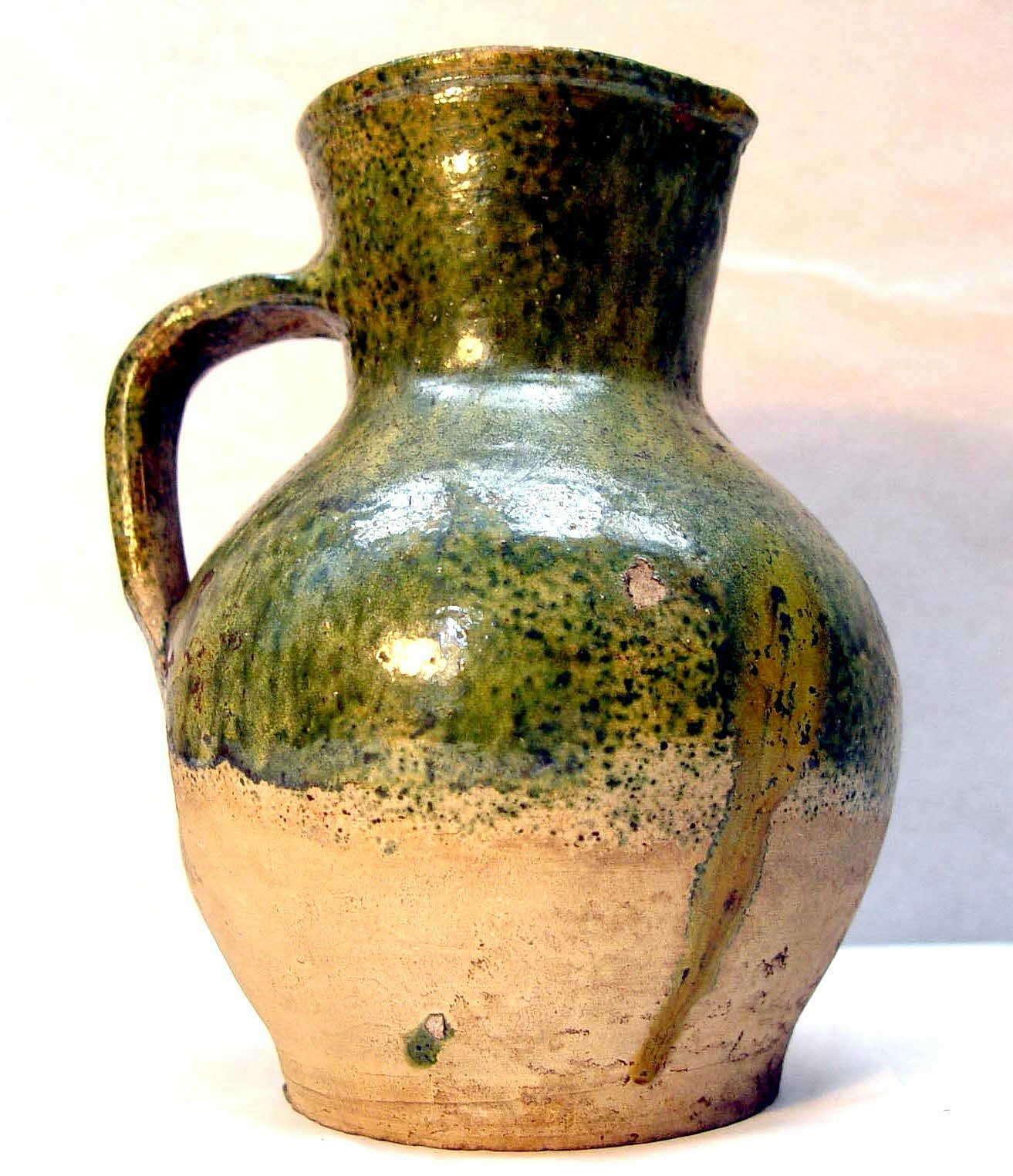
Tudor Green ware jug

The primary market for Coarse Border ware was individual households; pottery items were generally used for preparing food. The pottery was typically simple, without decoration. Besides the application of a green glaze, horizontal bands and engraved lines are some of the simplest forms of decoration for Coarse Border ware. Painted decoration was used on Coarse Border ware, primarily for cisterns.

Cheam white ware was primarily functional in nature, used primarily for vessels used for storage and drinking of liquids. Glaze was used sporadically on most pottery forms. The application of green or yellow glaze was generally applied to the upper half of the body, and internal glazing was common on the inside of the vessels used for storage of liquids. Painted or incised bands or lines were simple forms of decoration. There are fewer examples of Tudor Green ware available, due to its very fine, thin-walled fabric. Tudor Green ware is known for its green-glazing.

=== Forms ===
Surrey whitewares were produced in the traditional forms of the medieval era. These items include jugs, cooking pots, large deep bowls and pans, small bowls, dripping dishes, lobed cups, chamber pots, money boxes, candlesticks, chafing dishes, lids, pipkins, skillets, costrels (portable flasks) and storage jars.

Large jugs with cross-hatched engraving are a distinctive form of Coarse Border ware common in London in the late 13th to early 14th centuries. Cooking pots and bowls are also popular forms of Coarse Border ware. From the 14th to the mid-15th centuries, new types of pottery forms were being produced for the market in London. These new forms were typically plain pottery items, undecorated or decorated simply with grooved lines.

== Production and distribution ==
=== Clay sources ===
The white-firing clays used to produce Surrey whitewares were collected from the Reading Beds in Surrey and along the borders of Hampshire and Berkshire. The Reading Beds between Farnham and Tongham were the best source of potting clay for medieval potters producing wares for the London market. These sites had been an excellent source of clays for pottery manufacturing since the early Roman period. The northern outcrops of the Reading Beds that extend past Farnham and continue to Guildford and Cheam, also provided a good supply of white-firing clays for pottery manufacturing. Most pottery kilns were located within a few miles of these crucial sources of clay.

=== Production ===
Medieval pottery kiln sites were established in locations near the raw clay needed for manufacturing. Farnham was the hub of the flourishing Surrey pottery industry. Kingston upon Thames was most likely the earliest center of pottery production, producing whitewares in the 13th century. Kingston upon Thames is situated far from the Reading Beds; Raw clay for the kilns was probably transported to the Kingston upon Thames by an overland route or by river transport. The Cheam and the Surrey-Hampshire border potteries are positioned close to the Reading Beds.

The method of distribution of Surrey whiteware was a combination of trade at the production sites along with trade in London and surrounding areas. The pottery products destined for the London marked were probably hauled first by wagons to the River Thames and then by river transport to London. Cheam whiteware was primarily traded from the production locations or from nearby markets. In the late 14th century to early 15th century, Coarse Border ware was distributed over a much wider area than the other Surrey whiteware types. Along with the London market and surrounding area, the pottery was traded along the River Thames, as well as in Hampshire, as far south as Winchester and Berkshire.

== Gallery ==
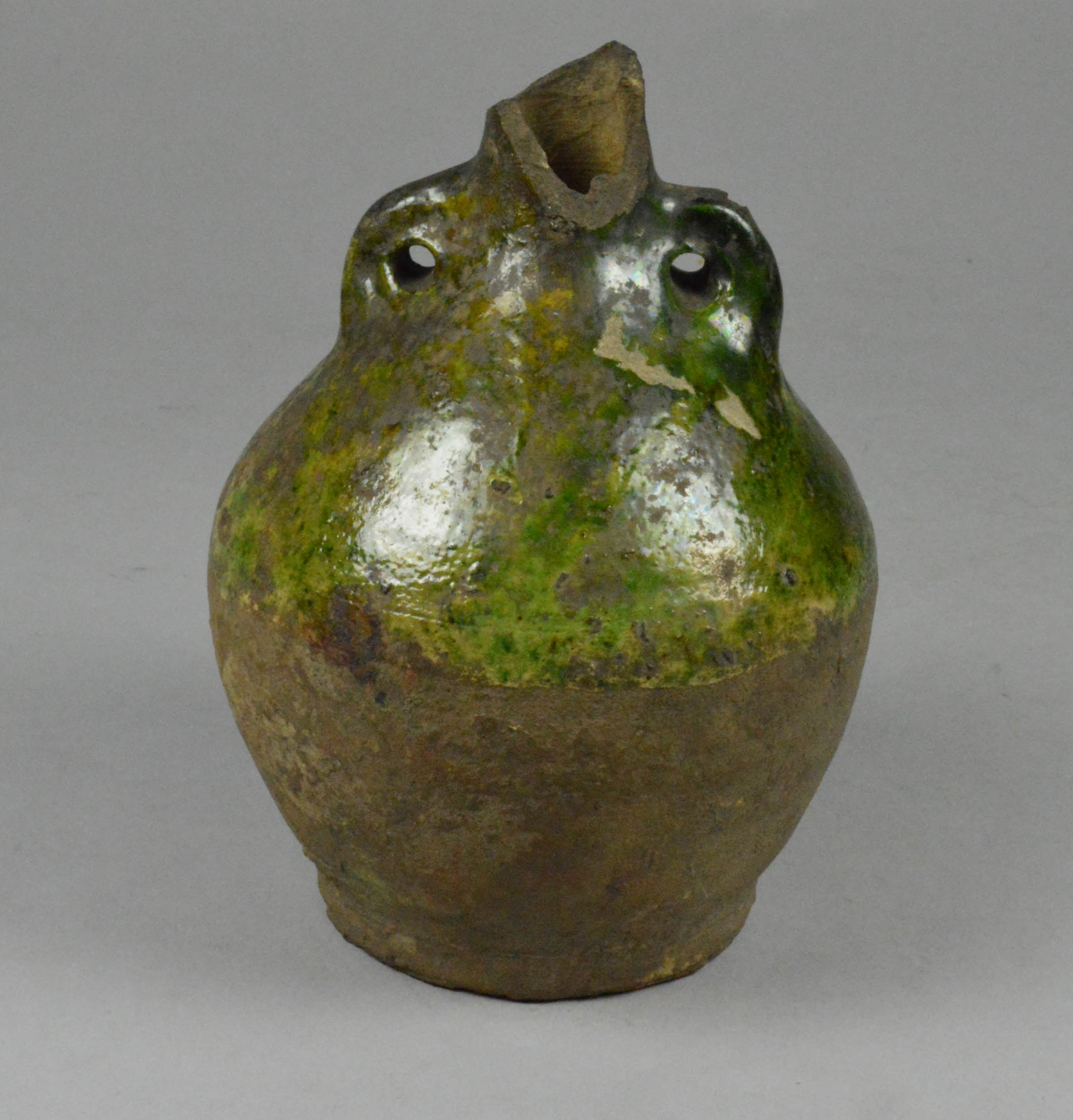
Tudor Green ware costrel

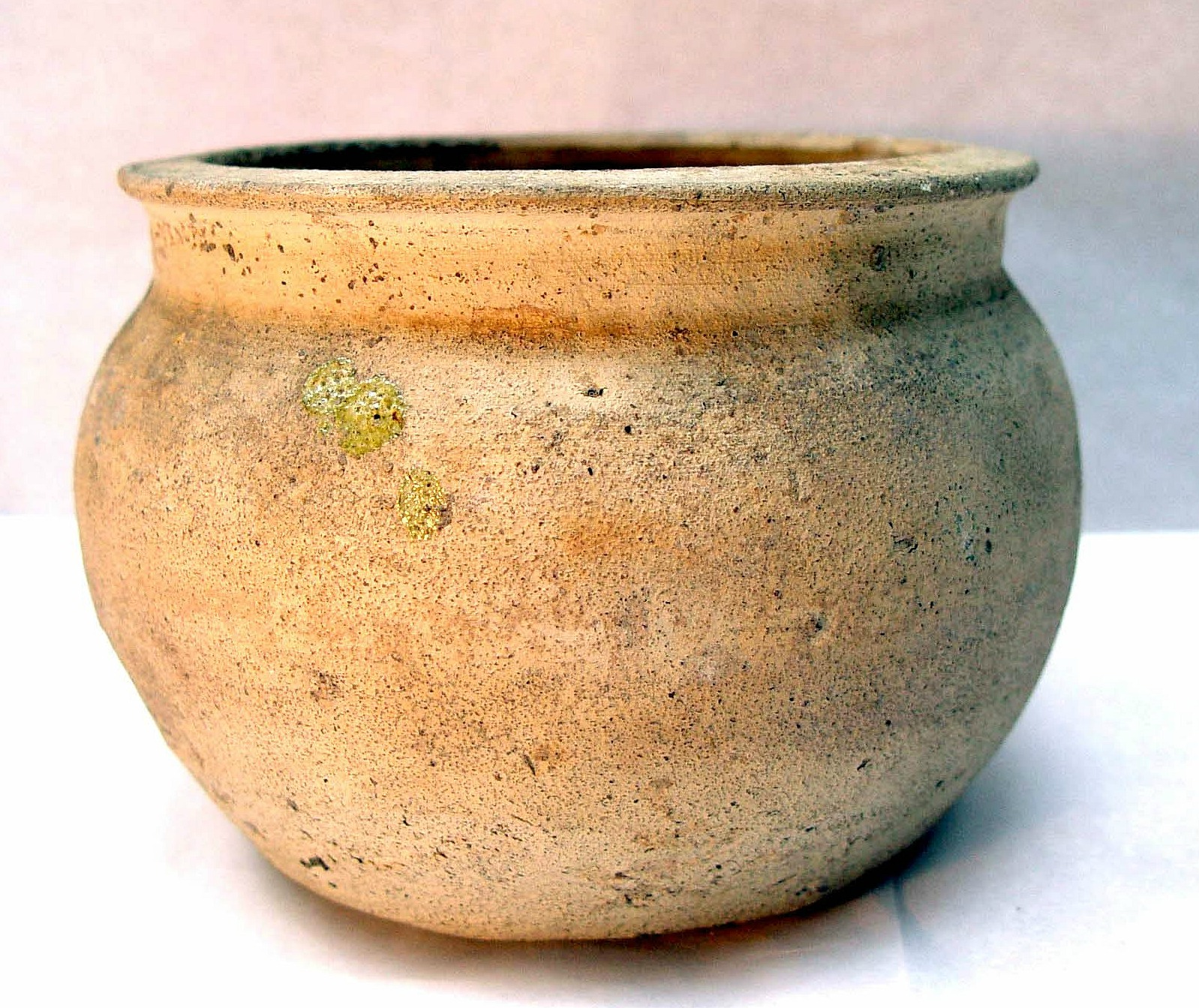
Coarse Border ware cooking pot

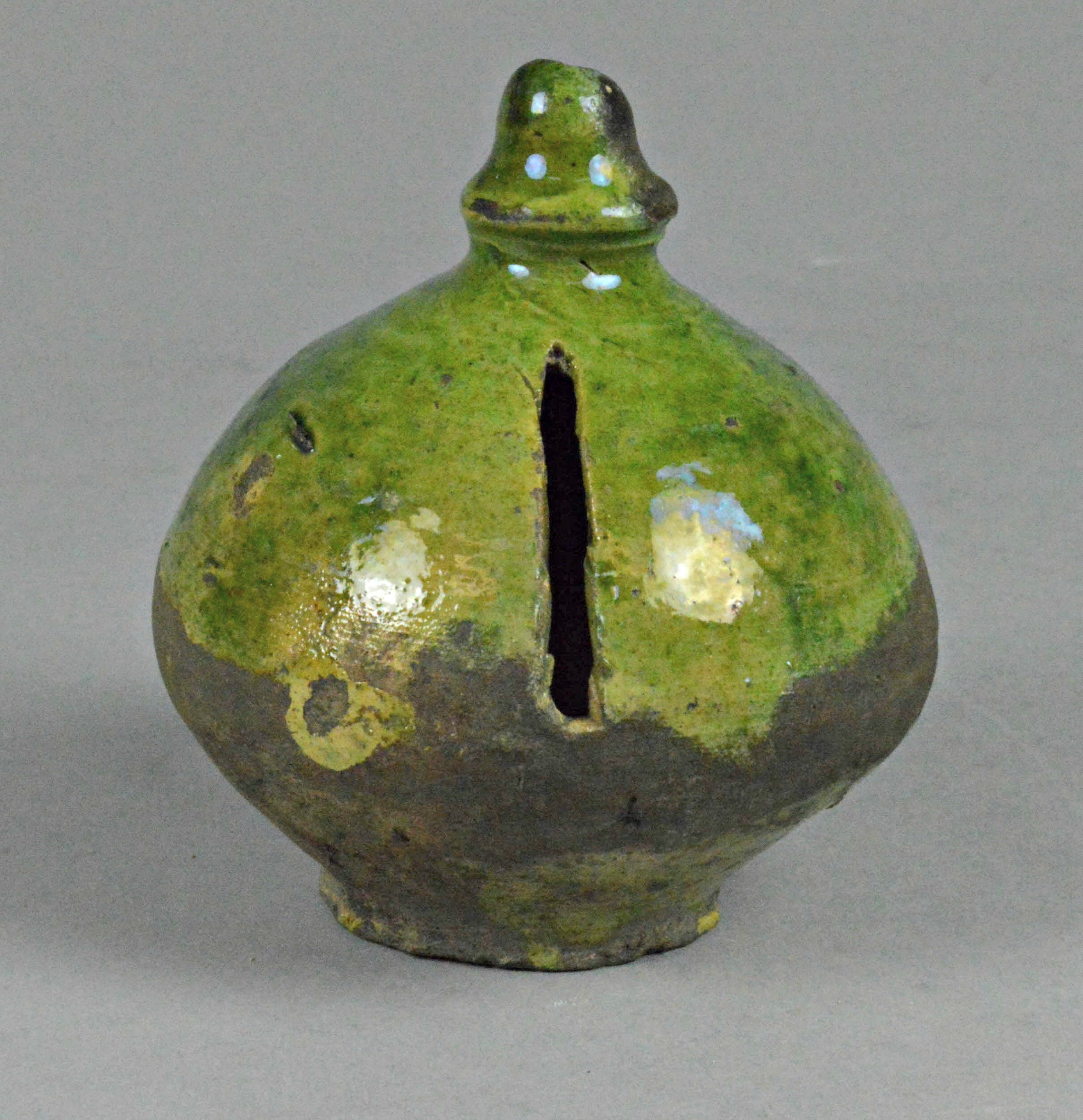
Tudor Green ware, money box

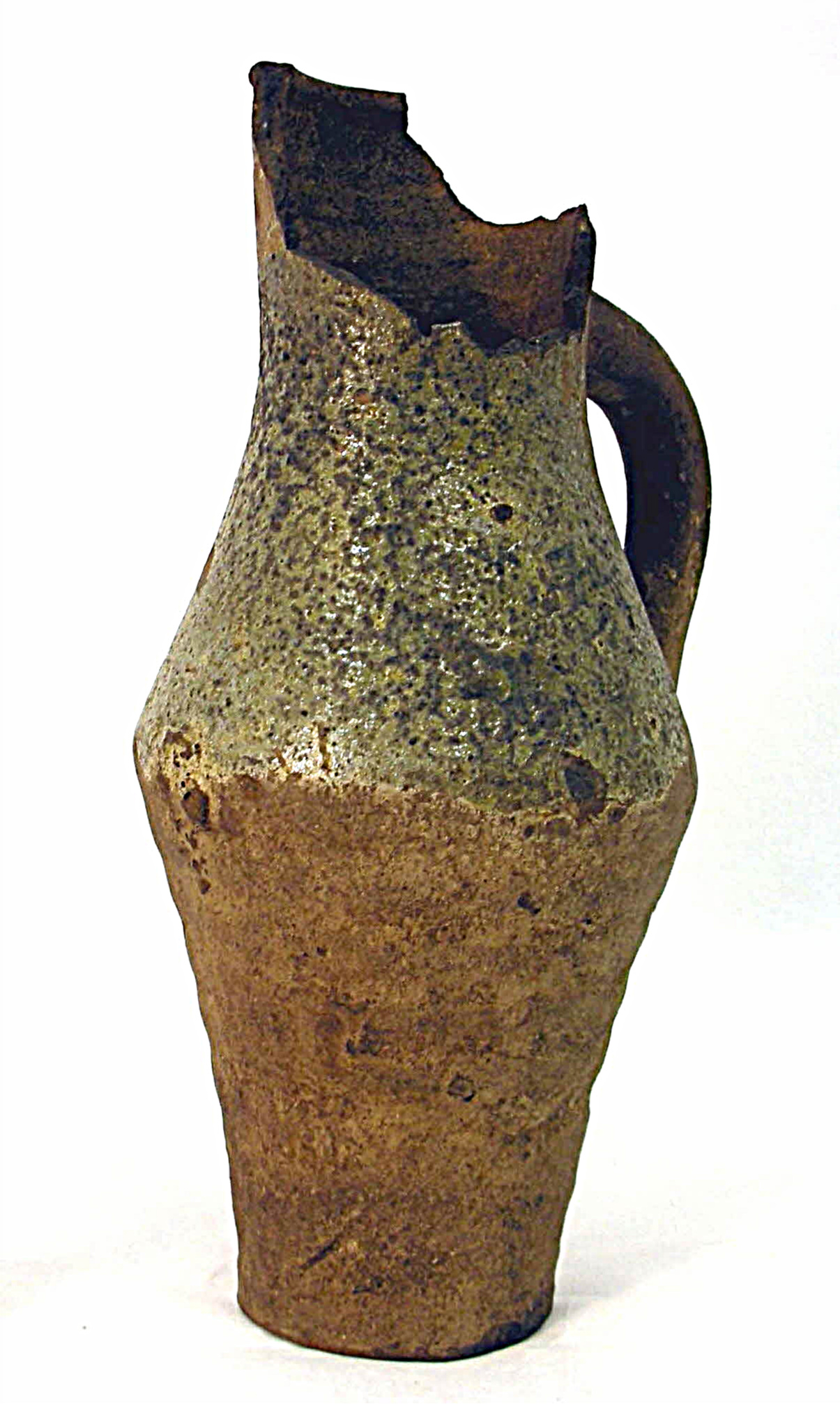
Cheam whiteware jug

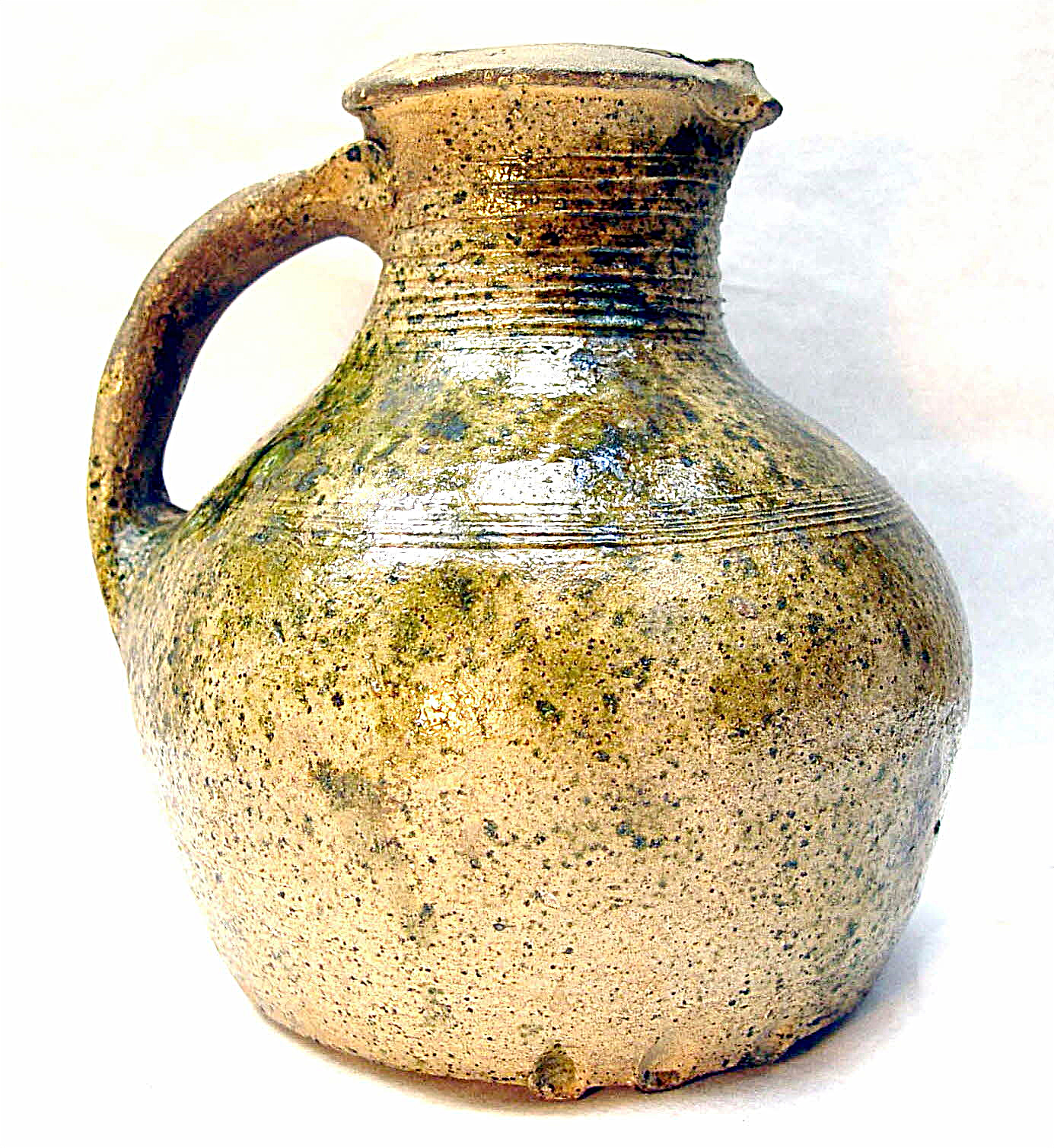
Kingston-type ware jug

== See also ==
- Stamford ware
- Border ware
- Sandy ware
- Humber ware
- List of English medieval pottery
