= Border ware =

16th and 17th century English pottery style

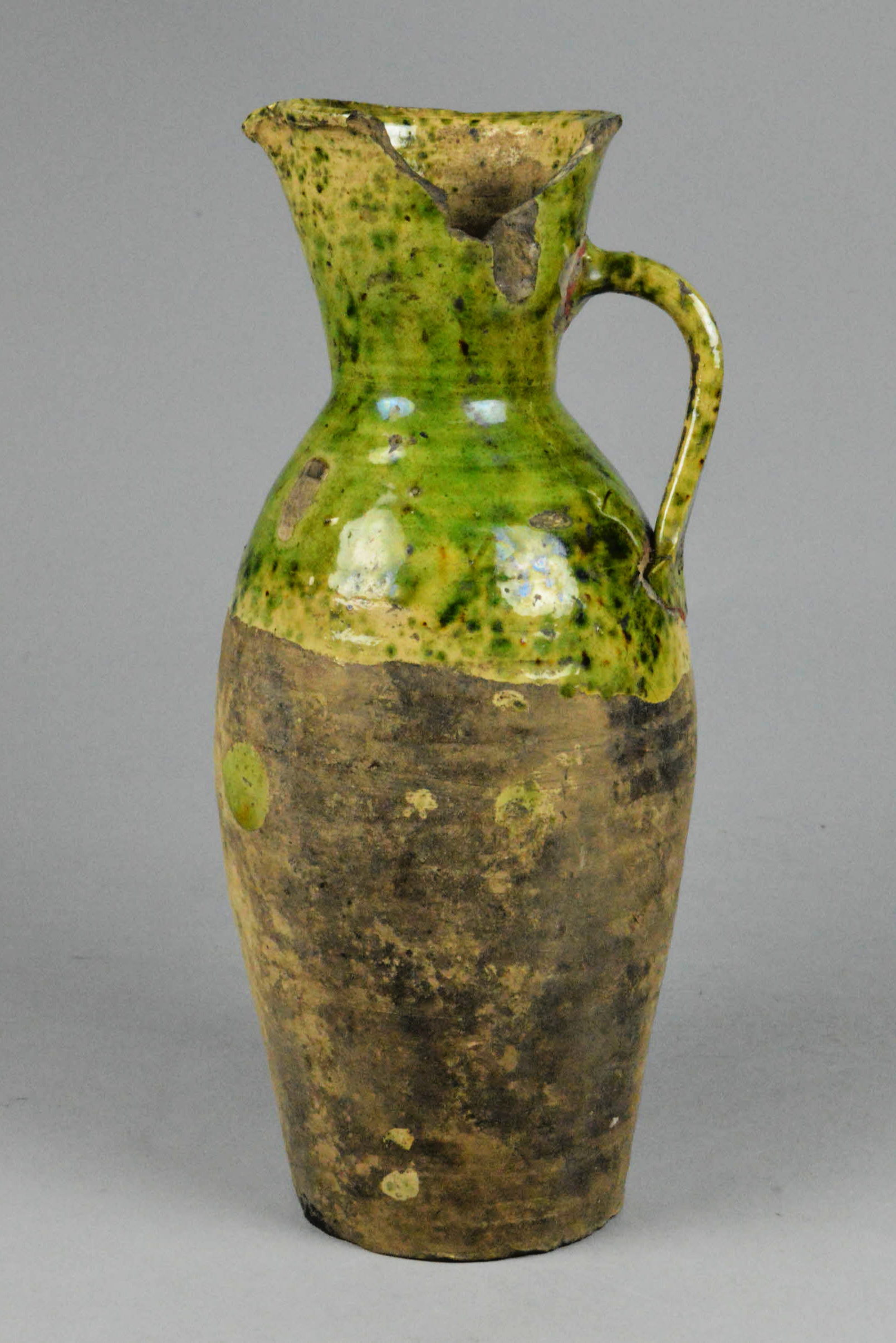
16th century Border ware jug

Border ware is a type of post-medieval British pottery commonly used in the South of England, London and then later in the early American colonies beginning in the sixteenth and ending in the nineteenth century with a height of popularity and production in the seventeenth century. The lead-glazed, sandy earthenware was produced from kilns along the border between Hampshire and Surrey. There are two classes of Border ware, fine whitewares and fine redwares.

== History ==
Border ware evolved from a medieval pottery known as Surrey whiteware. Surrey whiteware consisted of four classes: Kingston-type ware, Coarse Border ware, Cheam whiteware and Tudor Green ware. The earlier whitewares were produced from the 13th to the 16th centuries.

Border ware was manufactured in the Surrey-Hampshire border area from the 16th century to the 19th centuries, although the whitewares were produced only during the sixteenth and seventeenth centuries. The demand for whitewares declined during the 17th century while the demand for redwares increased. The production of whitewares ended most likely during the early 18th century; Redwares continued to be produced until the 19th century.

== Description ==
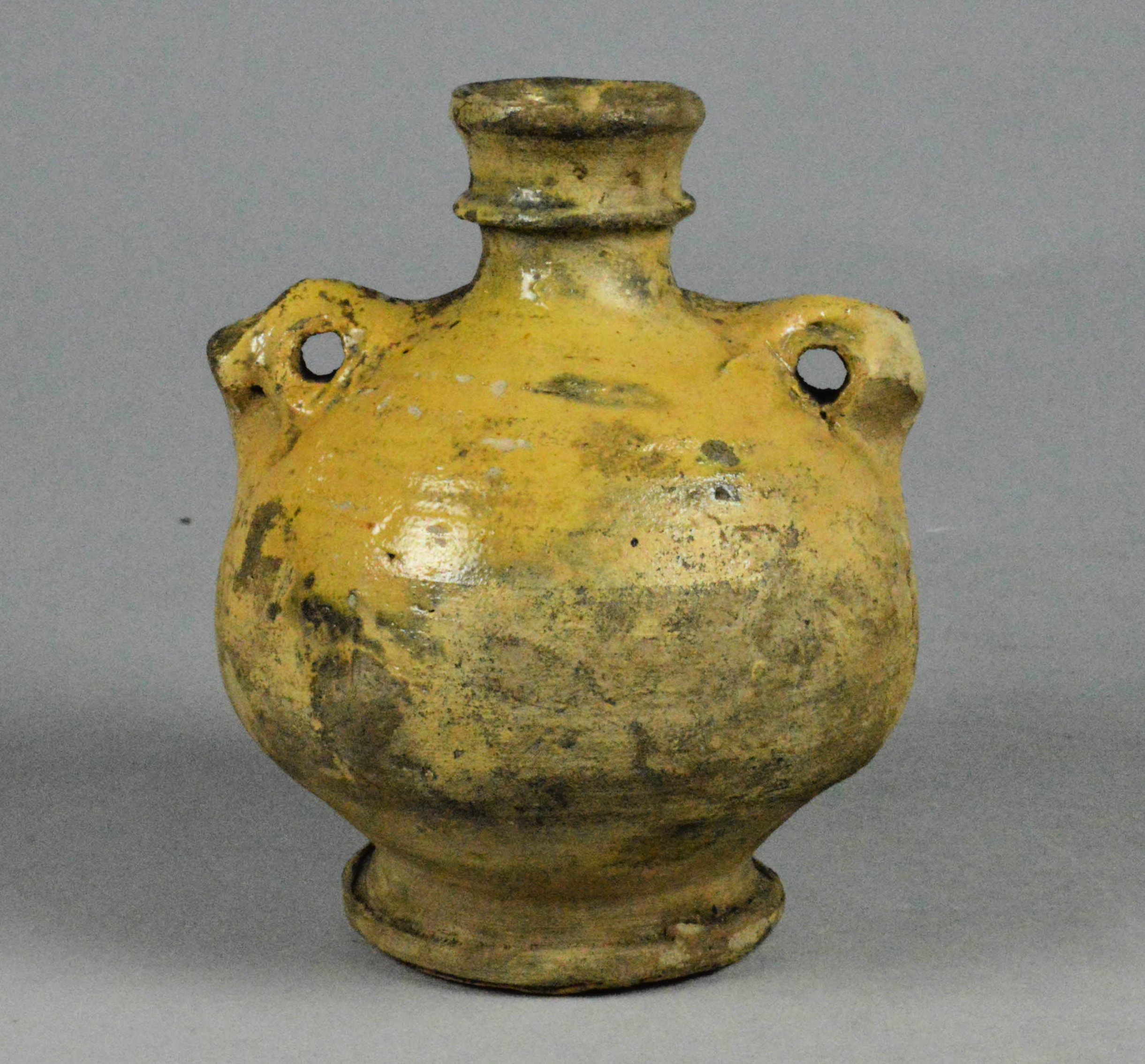
Border ware flask, 16th century

The term, "Border ware" was introduced by archaeologist, Clive Orton, to describe the lead-glazed, sandy earthenware produced along the Surrey-Hampshire borders during the early post-medieval period. The pottery is divided into two classes, whitewares and redwares, although the term "Border ware" generally refers to the whitewares. The redwares are known as "Red Border ware.

=== Fabrics ===
Whiteware fabrics are generally hard with a smooth and fine texture. Fabric colours include off-white, yellow, brown, buff, olive and pinkish grey. Glazes are often crazed and finishes range from thin and spotty to thick and glossy. Glaze colours include yellow, brown, olive clear, and green.

Redware fabrics range from smooth to slightly rough in feel. Fabric colours generally range from brick red to reddish-yellow. Finishes range from thin and uneven to thick and glossy. A clear lead glaze was often used, giving the pottery products an orange or reddish-brown colour. Other glaze colours include olive, brown and green. Green glaze was created by potters by adding copper to lead glaze.

=== Forms ===
Pottery products were traditional household items commonly used during the post-medieval period. Skillets, saucepans, chafing dishes and tripod pipkins were common cookware products manufactured by the Border ware pottery industry.

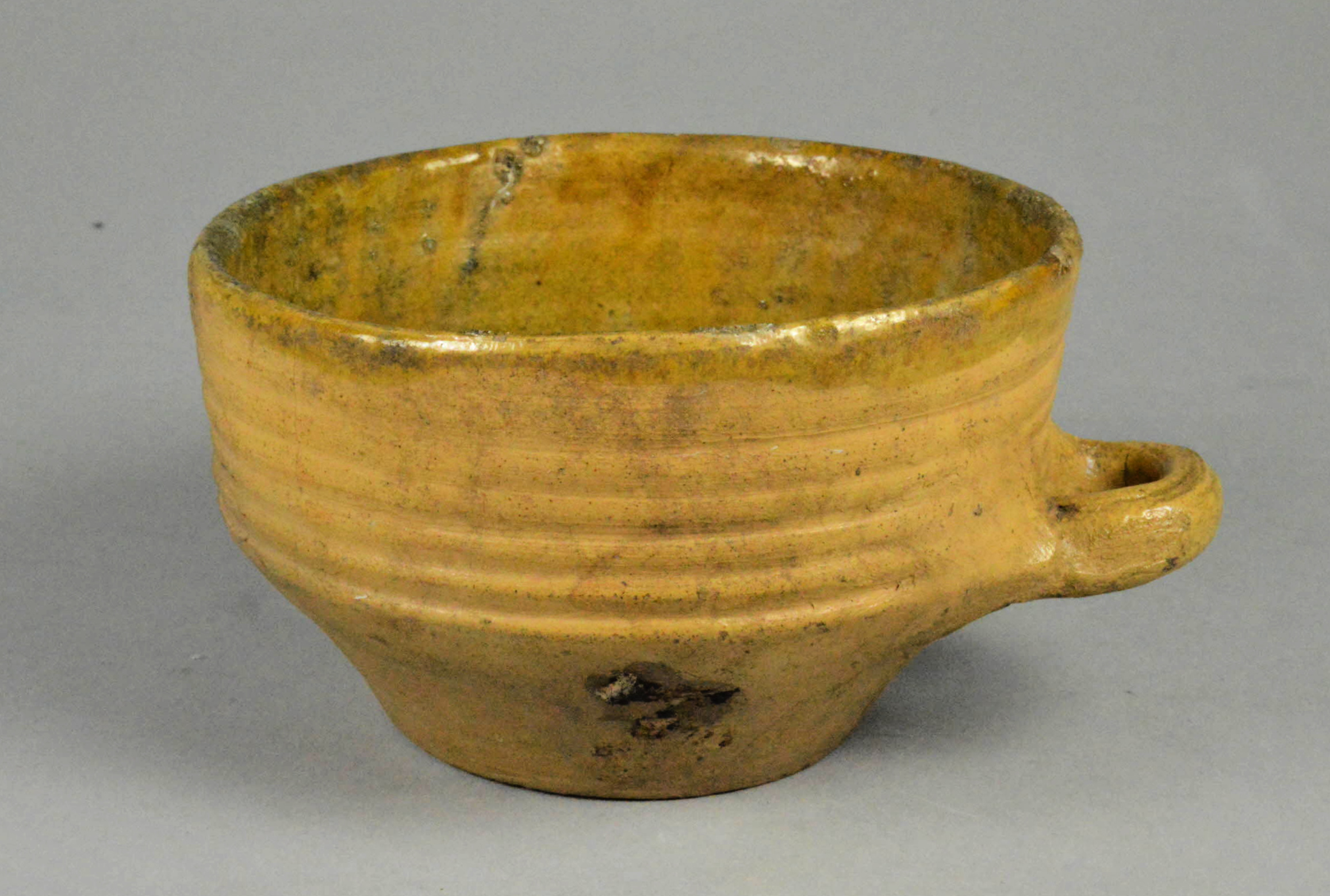
Border ware porringer

Border ware forms used for serving and storing food begin with dishes, which are divided into flanged dishes and deep dishes. Bowls were manufactured in a wide variety of shapes and sizes: wide bowls, deep bowls, bowls with handles, and porringers. Vessels for storing and serving liquids include drinking jugs, cups, goblets and mugs.

Other Border ware forms include costrels (portable flasks), which can be divided into two categories, mammiform costrels and bottle shaped costrels. Candlesticks were two styles: upright and saucer. There were also lanterns, chamber pots, money boxes, jars, double dishes, whistles, fuming pots and strainers.

== Production ==
"The Hampshire-Surrey border potters had a natural advantage through an accident of geology which is not repeated in other areas near London north of the Thames, nor in Kent, and it applied to every kind of vessel they produced."

— F.W. Holling, 1971.

=== Clay sources ===
The source of the white-firing clays used to produce Surrey whitewares was the Reading Beds along the borders of Hampshire and Berkshire. The Reading beds between Farnham and Tongham were the best source of potting clay for medieval potters producing wares for the London market. These outcrops of white-firing and red-firing clay deposits had provided an abundant source of clays for pottery manufacturing since the early Roman period.

=== Pottery sites ===
Border ware manufacturing sites were selected for their proximity to plentiful clay and fuel supplies. The area northeast of Farnham became the centre of the Border ware pottery industry. Three sites have been identified as producing the pottery best representing Border Ware fabrics, forms and glazes. These sites are: Farnborough Hill Convent in Farnborough, Hampshire, Ye Old Malthouse in Hawley, Hampshire and The Lime, Ash, Surrey.

== See also ==
- Stamford ware
- Surrey whiteware
- Humber ware
- Bartmann jug
- List of English medieval pottery

== Gallery ==
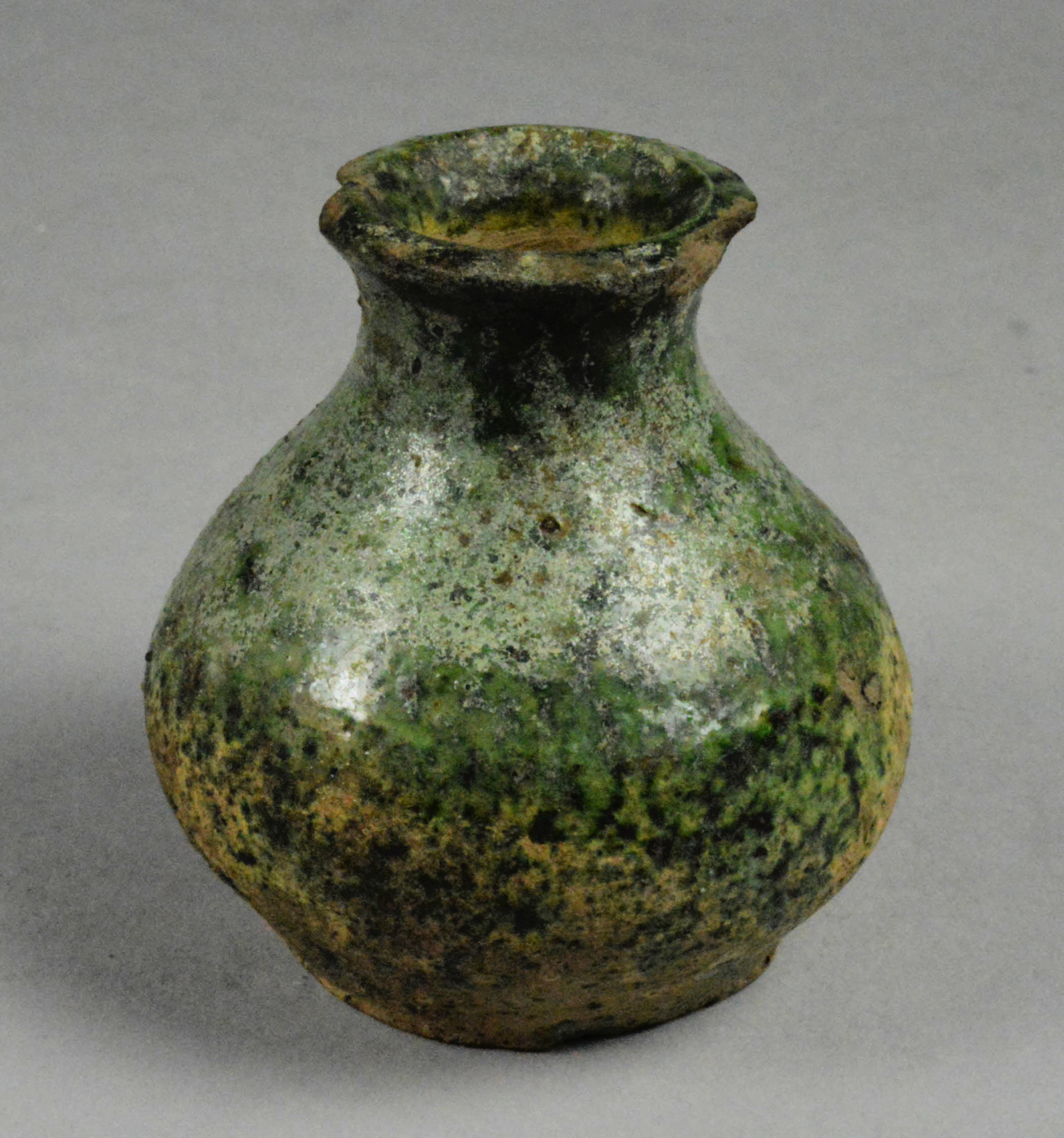
Border ware jar

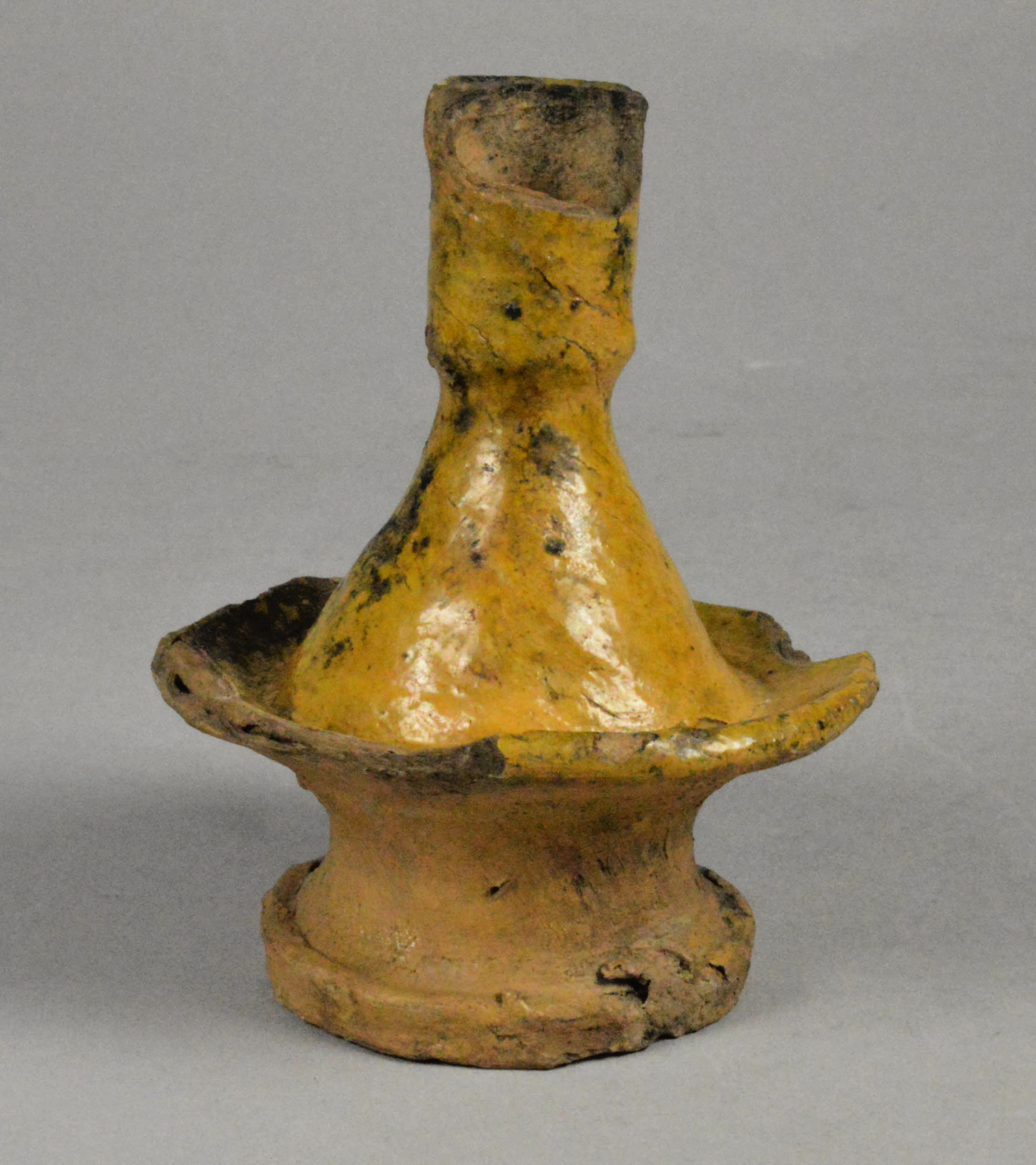
Border ware candlestick

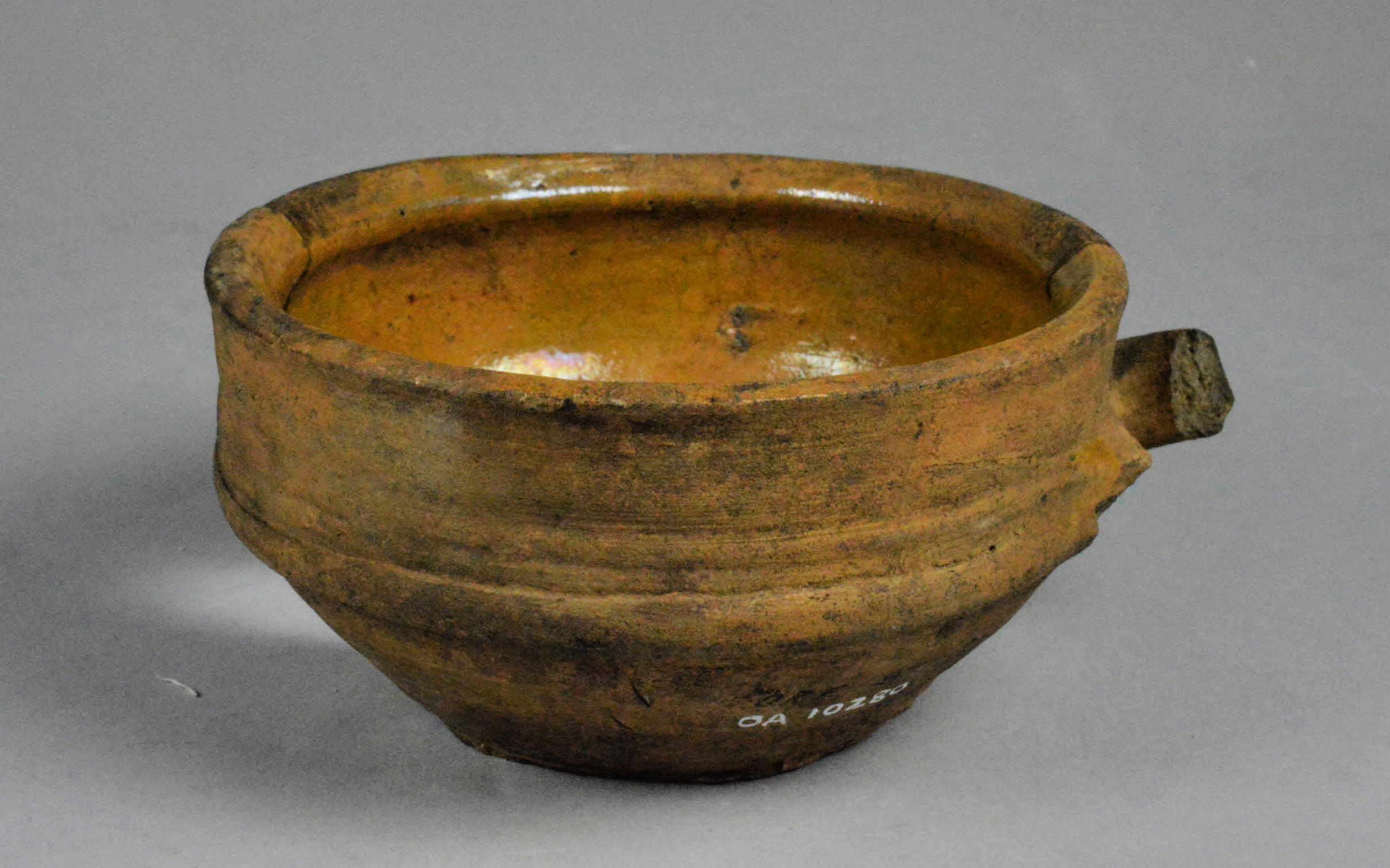
Border ware bowl

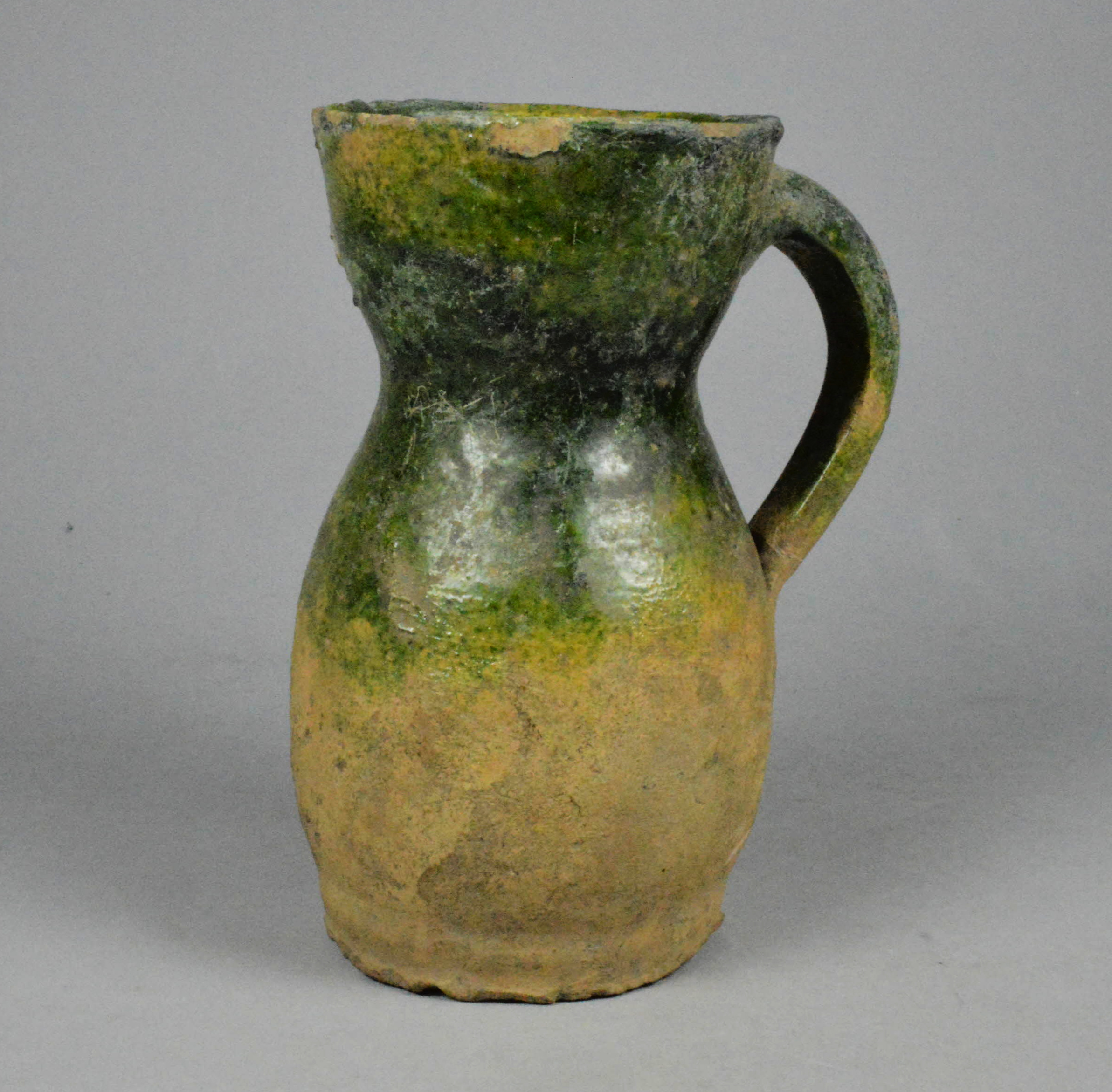
Border ware jug

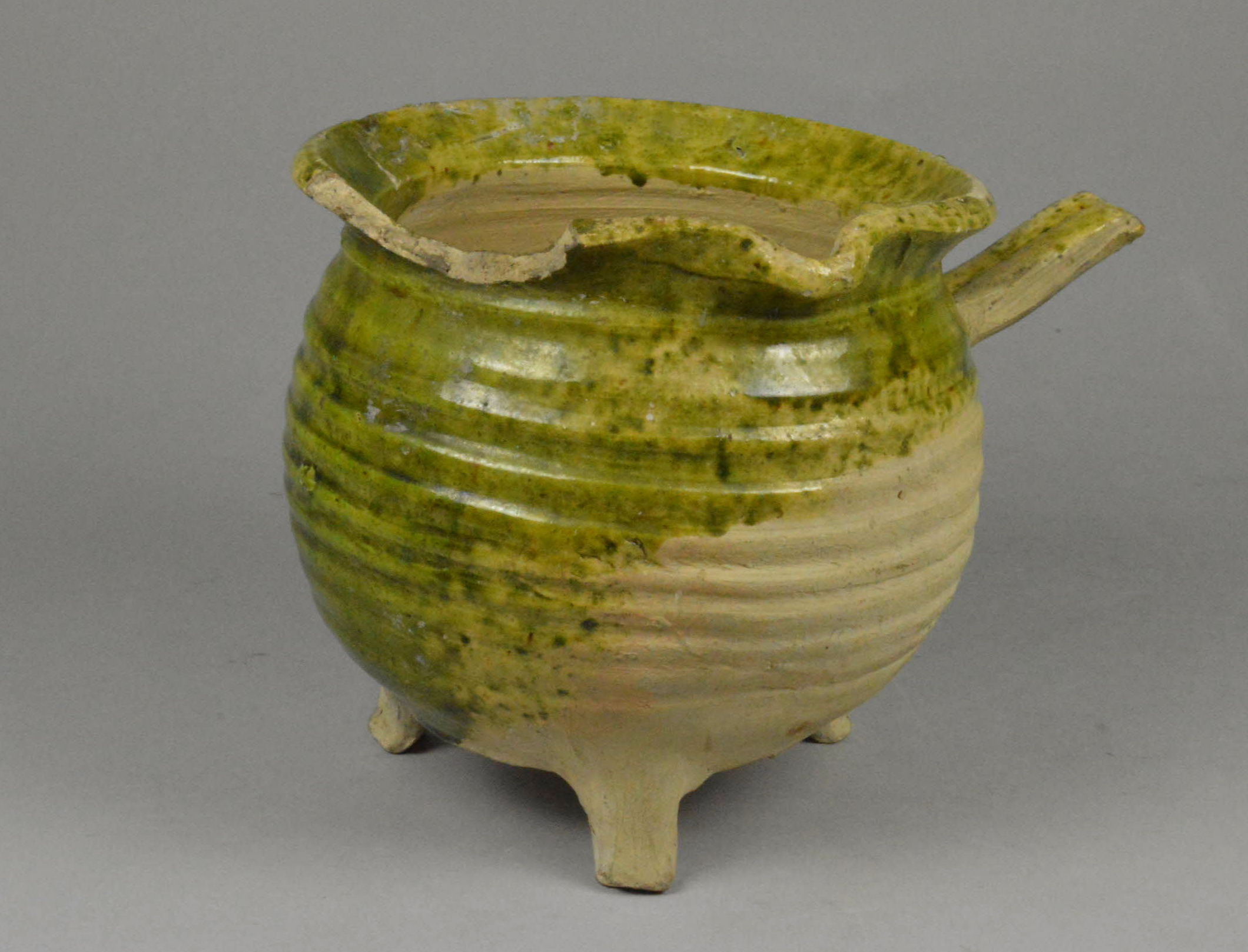
Border ware pipkin

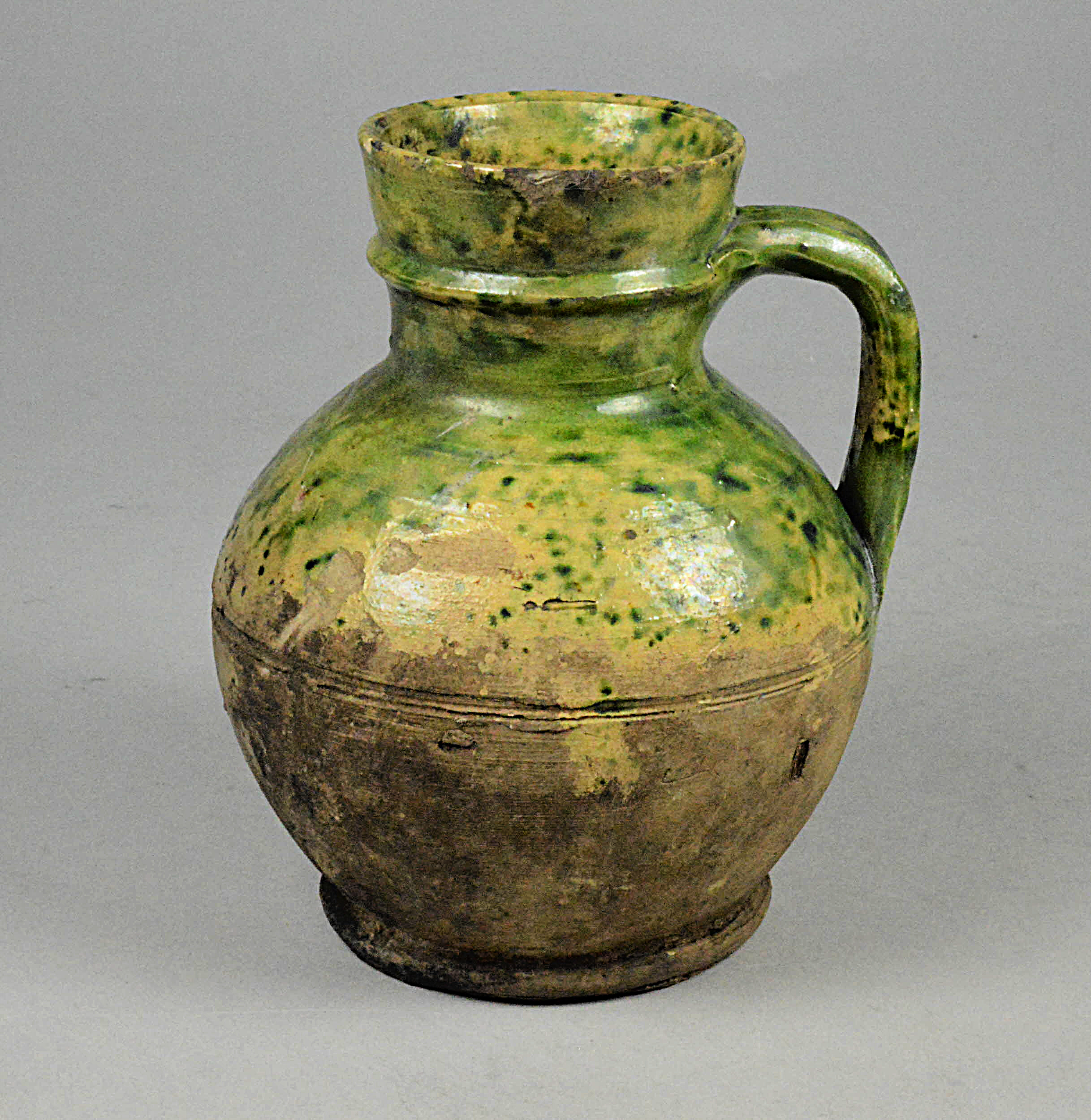
Border ware jug
