= Brandsby-type ware =

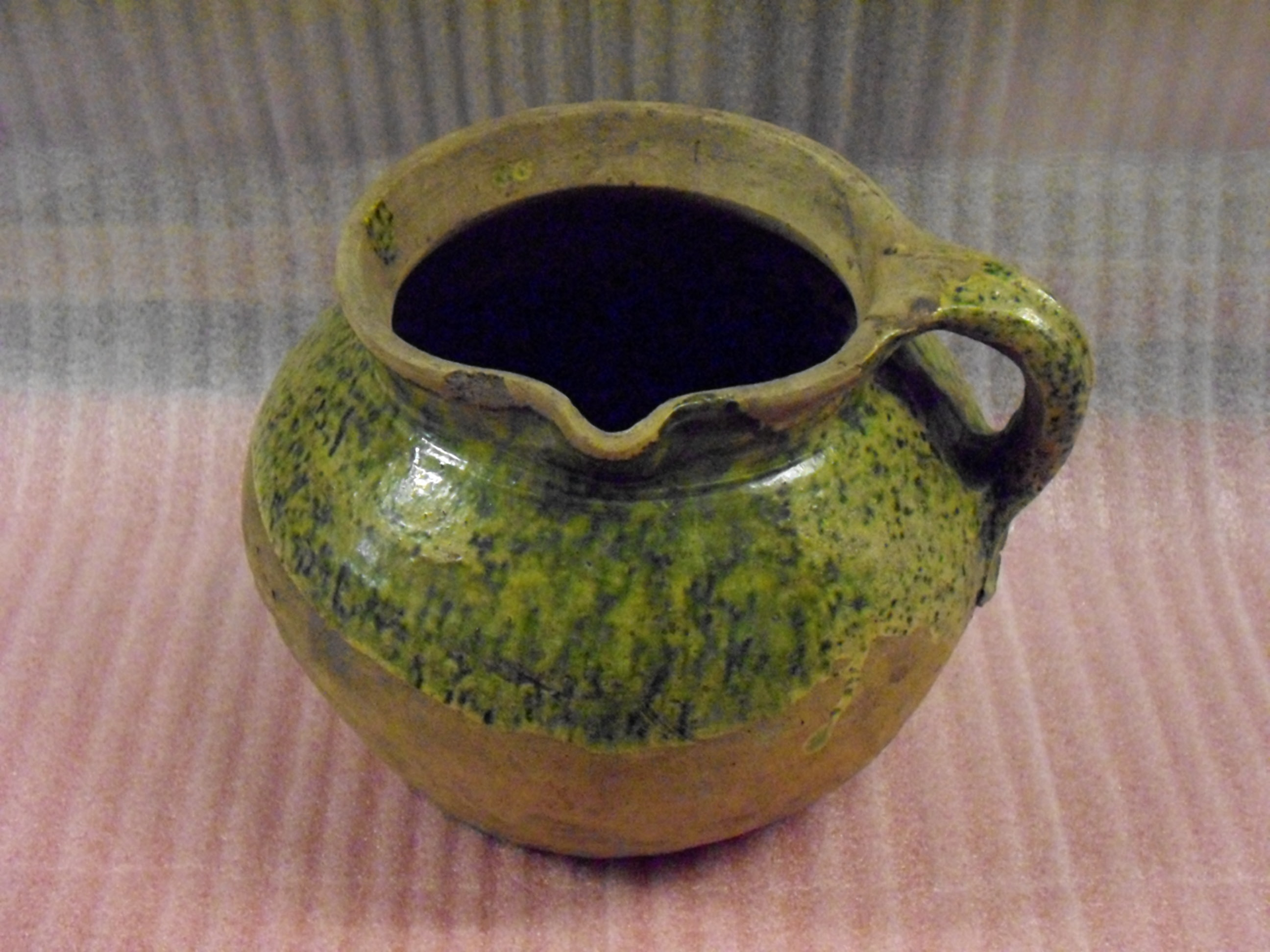
Brandsby-type ware pot in the Yorkshire Museum

Brandsby-type Ware is a type of Medieval ceramic produced in Brandsby, North Yorkshire, England, in the 13th and 14th centuries AD.

== Production zone ==
Brandsby-type ware production is centred on the village of Brandsby, North Yorkshire, 22 km from York but is presumed to have been made in a number of villages to the north of York.

== Fabric ==
Brandsby-type ware is a lightly gritted fabric, generally oxidised to white, pink, pale brown, or reddish-yellow and sometimes with a grey core. They are generally finer and sandier, and usually more hard-fired than the earlier and comparable York Glazed Ware.

== Form and decoration ==
The main form produced from Brandsby-type ware is the jug (or baluster jug), but cooking pots, bowls and condiment dishes also feature. Initially the forms are very similar to York Glazed Ware, but the ware later develops its own unique decorative style including rouletting or roller-stamping, combed wavy lines, or plain incised lines.

== See also ==
- History of Yorkshire
- Medieval York
- York Glazed Ware
- Humber ware
