= Sandy ware =

Historic pottery style of Britain

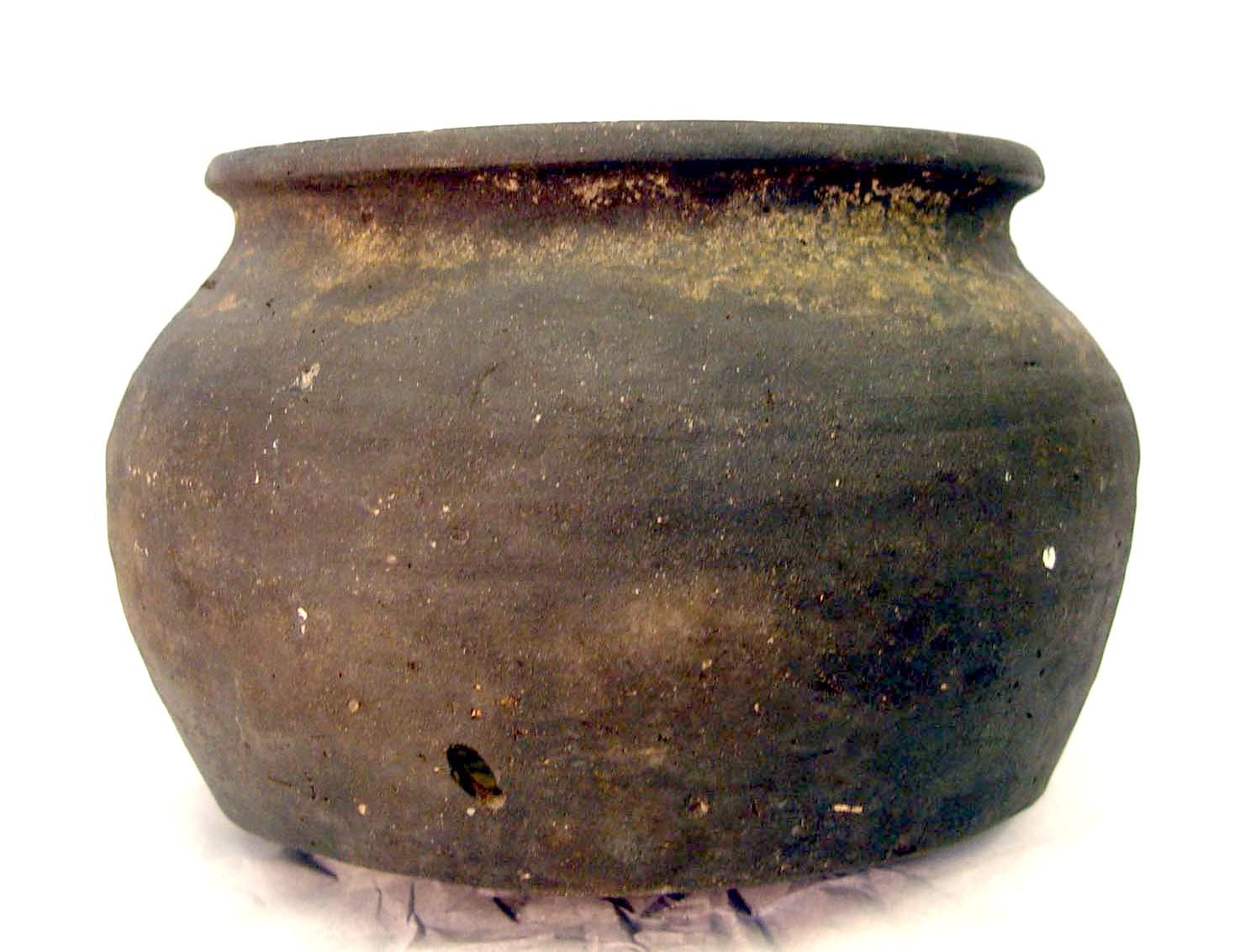
Early Medieval sandy ware cooking pot

Sandy ware, also known as Early Medieval Sandy ware, is a type of pottery found in Great Britain from the sixth through the fourteenth centuries. The pottery fabric is tempered with enough quartz sand mixed in with the clay for it to be visible in the fabric of the pot. Sandy ware was commonly used in Southeast England and the East Midlands.

== Description ==
The identifying feature of Sandy ware is the use of quartz sand as a temper. Sand helped bind the clay together in forming the object, and kept the finished object from cracking while being dried and subsequently fired. The amount of sand used and the size of the sand grains in making Sandy ware differed by region and time period in Britain. The pottery was typically handmade or thrown on a slow wheel and fired on a bonfire, until around the tenth century when potters began transitioning to using a fast wheel.

== History ==
Sandy wares are commonly found in Great Britain from the sixth through the fourteenth centuries. Archaeological excavations during the last fifty years have uncovered important areas of pottery production and use, including Southeast England and the East Midlands.

=== Southeast England ===
==== Kent ====
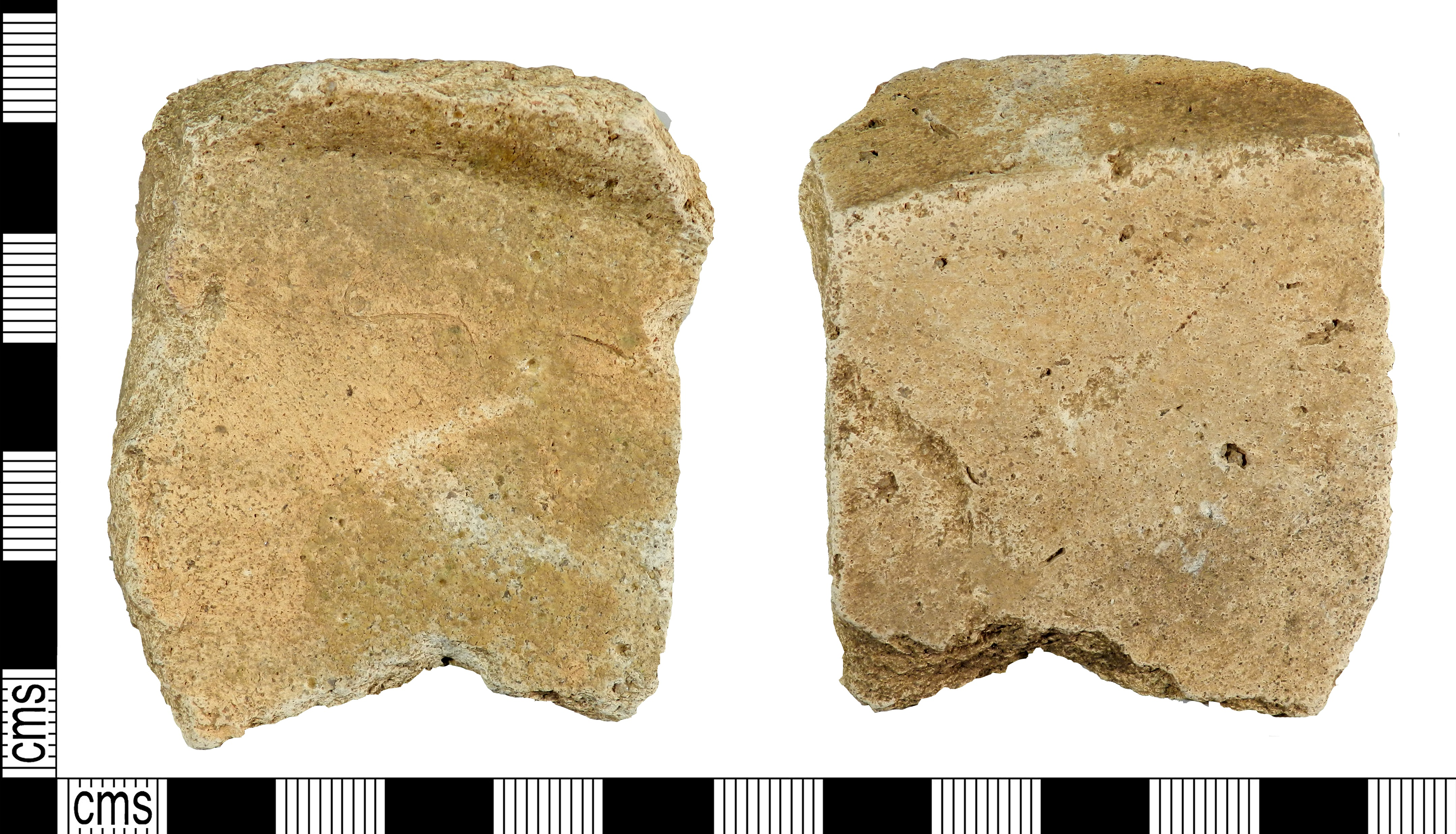
Medieval sandy ware sherds

Archaeological excavations conducted at Lyminge, Kent from 2008 to 2010 uncovered over 6000 pottery sherds. Among the finds were sandy wares from the sixth to the tenth centuries, and the most important finds were from Canterbury. In Canterbury, mid to late Anglo Saxon pottery are predominantly Sandy wares and Shelly wares. The study revealed that the most common pottery type found in Kent during the early to mid Anglo-Saxon era was Sandy Ware, which included three different groups: fine sandy ware, sandy ware, and coarse sandy ware. Five Sandy Ware fabrics were identified during the study.

Jars, cups and bowls were determined to be the predominant vessel types in the excavation at Lyminge. The majority of the pottery fragments uncovered had either no decoration or simple decoration, typically with incised lines. Shelly ware began to replace Sandy ware as the most commonly used pottery type in Kent during the 8th and 9th centuries.

"Fine sandy ware" is defined as pottery with a hard and a slightly rough fabric, brownish-grey in colour with a sandy matrix. "Sandy ware" is divided into two different subtypes, referred to in the study as Fabric 75 and Fabric 76. Fabric 75 dates to the sixth to the seventh centuries. It has a hard fabric, with a rough, dimpled surface. Fabric colour is black or brownish-grey with a brown core. It also has a fine, sandy matrix. Fabric 76 dates from the seventh to the eighth centuries. It is characterized as having a hard, course fabric. The colour is black and dark grey, and it has a sandy matrix.

"Course Sandy ware" has two subtypes, fabric 78 and fabric 87. Fabric 78 has a soft, smooth fabric and is dark grey in colour. It has a sandy matrix with random sedimentary rock fragments. Fabric 87 has a hard, irregular fabric with an orange coloured outer surface and black core. It also has a sandy matrix and has thick-walls.

==== Essex ====
Essex Micaceous Sandy ware, also known as Early Medieval Essex Micaceous Sandy ware, is commonly found in South Cambridgeshire from the eleventh to the twelfth centuries. This type of sandy ware is characterized by the use micaceous clays, which resulted in brown and grey-brown fabrics. Like most early medieval pottery, Essex sandy ware was handmade and wheel thrown. The fabric is coarse and dimpled in texture and tempered with sand grains and mica. Pottery forms include jars, bowls, spouted bowls and curfew bells.

==== London ====
Early Medieval Sandy ware appears in London for the first time in the last quarter of the tenth century. Shelly ware was also commonly used at the time. The pottery fabric was tempered with a large number of quartz sand grains. The sandy ware vessels were all handmade at the time and have thinner walls and are more roughly made than Late Saxon Shelly ware. The pottery forms of Early Medieval Sandy Ware and Early Medieval Sand and Shell ware are similar. Two sandy ware forms that have been found from this time period in London are the cooking-pot and the shallow dish.

== East Midlands ==
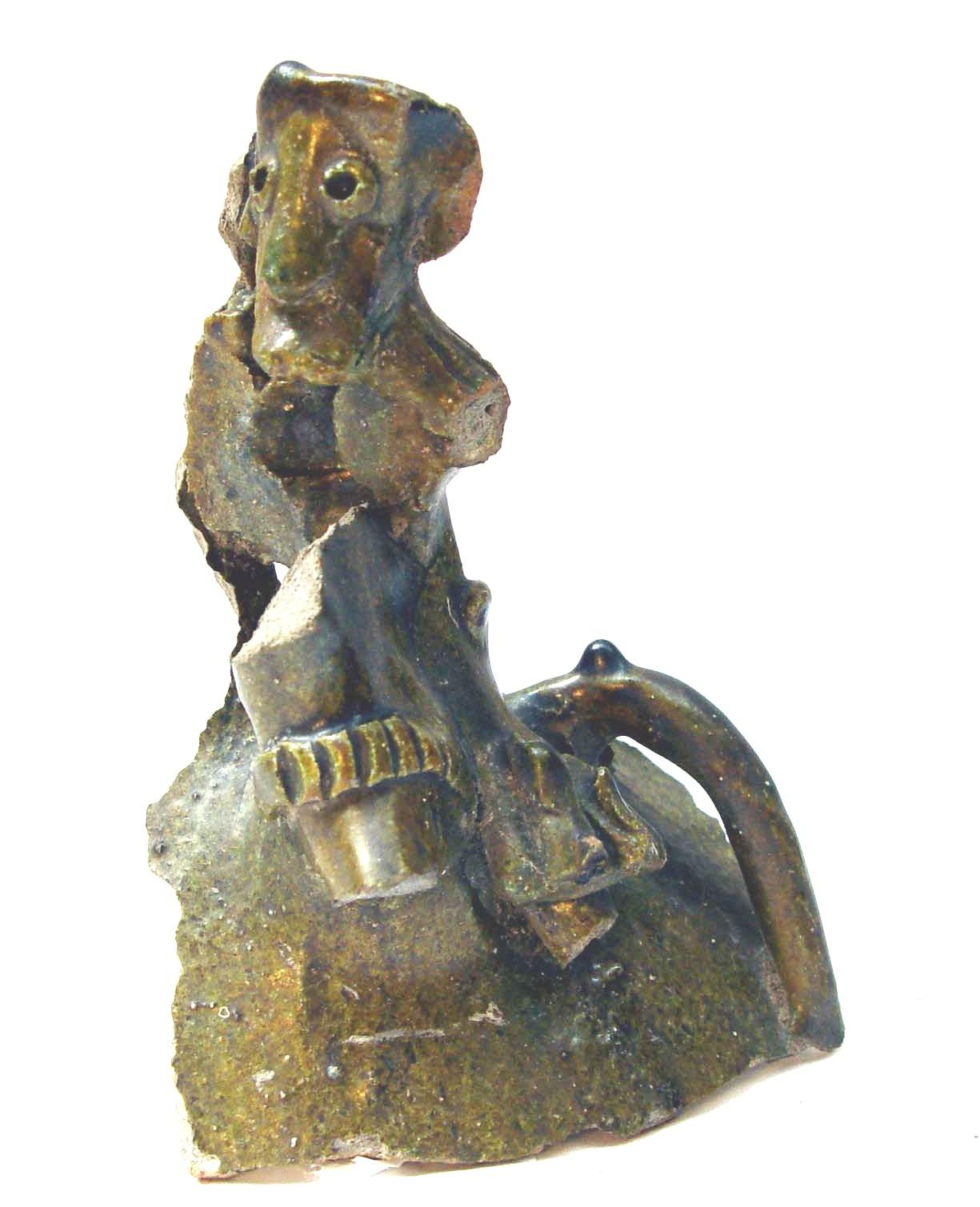
Lincoln sandy ware fragment

Medieval Sandy Ware first appeared in the East Midlands during the middle of the 12th century and was commonly found in the area until the end of the fourteenth century. Of the many pottery sherds found during archaeological excavations, there is very little evidence to determine pottery forms. Of the few sherds that could be identified, the forms were described as bowls, cooking pots, jars, and jugs. The pottery was possibly a mix of local and imported sandy ware types.

There were two types of Early Medieval ware, an earlier type and a later type. The first group dates from the twelfth to the thirteenth century. The characteristics of the pottery are a fabric that is orange to light grey in colour, the light grey colour typically has an oxidized brown surface. The fabric was tempered with numerous quartz sand grains. Clubbed rims were characteristic of this pottery. The later Medieval Sandy ware type has a date range from the thirteenth to the fourteenth centuries. It is characterized by a pinkish-orange colour, sometimes with reduced, grey cores. The fabric is tempered with a large number of quartz sand particles and some iron oxide grains. A pale green glaze was seen on several of the pottery sherds.

== See also ==
- Shelly ware
- Surrey whiteware
- Border ware
- Humber ware
- List of English medieval pottery
