= Humber ware =

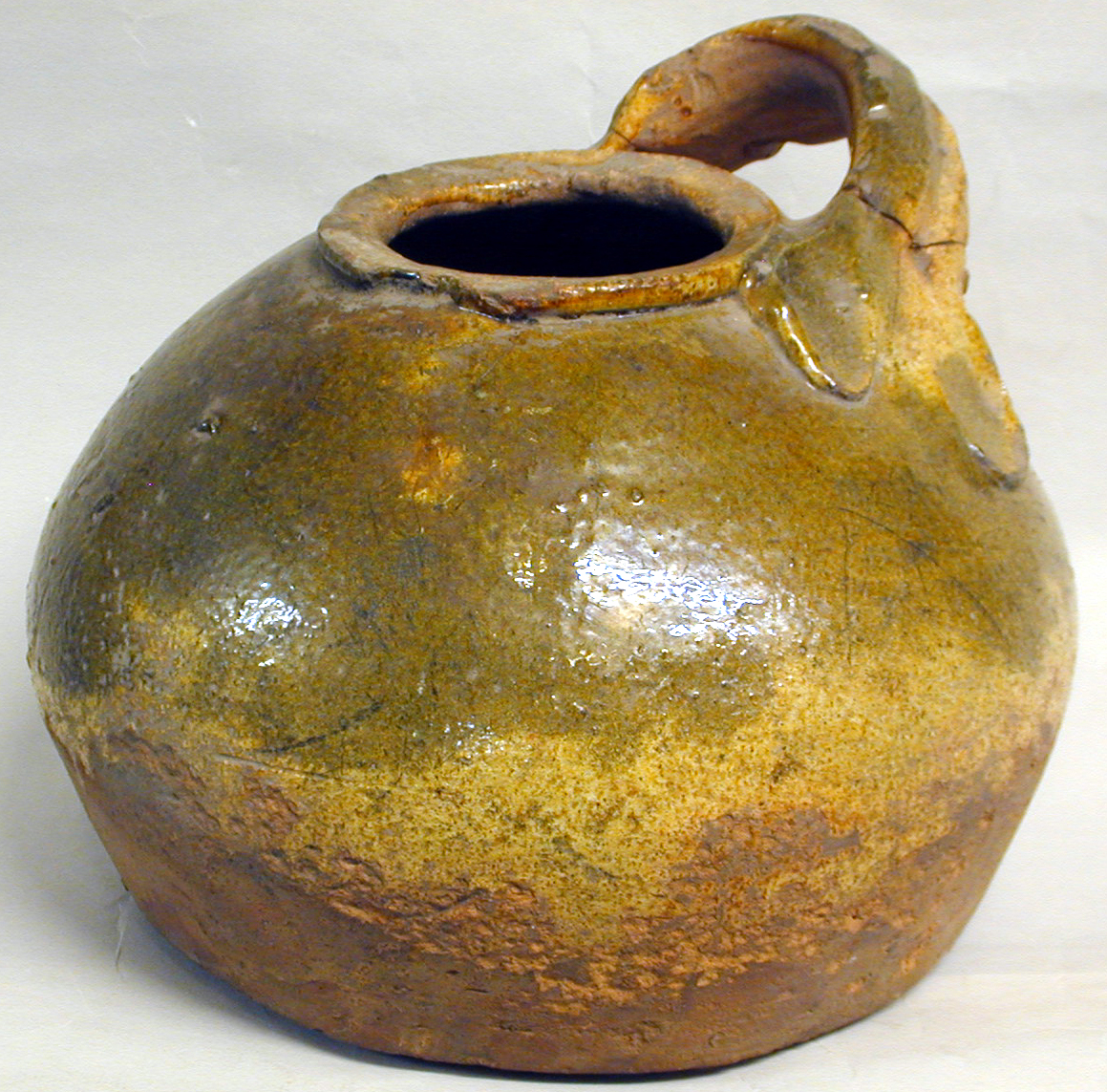
Humber ware urinal. Note the characteristic red colour and olive-green glaze.

Humber ware is a type of Medieval ceramic produced in North Yorkshire, England in the late 13th to early 16th Centuries AD.

== Production zone ==
Two of the best known production sites are at West Cowick and Holme-on-Spalding-Moor, with some additional evidence for one in or near York as well as a kiln at Kelk.

== Fabric ==
Humber wares are hard-fired, iron-rich usually red-bodied wares, although often with reduced cores. They are sparsely tempered with a fine sand, although there are examples of more gritty types.

== Form and decoration ==
Forms include jugs of various sizes, cooking pots and (in the later phases of the industry) urinals and bung-hole cisterns. Several Humber ware sherds have a white encrusted deposit on the interior surface, which has been found to derive from urine. The glaze is usually olive or brownish green, sometimes forming a brown margin at the edges of the glaze. Decoration is usually limited to bands of horizontal grooving on the shoulders or neck, with occasional patterns of wavy combing, rouletting, or stamping. One of the best known products of the Humber kilns are the small drinking jugs, which replaces wooden bowls used in earlier times.

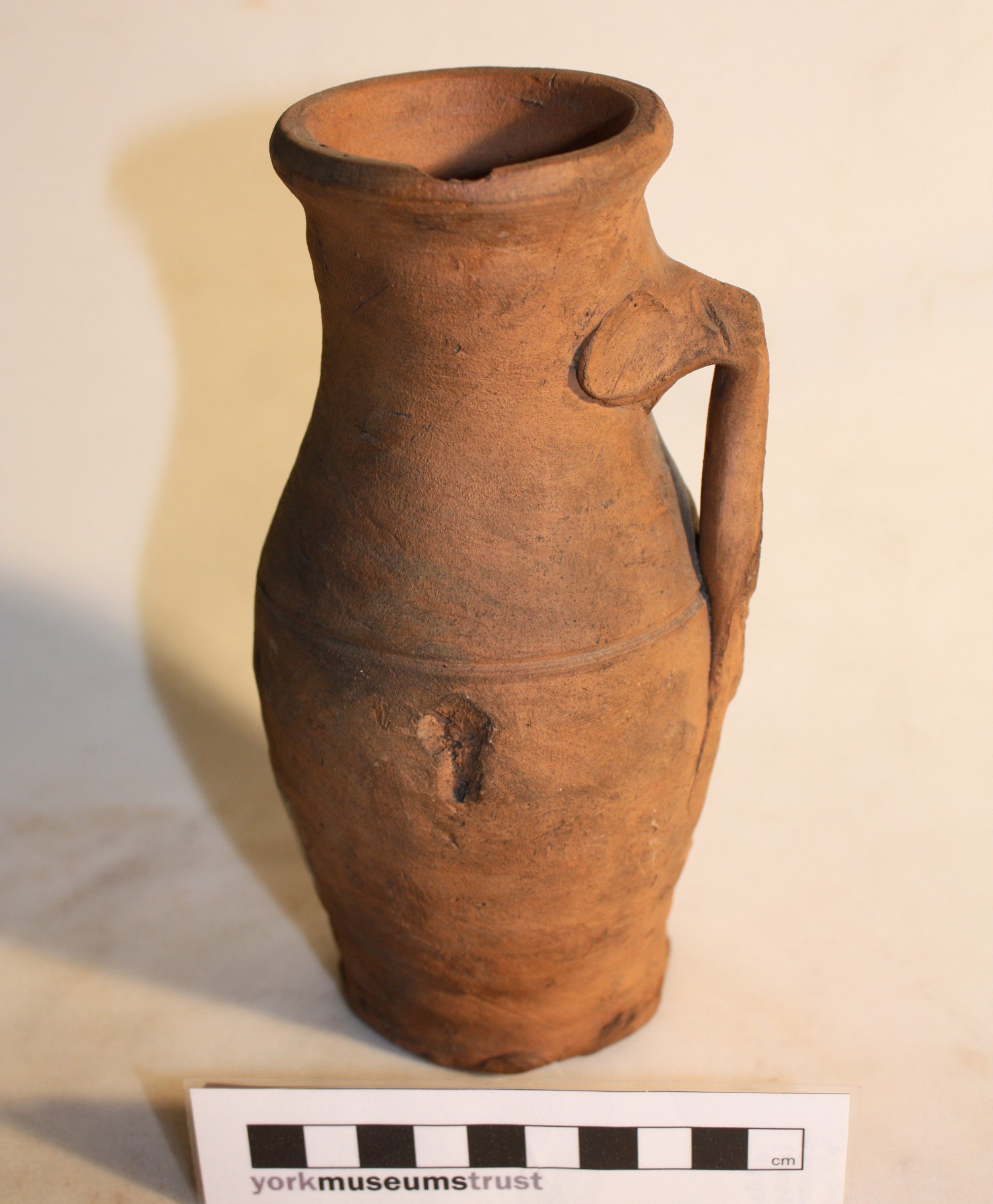
Humber ware jug in the Yorkshire Museum

== Industry ==
The Humber ware tradition lasted for a long time, from the late 13th to the early 16th Century AD, with a peak of production at some point in the 15th Century AD. Its gradual emergence is paralleled by a fall in popularity of the Brandsby-type ware industry. The dating of the end of the industry is not certain; different pottery types such as purple glazed ware and post-medieval red coarse ware seem to develop out of the Humber ware tradition. At the end of the 15th Century AD, the decline in coarse wares for items like cooking vessels may reflect the increased use of metal wares and may be the reason why metal forms were imitated by the potters.

== See also ==
- History of Yorkshire
- Medieval York
- Surrey whiteware
- Border ware
- List of English medieval pottery
