= List of colonists at Roanoke =

Roanoke Colony was an enterprise financed and organized by Sir Walter Raleigh in the late 16th century to establish a permanent English settlement in the Virginia Colony.

== 1585 colony ==
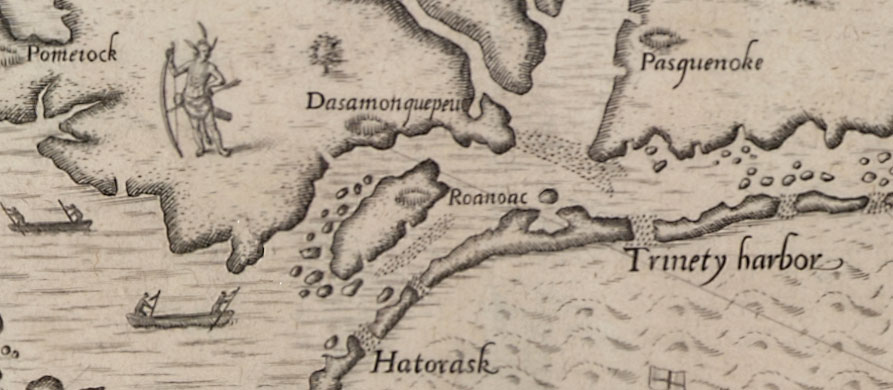
Engraving depicting the coast of North Carolina, including Roanoke Island

The original colony was established in 1585 as a military outpost under the command of Ralph Lane, and evacuated in 1586. A list of colonists is provided in Richard Hakluyt's The Principal Navigations, Voyages, Traffiques, And Discoveries Of The English Nation, although no author is recorded for the list. The list denotes 107 men who served under Lane, for a total of 108 colonists.

A point of contention among historians is that John White is not listed among the 1585 colonists. White is known to have arrived at Roanoke with the colonists, but there is no record of him remaining with the colony through the winter or returning to England with Richard Grenville's fleet. David Beers Quinn argued that White must have remained in the colony long enough to produce a map based on the colonists' 1586 exploration of the region. He speculated that a simple error could have omitted White from the list, or included him as "Iohn Twyt", "William White", or "Iohn Wright". In contrast, James Horn observed that White produced no known artwork of the people and towns discovered after August 1585, suggesting he was no longer present in the colony. As for the map, Horn argued that White, who was not a surveyor, would have based his illustration on someone else's survey data, making it no less plausible that he received such data in England than at Roanoke. In any event, the dispute raises the possibility of errors in the list Hakluyt published, and that the figure of 108 may not be exact.

1. Ralph Lane
2. Philip Amadas
3. Thomas Harriot
4. Acton
5. Edward Stafford
6. Thomas Luddington
7. Maruyn
8. Gardiner
9. Captaine Vaughan
10. Kendall
11. Prideox
12. Robert Holecroft
13. Rise Courtney
14. Hugh Roger
15. Thomas Haruie
16. Snelling
17. Anthony Russe
18. Allyne
19. Michael Polison
20. Iohn Cage
21. Thomas Parre
22. William Randes
23. Geffery Churchman
24. William Farthow
25. Iohn Taylor
26. Philip Robyns
27. Thomas Philips
28. Valentine Beale
29. Thomas Foxe
30. Darby Glande
31. Edward Nugen
32. Edward Kelle
33. Iohn Gostigo
34. Erasmus Clefs
35. Edward Ketcheman
36. Iohn Linsey
37. Thomas Rottenbury
38. Roger Deane
39. Iohn Harris
40. Francis Norris
41. Matthew Lyne
42. Edward Kettell
43. Thomas Wisse
44. Robert Biscombe
45. William Backhouse
46. William White
47. Henry Potkin
48. Dennis Barnes
49. Ioseph Borges
50. Dougham Gannes
51. William Tenche
52. Randall Latham
53. Thomas Hulme
54. Walter Mill
55. Richard Gilbert
56. Steuen Pomarie
57. Iohn Brocke
58. Bennet Harrie
59. Iames Steuenson
60. Charles Steuenson
61. Christopher Lowde
62. Ieremie Man
63. Iames Mason
64. Dauid Salter
65. Richard Ireland
66. Thomas Bookener
67. William Philips
68. Randall Mayne
69. Iames Skinner
70. George Eseuen
71. Iohn Chandeler
72. Philip Blunt
73. Richard Poore
74. Robert Yong
75. Marmaduke Constable
76. Thomas Hesket
77. William Wasse
78. Iohn Feuer
79. Daniel
80. Thomas Taylor
81. Richard Humfrey
82. Iohn Wright
83. Gabriel North
84. Bennet Chappell
85. Richard Sare
86. Iames Lacie
87. Smolkin
88. Thomas Smart
89. Robert
90. Iohn Euans
91. Roger Large
92. Humfrey Garden
93. Francis Whitton
94. Rowland Gryffin
95. William Millard
96. Iohn Twit
97. Edward Seclemore
98. Iohn Anwike
99. Christopher Marshall
100. Dauid Williams
101. Nicholas Swabber
102. Edward Chipping
103. Siluester Beching
104. Vincent Cheyne
105. Hance Walters
106. Edward Barecombe
107. Thomas Skeuelabs
108. William Walters

== 1587 colony ==
Following the evacuation of the 1585 Roanoke colony, Walter Raleigh commissioned a second colony to be established by John White in 1587. The second colony was intended to settle in Chesapeake Bay, but instead was deposited on Roanoke Island. The colonists requested that White return to England, with the expectation that he would come back to Roanoke with fresh supplies in 1588. When White finally returned in 1590, the site of the colony was abandoned.

The exact number of people in the "Lost Colony" is disputed. Hakluyt's Principal Navigations provides a list of 119 individuals who "safely arrived in Virginia" and remained there as of August 1587. The list is not credited, but was presumably compiled by White, given his unique familiarity with the matter. However, White himself is included in the list, as well as Simon Fernandes (who also returned to England) and two men who had died prior to White's departure. The name "Thomas Harris" appears twice, possibly representing two men with the same name or an unintentional duplication. These problems suggest the possibility of other, less obvious issues in the list.

In a 1955 analysis of the list, David Beers Quinn determined "therefore, eighty-five men, less one dead (George Howe) and two returned (John White and Simon Fernandes), seventeen women and eleven children, making 113 brought from England and 110 left by White, plus two children born on Roanoke Island and two Indians, the total left behind being 114." However, Quinn's count of 85 European men may be in error, as he presents all 91 names from Hakluyt but only deducts three. A very conservative tabulation (discounting White, Fernandes, Howe, Thomas Smith and the second Thomas Harris, and assuming Manteo and Towaye did not reside with the colony) would yield a population of 112 following White's departure. In contrast, Andy Gabriel-Powell proposed that the Hakluyt list may be incomplete, and that the total could be as high as 121.

=== Men ===
1. John White (Note: Returned to England in 1587.)
2. Roger Baily
3. Ananias Dare
4. Christopher Cooper
5. Thomas Stevens
6. John Sampson
7. Dyonis Harvie
8. Roger Prat
9. George How (Note: Killed at Roanoke)
10. Simon Fernandes
11. Nicholas Johnson
12. Thomas Warner
13. Anthony Cage
14. John Jones
15. William Willes
16. John Brooke
17. Cutbert White
18. John Bright
19. Clement Tayler
20. William Sole
21. John Cotsmur
22. Humfrey Newton
23. Thomas Colman
24. Thomas Gramme
25. Marke Bennet
26. John Gibbes
27. John Stilman
28. Robert Wilkinson
29. John Tydway
30. Ambrose Viccars
31. Edmond English
32. Thomas Topan
33. Henry Berry
34. Richard Berry
35. John Spendlove
36. John Hemmington
37. Thomas Butler
38. Edward Powell
39. John Burden
40. James Hynde
41. Thomas Ellis
42. William Browne
43. Michael Myllet
44. Thomas Smith (Note: John White reported that a Thomas Smith was killed en route back to England.)
45. Richard Kemme
46. Thomas Harris (Note: Name appears twice, possibly in error)
47. Richard Taverner
48. John Earnest
49. Henry Johnson
50. John Starte
51. Richard Darige
52. William Lucas
53. Arnold Archard
54. John Wright
55. William Dutton
56. Mauris Allen
57. William Waters
58. Richard Arthur
59. John Chapman
60. William Clement
61. Robert Little
62. Hugh Tayler
63. Richard Wildye
64. Lewes Wotton
65. Michael Bishop
66. Henry Browne
67. Henry Rufoote
68. Richard Tomkins
69. Henry Dorrell
70. Charles Florrie
71. Henry Mylton
72. Henry Paine
73. Thomas Harris
74. William Nichols
75. Thomas Phevens
76. John Borden
77. Thomas Scot
78. Peter Little
79. John Wyles
80. Brian Wyles
81. George Martyn
82. Hugh Pattenson
83. Martin Sutton
84. John Farre
85. John Bridger
86. Griffen Jones
87. Richard Shabedge
88. James Lasie
89. John Cheven
90. Thomas Hewet
91. William Berde
92. John Morris

=== Women ===
1. Eleanor Dare
2. Margery Harvie
3. Agnes Wood
4. Wenefrid Powell
5. Joyce Archard
6. Jane Jones
7. Elizabeth Glane
8. Jane Pierce
9. Audry Tappan
10. Alis Chapman
11. Emme Merrimoth
12. Lilith Colman
13. Margaret Lawrence
14. Joan Warren
15. Jane Mannering
16. Rose Payne
17. Elizabeth Viccars

=== Children ===
1. John Sampson
2. Robert Ellis
3. Ambrose Viccars
4. Thomas Archard
5. Thomas Humfrey
6. Thomas Smart
7. George How
8. John Prat
9. William Wythers

Children born at the colony

1. Virginia Dare
2. Harvye

=== Native American repatriates ===
1. Manteo
2. Towaye

== See also ==
- English colonial empire
- List of people who disappeared
