= St Bride's Church =

Church in London, England

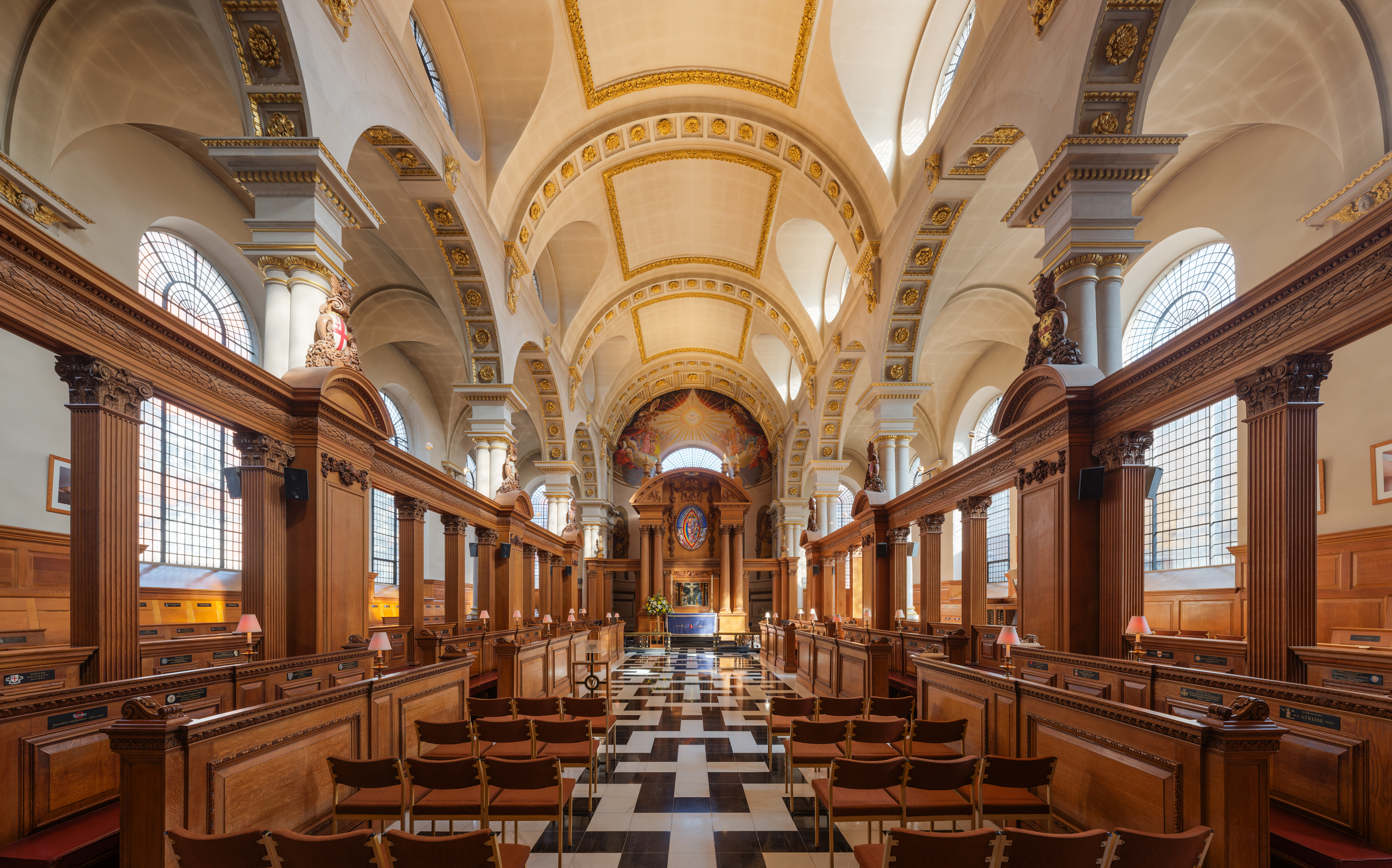
- Interior of the church as viewed from the nave looking east towards the altar

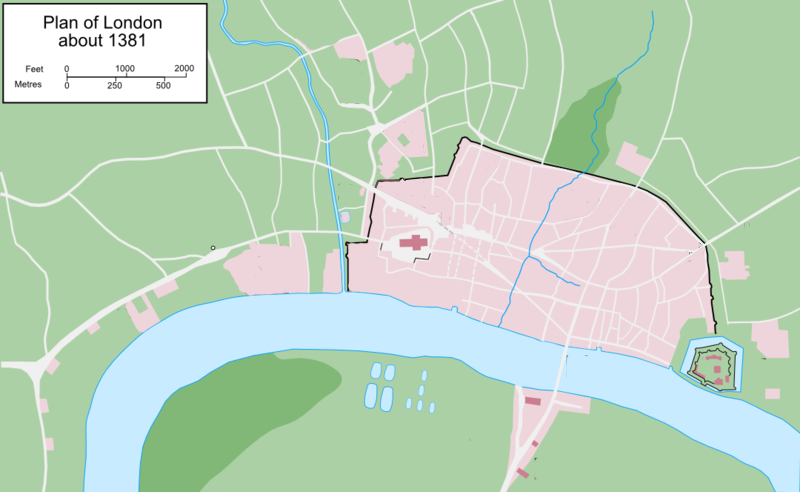
- Location within City of London Location within City of London in 1300
- 51°30′49.6″N 0°6′19.7″W
- OS grid reference: TQ 31556 81128
- Location: Fleet Street, London, EC4Y 8AU
- Country: England
- Language: English
- Denomination: Church of England
- Previous denomination: Roman Catholic (to 1534)
- Website: stbrides.com

History
- Founded: 6th century AD
- Founder: Irish missionaries
- Dedication: Brigid of Kildare

Architecture
- Heritage designation: Grade I listed building
- Architect: Christopher Wren
- Style: English Baroque

Administration
- Diocese: London

Clergy
- Rector: Alison Joyce

St Bride's Church is a Church of England church in Fleet Street in the City of London. Likely dedicated to Saint Bridget perhaps as early as the 6th century, the building's most recent incarnation was designed by Sir Christopher Wren in 1672, though Wren's original building was largely gutted by fire during the London Blitz in 1940 and then reconstructed in a neo-baroque style in the 1950s.

Due to its location in Fleet Street, it has a long association with journalists and newspapers. The church is a distinctive sight on London's skyline and is clearly visible from a number of locations. Since 2012, St Bride's celebrates usually on the first or second Thursday of November, the "Journalists' Commemorative Service".

With its steeple standing 226 feet (69m) tall, it is the second highest of all Wren's church spires, with only St Paul's Cathedral itself having a higher pinnacle.

== Background ==
=== Origins ===
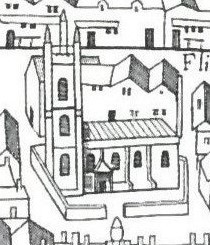
The medieval church from the south, as it appears on the "Copperplate" map of London, surveyed between 1553 and 1559

St Bride's may be one of the most ancient churches in London, with worship perhaps dating back to the conversion of the Middle Saxons in the 7th century. It is believed that its name is derived from Bridget of Ireland, the patron saint of Ireland. It may have been founded by Irish monks, missionaries proselytising the English. It is believed that the original church, founded around the 6th century by Irish missionaries, is the only such Celtic Irish founded church in the east of Britain.

The present St Bride's is at least the seventh church to have stood on the site. Traditionally, it was founded by St Bridget in the sixth century. Whether or not she founded it personally, the remnants of the first church appear to have significant similarities to a church of the same date in Kildare, Ireland. The Norman church, built in the 11th century, was of both religious and secular significance; in 1205, King John held a curia regis there. It was replaced by a larger church in the 15th century.

St Bride's association with the newspaper business began in 1500, when Wynkyn de Worde set up a printing press next door. Until 1695, London was the only city in England where printing was permitted by law.

=== Site archaeology ===
What follows is based on the archaeological investigation begun in 1952 directed by W. F. Grimes - and the 1992-5 reassessment by Museum of London Archaeology Service (MoLAS) reported by Gustav Milne. The 1952 investigation was groundbreaking in many ways and achieved a great deal, but lacked both human and financial resources in the austerity of the post war era. It was done at a time when church archaeology was in its infancy, when excavation and recording techniques were less refined than those of today, before radiocarbon dating had been developed, and isotopic analysis was unknown. There was little on-site security and finds were often stolen or even vandalised. Many of the finds are now stored in the crypt under less than ideal conditions, or went missing before the 1992 reassessment, and were poorly labelled or documented. Apparently some records and field notes are also missing - including a notebook covering eight months' work.

==== Roman ====
The north-west corner of the church was built over an infilled Roman gravel quarry of late first or early second century - common on the periphery of Roman settlements. This was originally thought to be a Roman defensive ditch, and is still often reported as such. There was no evidence of a Roman cemetery at St Bride's. There were fragmentary remains, mainly under the eastern end, of a probably second or third century Roman building with a plain tessellated floor and painted wall plaster. Only a small portion could be excavated and its purpose is unclear. It was abandoned by the late fourth century, demolished, and debris dumped there by the end of the Roman period. Professor Grimes was certain there was "no question of direct continuity between the Saxon church and the Roman building" - a view upheld by later studies.

==== Saxon ====
An L-shaped rubble fragment at the west end of the nave, preserved in the crypt display, deserves mention. It is quite unlike the other medieval remains. It is small. It comprises equal parts Roman tile and ragstone rubble, with some flint, in a bed of sandy gravel with apparently no lime. Could be any time in the Saxon period. The problem is its depth, the top is about one metre below the historic ground level, but it is likely to have subsided into the infilled Roman quarry. It is on the same alignment as the rest of the church, but may have been shaped that way from being cut through by grave digging and the foundations for the west tower. Professor Grimes thought this feature was part of a porch for a western door, however the reassessment by MoLAS cast doubt on this. Its date, and function, remains an open question.

The earliest identifiable church was a single cell masonry structure 7.4m wide. Length given as 18m. Date consensus is late Saxon (after 800) - but no later than 1000-1040. This formed the nucleus around which later additions and rebuilding provide the church known today. In fact the current nave is not a lot wider. There may have been an earlier timber structure, but no evidence for one was found.

Some time after this cell was built it was extended eastward with a square chancel 5.6m by 5.6m, ending in an apse with an internal diameter of 4m. In some fill under the apse foundations was found the handle of a Thetford ware jug that could be dated to 1000-1040. This jug was most likely used (and broken) by workers engaged in the chancel extension, and so may precisely date this phase of building. Hence, also, the terminus ante quem for the earlier single cell. This is how the church should have looked by the Norman Conquest.

It is worth noting that St Bride's in this, its final Saxon form, was quite large. Larger than what is known for many other Saxon parish churches in London. Much larger than St Nicholas Acon, St Nicholas Shambles, St Olave Jewry, or St Pancras - and slightly larger than St Alban Wood Street.

==== Post-conquest ====
===== Twelfth century =====
Archaeologists unexpectedly found the remains of a heavily built, free standing, bell tower halfway along the south wall and measuring some 7m by 7m. Wall thickness at the base was 1.8m (6 feet). There was a gap of 0.45m between the tower and the church. Clearly the builders wanted to avoid structural problems from having such a massive tower in direct contact with the more lightly built Saxon church. Made of rough ragstone rubble - but with expensive, dressed, Caen stone quoins. There is agreement that the tower is twelfth century, although opinions vary as to which part of that century it belongs. This was a very early tower for a parish church in London - only All Hallows Barking and St Mary le Bow are known to have had towers by the twelfth century (though other early towers may yet be discovered). (Note: In 1282 the lead church for ringing curfew was St Martin le Grand, but St Martin's was not a parish church (St Mary le Bow took over that role in 1364).) Other parish churches did not have towers until after about 1370. St Bride's would therefore have been important for the ringing of curfew from this time. The upper parts of this tower were demolished (or collapsed) well before the Great Fire of London, possibly about 1400. The lowest section was retained as its deep foundations gave access to burial crypts. London was affected by an earthquake in 1382 of 6-7 EMS which damaged St Paul's and Westminster Abbey - and is likely the reason the tower of St Bartholomew the Great was rebuilt in 1405. This tower at St Bride's was replaced by one at the west end, where the current tower now stands, between 1409-19.

In the late twelfth century the apse was demolished and the chancel extended another 6.8 metres, this time square ended - with an error giving a slight skew to the east wall. In contrast to the bell tower which used meticulously tooled Caen stone, this chancel rebuild used the cheaper Reigate stone instead. Over the top of the levelled apse, under the 12th century high altar, was the prestigious burial of a middle aged heavily built man in a large stone lined tomb. Mortar samples show this tomb was built at the same time as the extension. Probably the prime benefactor for this rebuilding. Clearly a person of considerable wealth and status. There was a widespread medieval belief that the nearer the burial was to the high altar, the greater the sanctity.

The different materials used suggests the tower and chancel extension were two separate projects. The bell tower's costly construction shows a sharp contrast in allocated resources rather than any difference in date.

St Bride's is likely to have received some damage in a third 'Great Fire of London'. Said to have happened in the first year of the reign of King Stephen (1135/1136), and to have burnt a large area of western London between St Paul's and St Clement Danes. The chancel extension may have been part of some repair work. Within a few decades of this fire the roof of St Bride's was clad in fire resistant ceramic tiles - 'shouldered peg tiles'. First used in London in the mid 12th century. Londoners who could afford it covered their rooves in 'thick tile'. St Bride's has provided historians with the best collection yet of these early tiles. As to the previous roofing material, no trace of earlier tile or of any slate or lead roof. Possibly wooden shingles, but most likely - thatch. A handful of old English churches have retained a thatched roof such as St Margaret's Church, Hales and St Mary's Church, Thornham Parva.

===== Thirteenth century =====
A narrow aisle 3m wide was added to the north side of the nave. This would have meant piercing or partly demolishing the north wall of the original Saxon cell. Narrow church aisles could be built relatively cheaply if the existing nave roof could be merely extended. Likely early thirteenth century. A similar narrow aisle was added to the north side of All Hallows Lombard Street at about this time.

Next a Lady Chapel 4m wide was constructed on the northern side of the chancel for its full length (12.4m). The construction techniques were different from anything else, including subdued chequerwork walls and arched foundations instead of trench built. Accessed from the churchyard by a north door. About the same time a chapel of similar size dedicated to John the Baptist was built on the south side of the chancel. Simpler construction than the Lady Chapel, similar to the earlier chancel extension. Both late thirteenth century. In these chapels access was originally via the churchyard, with no access from within the church itself.

In the next phase a small crypt was excavated beneath the eastern end of the Lady Chapel. This crypt originally had a north door to the churchyard, and a window to the east. The west wall is chalk blocks, the roof is a chalk block vault with Reigate ribs. When new the white chalk would have helped greatly with being able to see in this crypt. The vaulted crypt roof meant raising this part of the chapel floor over a metre creating a raised dias for the altar. Date: although built after the Lady Chapel it may have been completed by the end of the 13th century - else early fourteenth. It's possible this may not originally have been used as a burial crypt, but as an undercroft for storage - even rented out to a local business. All Hallows Honey Lane, All Hallows the Less, St Mary Colechurch, and St Botolph Billingsgate are all known to have had such undercrofts let out to secular tenants. The earliest reference to the Lady Chapel is a record of a burial in 1361 - though whether that was in the crypt, or beneath the floor of the chapel west of the crypt is unclear.

===== Fifteenth century =====
This century was a period of almost complete rebuilding — a new bell tower, this time at the west end — new aisles both north and south - a rebuilt nave - and a third chapel, to St Anne, attached to the southeast corner. This is also a time when written records, such as wills and bequests, are more likely to have survived — allowing more accurate date estimates.

As noted above, the twelfth century southern bell tower is likely to have been damaged by an earthquake in 1382. Traces of the foundations for a replacement tower were found at the west end. It appears today's famous seventeenth century tower was built on the foundations of the fifteenth century one. As well, below ground, Wren's masons apparently reused stone from the 15th century tower showing it to have been made using long blocks of ragstone. Based on this unusual use of ragstone, archaeologist Tim Tatton-Brown placed it as late fourteenth to early fifteenth century. Bequests for this tower: 1409/10, for "bells newly bought" - 1415/16 and 1419, to "the fabric of the bell tower".

A chapel to St Anne was also attached to the south-east corner, alongside the chapel of John the Baptist - for the same length but not as wide. Against the south side of this was built a deep chalk lined pit, apparently a well or cistern. The earliest reference of an altar to St Anne is in 1414.

The narrow north aisle was rebuilt, this time 4m wide, which aligned the north wall with that of the Lady Chapel, though Gustav Milne noted the "poor quality of the stonework". There was a bequest in 1456 for the paving of the north aisle. A similar south aisle was also added, 4m wide, aligning the south wall with the chapel of John the Baptist. The north and south walls of the original Saxon cell were demolished and replaced by pier foundations 1.5m square sunk down through the Saxon foundations - because, as Sir Christopher Wren himself said: "That Foundation which will bear a Wall, will not bear a Pillar, for Pillars thrust themselves into the Earth, & force open the solid Ground". The Lady Chapel's door to the churchyard was blocked, and the west walls of both chapels were partly demolished to provide openings into the church itself, similar to the chancel. There are references to a clerestory, meaning the new nave walls must have been extended in height to allow for that. Two bequests from 1449 for glass for the clerestory windows.

At this stage in the 15th century St Bride's was almost the exact same size as the church which stands today (if you exclude the chapel to St Anne). The main difference is that roughly 40% of the interior space (the eastern two bays) would have been taken up by the chancel and the two chapels. If you stand today in the second or third bays of the nave (counting from the tower) you should be within the original Saxon cell, with the end of the third bay marking the east wall of that early church. Wren's church reused the foundations for the tower and north and south walls, with the wall behind the altar being built over the 12th century chancel extension. Today some of these medieval foundations have been bolstered with brickwork and reinforced concrete in the post war rebuild, mainly the north and south walls. But others, dating to the 12th century, still support today's church.

=== Chapels ===
Chapel worship warrants explanation. Some parishioners would form a guild or fraternity to pay for one or more priests - and anything else the chantry chapel required such as furnishings and candles. The priest would hold services for the souls of deceased guild members - a liturgy such as Office of the Dead. This was seen as an insurance policy against purgatory. At one stage fourteen priests were serving at St Bride's. This was not a Mass for the living and so parishioners would not normally be present. These guilds were dissolved at the English Reformation, not by Henry VIII, but by his son Edward VI in 1547.

A note should be made about any apparently random nature of the chapels at the medieval St Bride's. St Anne was regarded as the mother of the Virgin Mary (Lady Chapel), and the great aunt of John the Baptist, who in turn was regarded as the second cousin of Jesus — hence this drawing by Leonardo depicting all four. As well there was (or is) a commonly held belief that St Brigid was miraculously the midwife at the birth of Jesus. Also, for a church associated with a well - from early times St Mary was associated with sacred waters, as was St Anne, and of course John the Baptist used water for baptism (more on this below: the Well).

=== Dedication to St Bride ===
It has been suggested that a well on the site may originally have been sacred to the Romano-Celtic Brigantia and only transferred to the Irish Brigid sometime in the Anglo-Saxon period.

The notable historian Christopher Brooke proposed that the odd dedication may be the result of Viking settlement rather than Irish missionaries. Other historians concur. He points out that even in Ireland there is no evidence of churches dedicated to St Bridget before the eighth and ninth centuries. However, he concedes that when faint traces of an early church were found on site the temptation to link a possibly 6th century church with a 6th century saint would have been very great. A dedication linked to Vikings would bring that event forward to the 10th or 11th centuries. There were Viking colonies in Ireland — especially Dublin. From those bases they fanned out to the west coast of Britain - the Wirral Peninsula in particular — but also Cumbria and the Isle of Man. The newly (or partially) Christianised Vikings seem to have taken a shine to Brigid in particular - with churches to St. Bride in areas of Norse settlement.

There is St Bridget's Church in West Kirby on the Wirral Peninsula. The name Kirby is from Kirkjubyr — cognate with Kirkjubøur, a village in the Faroes. There is a St Bridget's Church on the Isle of Man at Bride (sometimes called Kirk Bride) - seen here on the Manx Wikipedia. Cumbria has both a Bridekirk and a Kirkbride. In St. Bridget's Church in Bridekirk, the old font has a runic inscription. Bride's Kirk on North Ronaldsay in the Orkneys is at another Norwegian Viking power-base. 'Kirk' as used in Scotland is actually a Norse loanword. As Clare Downham puts it: "This seems an ironic image - Vikings who were famous for sacking churches later became patrons for Irish saints abroad, but the evidence is compelling." Whatever the reason for the naming of St Clement Danes further down the road — it is just one indicator of Norse (or Hiberno-Norse) activity in this area near London. St Clement was another Norse favourite.

Professor Brooke believed the heyday of Norse settlement in London was the early 11th century (with King Canute) - or possibly even the late 10th - and that it was the space west of the City over which settlement was spreading fastest. To seafarers focused on trade London would have been an irresistible magnet. The now largely depopulated Lundenwic, centred on The Strand right beside the Thames, would have been an ideal location (whilst allowing an exit strategy). He even said that the Norse community would have been the main benefactors of an eleventh-century St Bride's. However, it is likely that the Norse settlers (as noted above) may only have been partially, or superficially, Christianised. See this early to mid 11th century Viking grave marker discovered in St Paul's churchyard - pagan symbolism, yet buried in a churchyard.

=== Well ===
A holy well, or series of wells, has long been associated with the site. Hence 'Bridewell' as the name for the palace (later a prison) just to the south. Gustav Milne felt this well was underappreciated — and that it was the reason for this church being built. As mentioned above, it has been suggested this well may originally have been sacred to the Romano-Celtic Brigantia. However Ronald Hutton would argue this is highly unlikely for an English well. He points out that of some nine hundred known holy wells in the Middle Ages, only about a dozen could be regarded as sacred in pre-Christian times — with only one (at Low Leyton) showing any evidence of pagan activity. Even in these cases the association may have been coincidental rather than any continuity of veneration - and that the only thing ancient is the natural tendency of people to believe that the water of a particular well was 'special', or better than others (note: this applies to English holy wells — it may not be the case for wells in Wales, Cornwall, Brittany - and especially Ireland).

During the post war archaeological dig a deep pit was found just east of the first known masonry church. This was taken as a possible well by some archaeologists as chapels were often built west of a holy well. Though it yielded none of the votive offerings expected from a sacred spring.

The dig discovered a second well or cistern — a rectangular chalk lined pit dug to a depth of over 5 metres below ground level just south of the late 13th century chapel of John the Baptist. This was taken to be a well as it was dug down into the water bearing gravels. Over this had been built the early 15th century chapel to St Anne. There is the connection of John the Baptist to water (baptism), with St Anne (or Anna) being a patron saint of springs and wells — and associated with healing waters. Taken together this strongly suggests St Bride's was the focus of a (possibly pre-Christian) water cult that continued until the reformation. This also reproduced, in miniature, an arrangement in Jerusalem. The 12th century Crusader Church of St Anne was built right beside the Pools of Bethesda — with earlier churches having been built over parts of these pools. The waters of which were commonly regarded as having miraculous healing properties.

There was certainly a third (possibly the original) well at the south east corner of the churchyard. An engraving of 1817 clearly shows that well's pump set in an arched recess under the southern end of the eastern churchyard wall — accessed via Bride Lane. Workmen digging nearby in 1893 discovered "an ancient water conduit" of adzed wood that had supplied water from this pump or spring to Bridewell Palace and noted an inscription above the pump had been "completely effaced by time". The Vestry minutes for 1850 record that contractors excavating for a new sewer in Bride Lane finally cut off or diverted the source which fed the well. Sadly - it seems the site of this well is inside what is now the Rector's garage.

=== Roanoke colony ===
In the late 1580s, Eleanor White, daughter to artist and explorer John White, was married in St Bride's to the tiler and bricklayer Ananias Dare. Their daughter, Virginia Dare, was to be the first English child born in North America. She was born on Roanoke Island on 18 August 1587: "Elenora, daughter to the governour and wife to Ananias Dare, one of the assistants, was delivered of a daughter in Roanoke". The child was healthy and "was christened there the Sunday following, and because this childe was the first Christian borne in Virginia, she was named Virginia". A modern bust of Virginia Dare stands near the font (one of the few survivals from the original church), replacing an earlier monument which was stolen and has not been recovered.

=== Great Fire of London ===
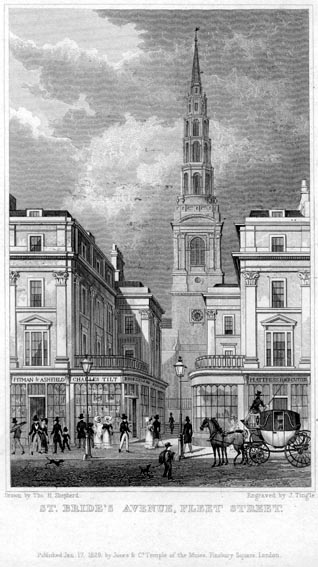
St Bride's Church, 19th-century engraving

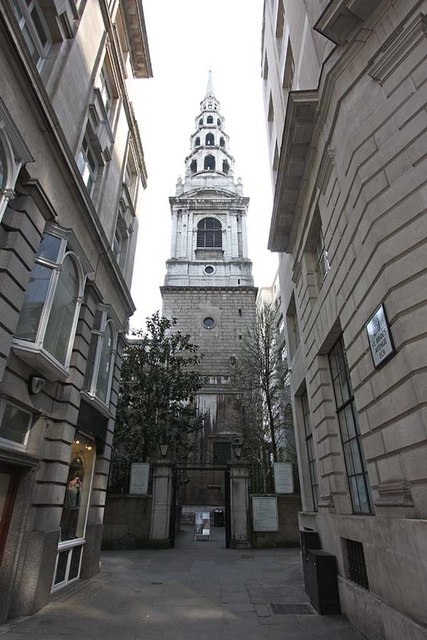
St Bride's Church, Fleet Street

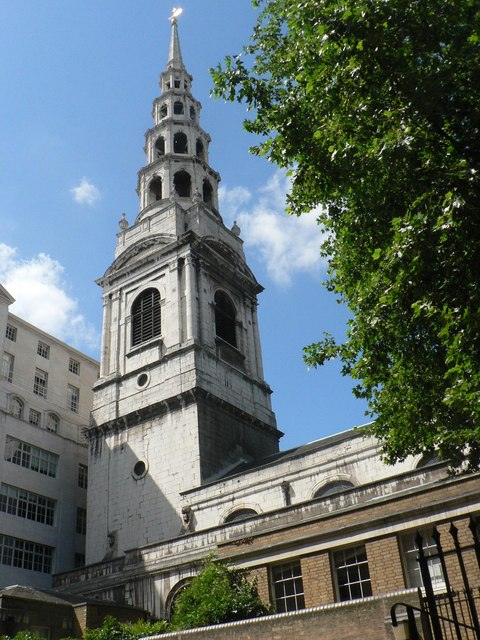
St Bride's Church, 2008

In the mid-17th century disaster struck. In 1665, the Great Plague of London killed 238 parishioners in a single week, and in 1666, the following year, the church was completely destroyed during the Great Fire of London, which burned much of the city. After the fire, the old church was replaced by an entirely new building designed by Sir Christopher Wren, one of his largest and most expensive works, taking seven years to build.

St Bride's was reopened on 19 December 1675. The famous spire was added later, in 1701–1703. It measures 234 ft, but the top eight feet were replaced after a lightning strike in 1764; the damaged stone was purchased by the owner of Park Place, Berkshire, where it remains. The design utilises four octagonal stages of diminishing height, capped with an obelisk which terminates in a ball and vane.

Buried at St Bride's is Robert Levet (Levett), a Yorkshireman who became a Parisian waiter, then a "practicer of physick" who ministered to the denizens of London's seedier neighbourhoods. Having been duped into a bad marriage, the hapless Levet was taken in by the author Samuel Johnson who wrote his poem "On the Death of Mr. Robert Levet", eulogising his good friend and tenant of many years. Also buried at St Bride's are the composer Sir William Leighton (d. 1622), organist and composer Thomas Weelkes (d. 1623) and the poet Richard Lovelace (d. 1658), as well as author Samuel Richardson (d. 1761)

The belfry and spire of the tower is loosely based on that of a Roman lighthouse, with tiers of diminishing scale to exaggerate its height. Its design is attributed to Nicholas Hawksmoor in The Office of Kings Works, of which Wren was the Chief Surveyor; though the drawings are not signed, as was then common, they are in Hawksmoor's hand.

Traditional wedding cakes are said to date back to 1703 when Thomas Rich, a baker's apprentice from Ludgate Hill wanted to make an extravagant cake, and drew on the design of St Bride's Church for inspiration.

=== Second World War ===
On the night of 29 December 1940, during the Blitz of central London in the Second World War, the church was gutted by fire-bombs dropped by the Luftwaffe. That night 1,500 fires were started, including three major conflagrations, leading to a fire storm, an event dubbed the Second Great Fire of London, due to the enormous amount of damage caused. St Paul's Cathedral itself was only saved by the dedication of the London firemen who kept the fire away from the cathedral, and by the volunteer firewatchers of the St Paul's Watch who fought to keep the flames from firebombs on the roof from spreading. After the war, St Bride's was rebuilt at the expense of newspaper proprietors and journalists in a neo-baroque style, with collegiate layout seating in place of the previous parish church arrangement facing the altar.

One fortunate and unintended consequence of the bombing was the excavation of the church's original 6th-century Saxon foundations. Today, the crypt known as the Museum of Fleet Street is open to the public and contains a number of ancient relics, including Roman coins and medieval stained glass. Post-war excavations also uncovered nearly 230 lead coffins with plaques dating from the 17th, 18th and early 19th centuries, filled with the bones of parishioners; causes of death for most of them were found by the Museum of London.

== Modern era ==
The church was designated a Grade I listed building on 4 January 1950.

In September 2007 the former rector, Archdeacon the Venerable David Meara, announced a special appeal to raise £3.5 million to preserve the church's unique heritage and in November 2007 Queen Elizabeth II was guest of honour at a service to celebrate the fiftieth anniversary of the restoration work necessary after the Second World War.

In March 2012, the Inspire! appeal was launched to raise the at least £2.5m needed to repair the crumbling stonework of the church's famous spire.

In March 2016 the wedding of Jerry Hall and Rupert Murdoch was celebrated at St Bride's.

== Music ==
=== Choir ===
The choir in its present form (12 adult singers – 4 sopranos, 2 altos, 3 tenors and 3 basses) was established in time for the re-dedication service in 1957, and has remained more or less in this format ever since. The choir sings at two services each Sunday throughout the year (reducing to 8 singers during August) and also for numerous special services.

=== Organ ===
The organ was built by the John Compton Organ Company, and is arguably their finest work. It was ready for the rededication of the church in November 1957. It has recently been completely overhauled and cleaned by Keith Bance, who has carried out some modest tonal updating. This included remodelling the positive division, adding new mixture stops to the great and pedal divisions and the provision of a new Vox Humana for the solo division. These changes have further increased the resources of an already versatile instrument. The organ has four manuals, 98 speaking stops, close to 4,000 pipes, a multi-level capture system and the wind is provided by four blowing installations.

==== Organists ====
- Henry Lightindollar 1696–1702
- John Weldon 1702–1736
- Samuel Howard 1736–1782
- Richard Huddleston Potter 1782–1821
- George Mather 1821–1854
- Mr. Reynolds, from 1854
- Ernest Kiver, from 1882
- John D. Codner, until 1888 (later organist of St Davids Cathedral)
- Edmund Hart Turpin 1888–1907
- Herbert Townsend 1909–ca. 1921
- Gordon Reynolds 1952–1965
- Robert Langston 1972–1988
- Robert Harre-Jones, from 1988

=== Bells ===
St Bride's Church is noted as the site of the first ever full peal on twelve bells (5060 Grandsire Cinques), and is considered to be one of the first towers which had a diatonic ring of twelve bells. Ten bells were cast for the church in 1710 by Abraham Rudhall of Gloucester, and were augmented to twelve in 1719 with the addition of two trebles. The 5th and 6th bells were recast by Samuel Knight of Holborn in 1736.

All of the bells were destroyed on 29 December 1940 during the Blitz. After the war, a single bell cast by John Taylor & Co was placed in the tower, hung for full-circle ringing, but was never joined by any other bells. During the installation, the church and foundry made sure that it was sympathetic to a future 12-bell installation. It weighs 15 hundredweight in the key of F♯, and would be the 10th of a new ring of 12 in D.

== Notable parishioners ==
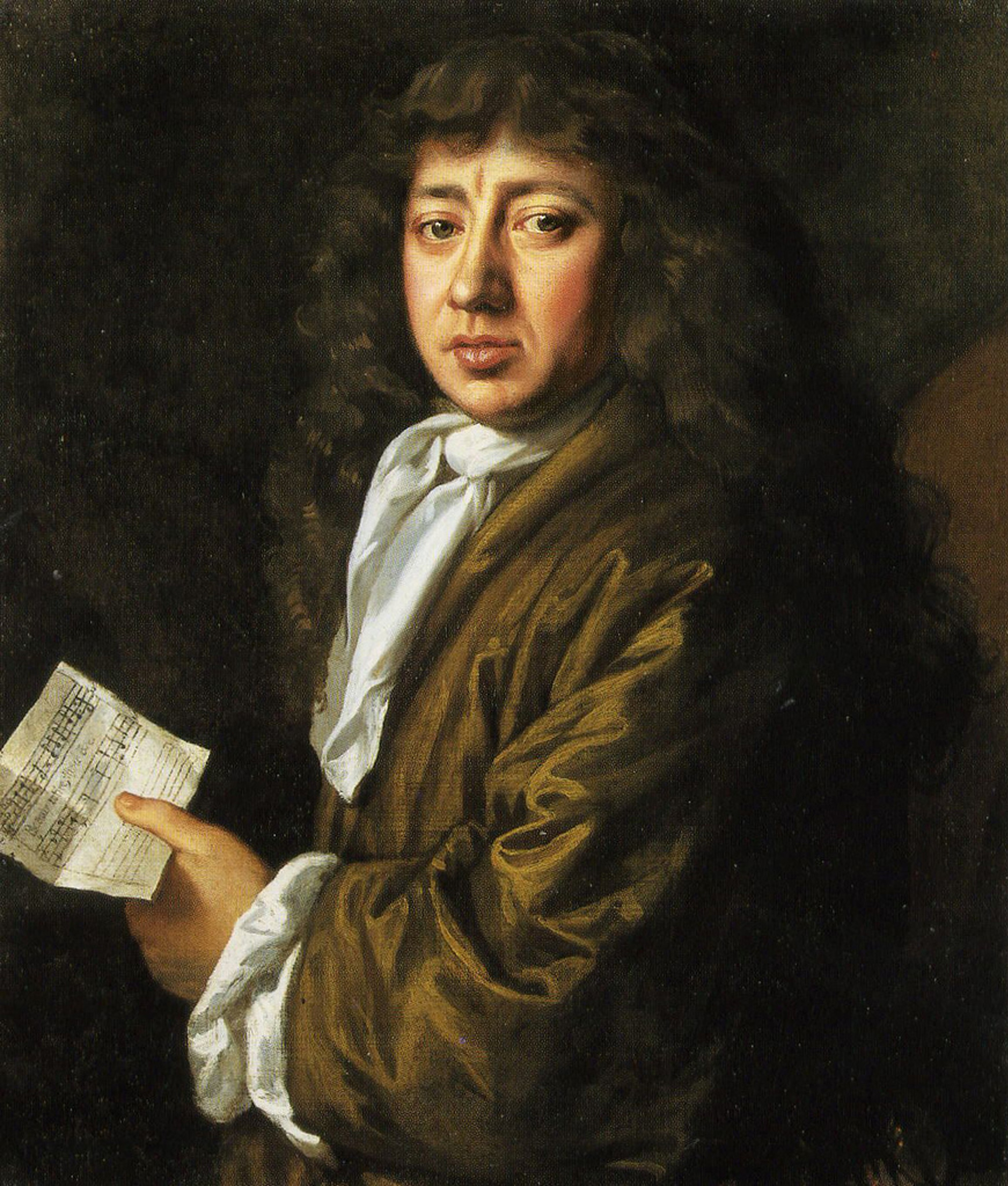
Samuel Pepys, baptised at St Bride's

St Bride's has had a number of notable parishioners, including John Milton, John Dryden, and the diarist Samuel Pepys, who was baptised in the church. Pepys buried his brother Tom in the church in 1664, but by this stage the vaults were so overcrowded that Pepys had to bribe the gravedigger to "justle together" the corpses in order to make room. In 2009, Sir Clement Freud's funeral was held in the church.

== Notable burials in the churchyard ==
- Roger Giffard, physician
- Richard Lovelace, poet
- Denis Papin, steam engine pioneer
- Thomas Pellett, physician
- Samuel Richardson, novelist
- Thomas Weelkes, composer
- William Charles Wells, physician, formulated early ideas of natural selection

== Gallery ==
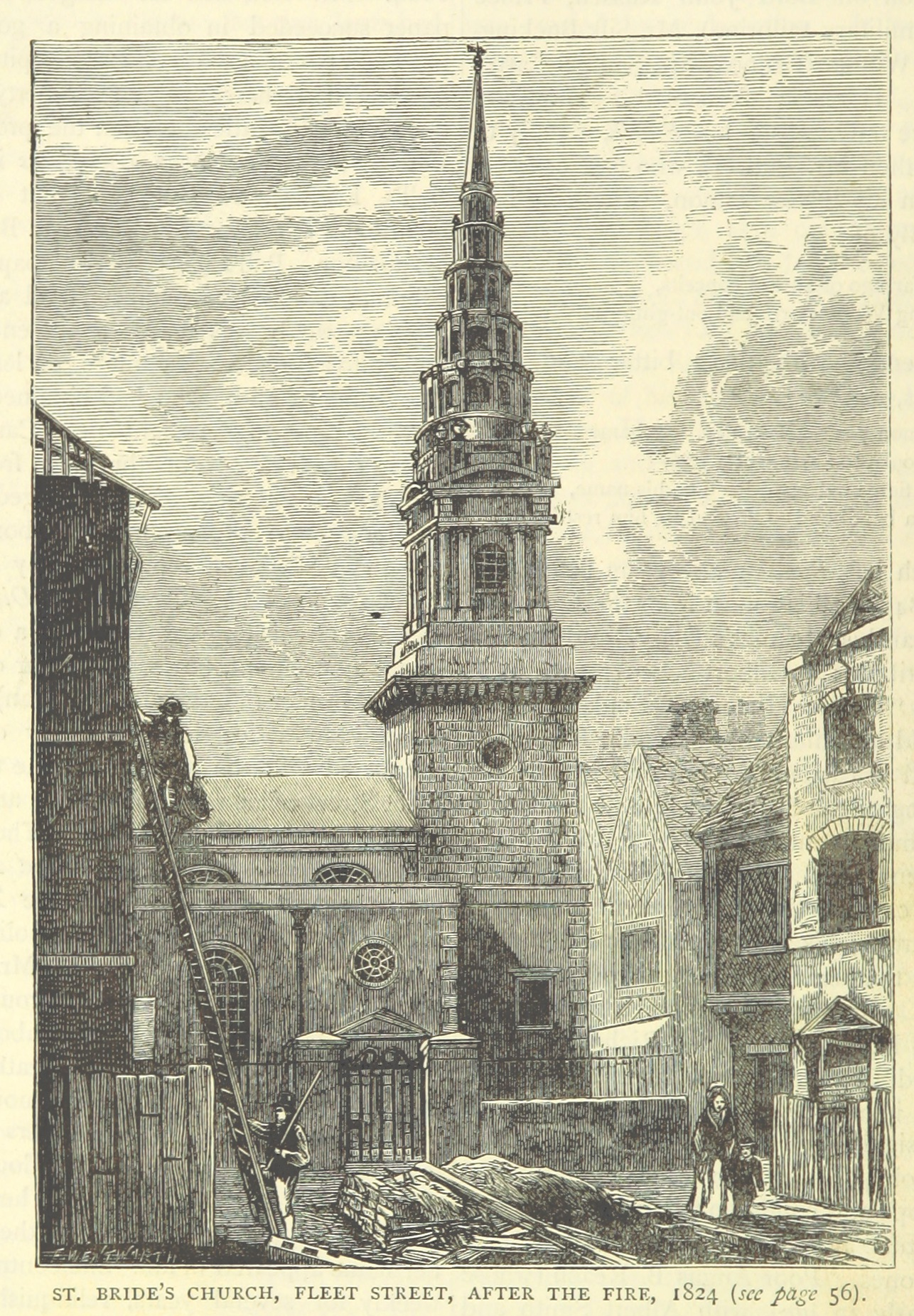
St Bride's Church, 1824

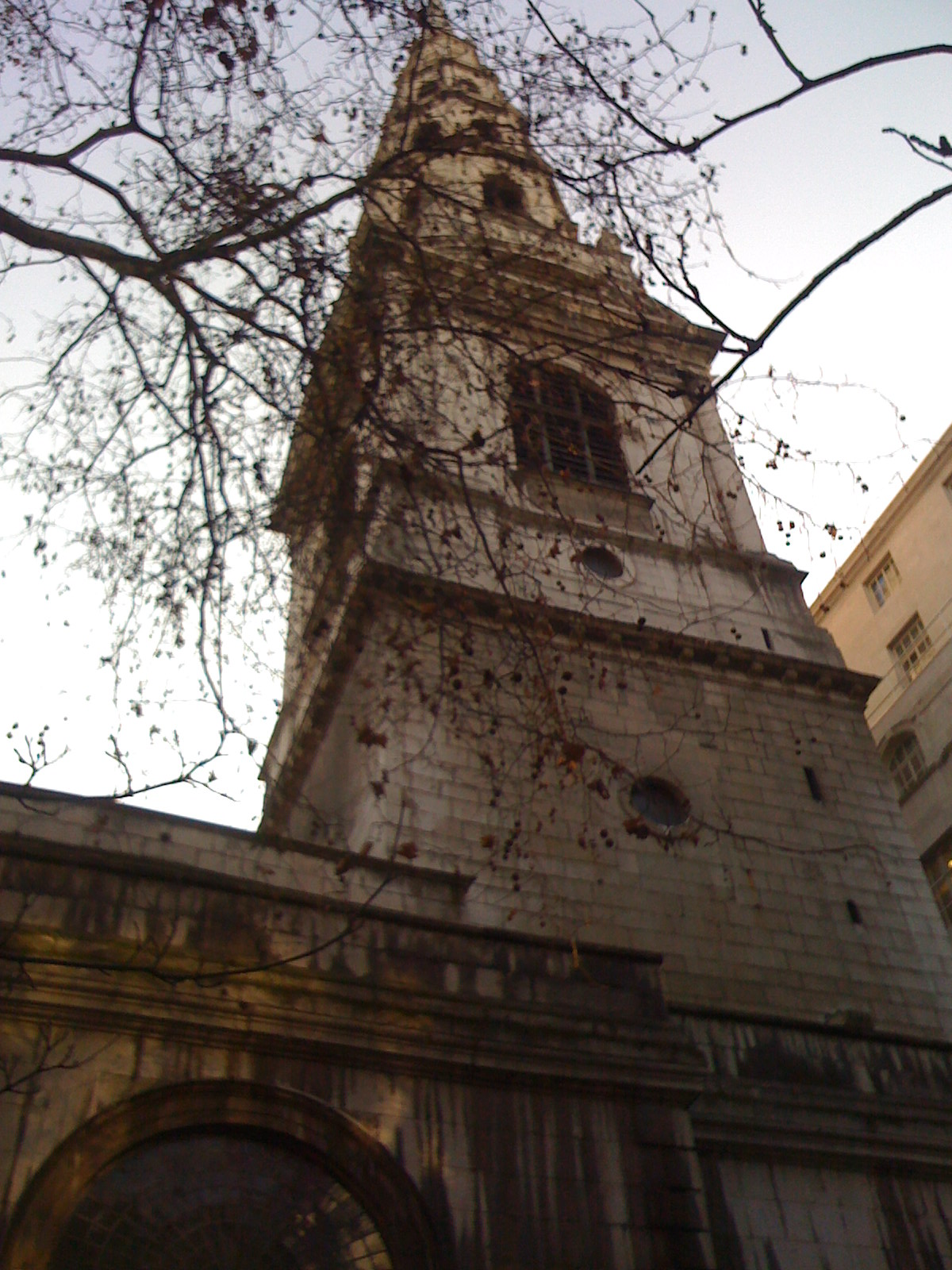
St Bride's Spire in 2009

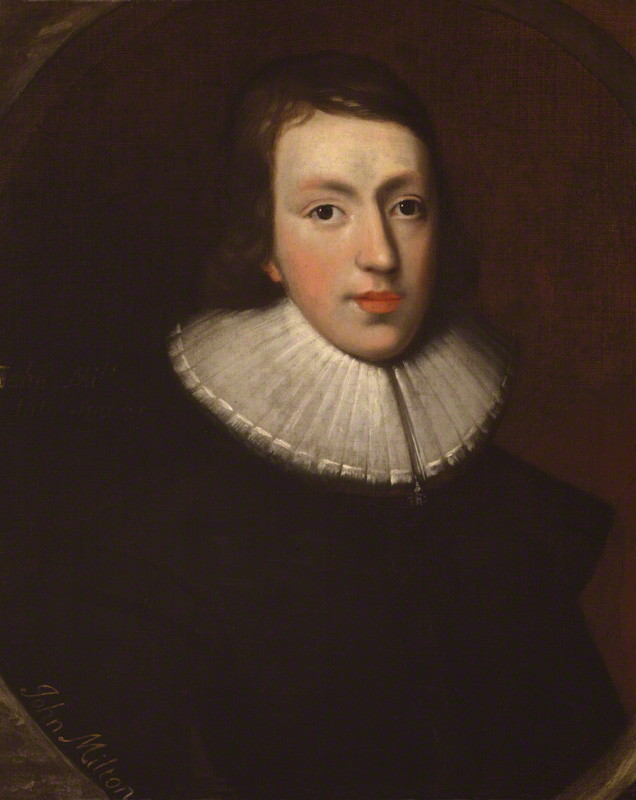
John Milton, parishioner of St Bride's

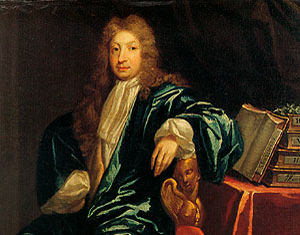
John Dryden, parishioner of St Bride's

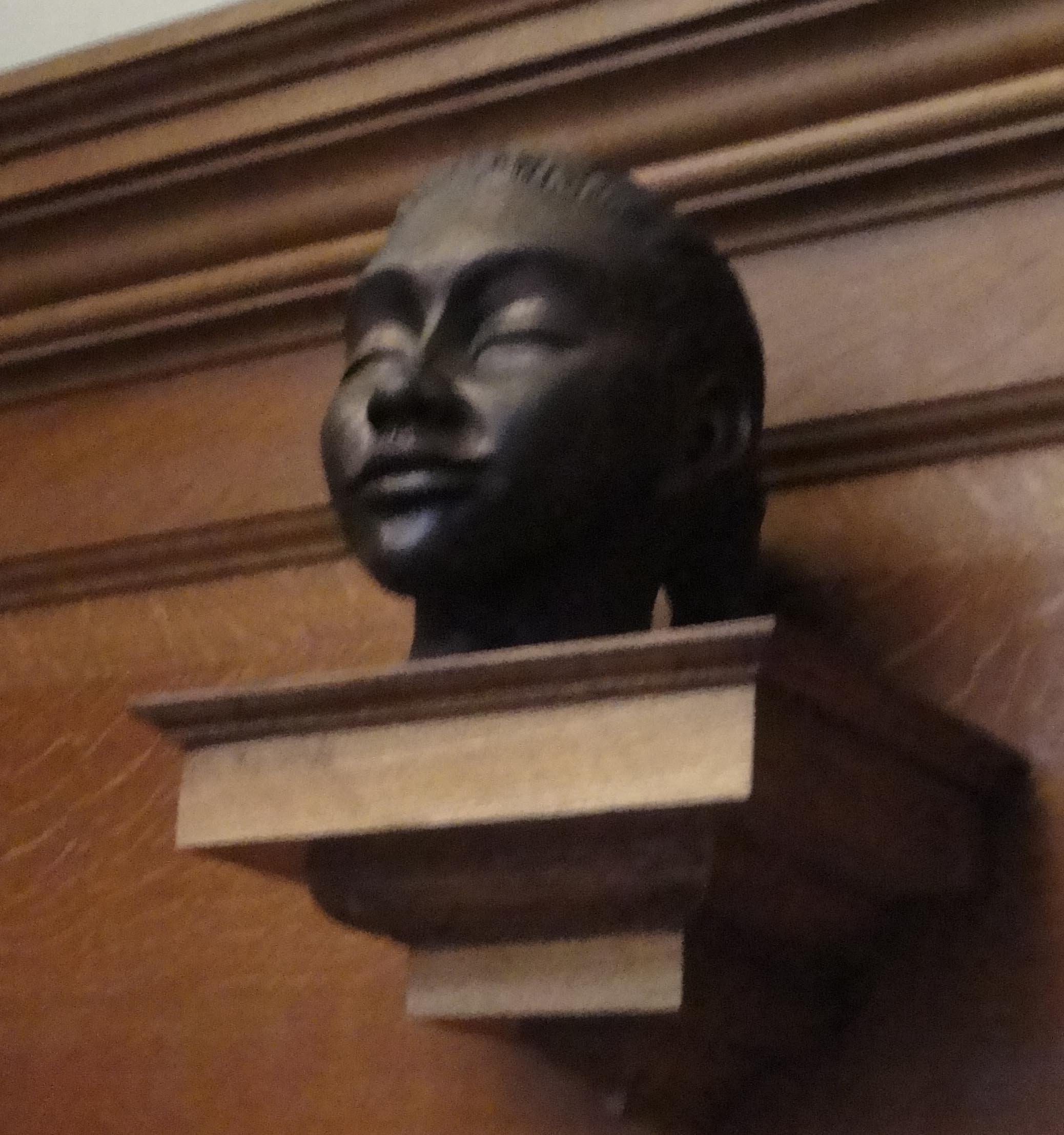
Replacement memorial to Virginia Dare, first child of English parents born in North America.

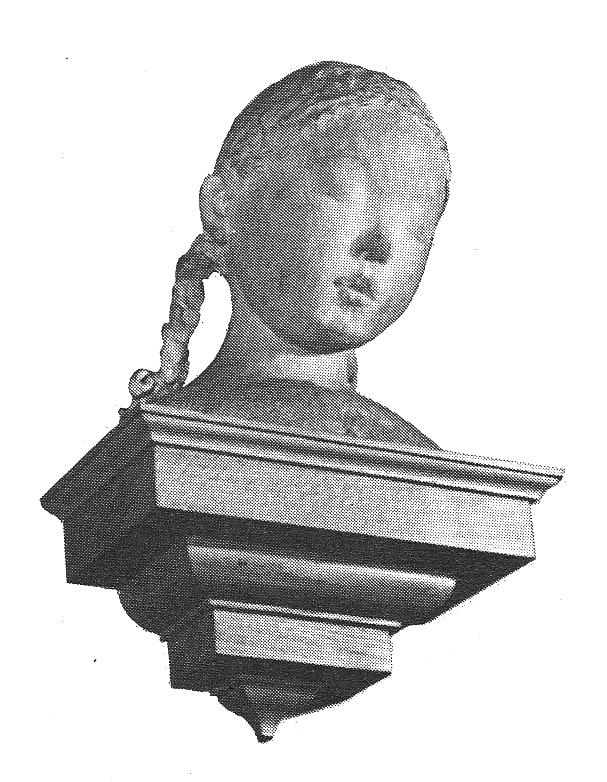
Marble sculpture of Virginia Dare formerly in St Bride's, which was stolen in 1999.

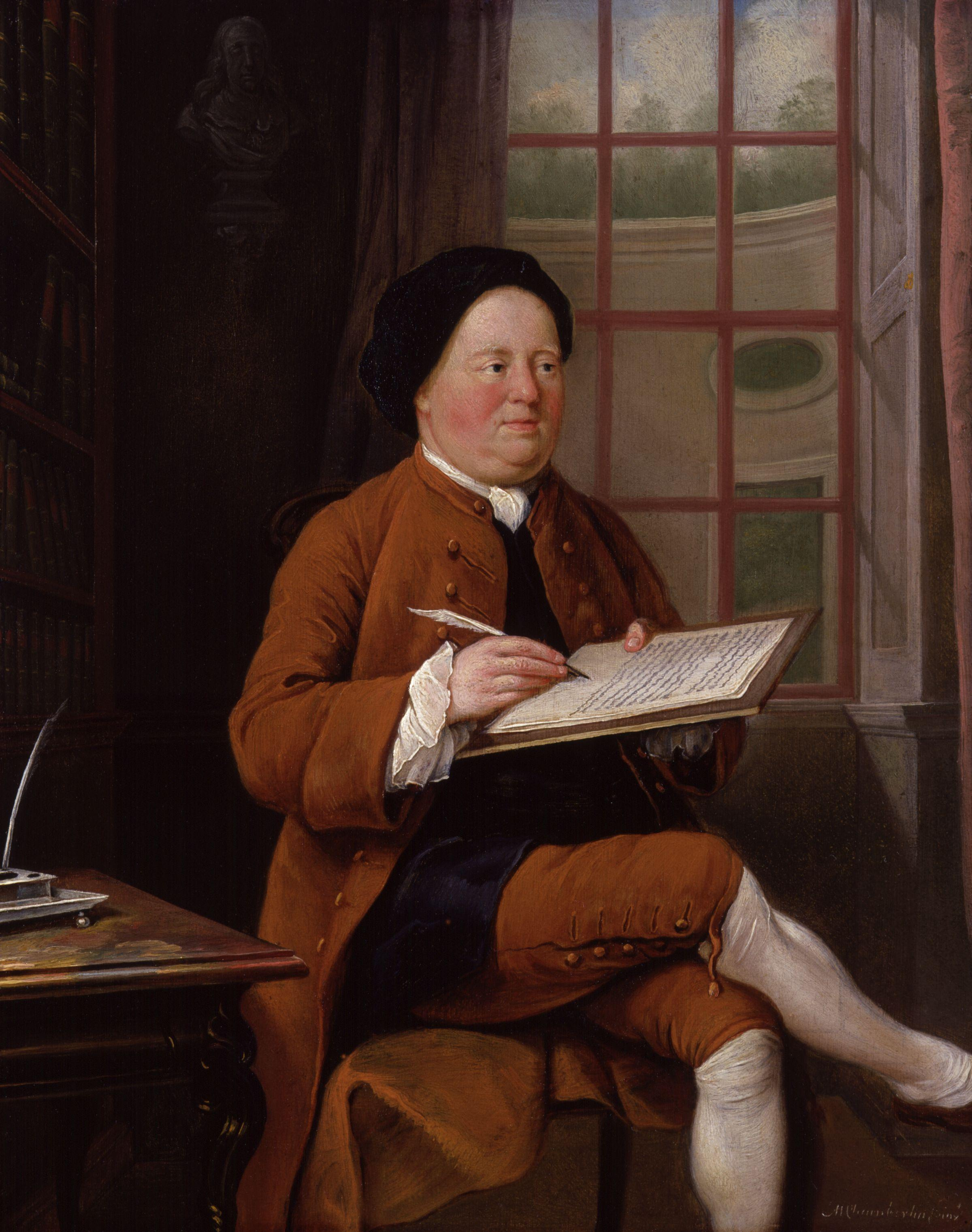
Samuel Richardson, buried in St Bride's

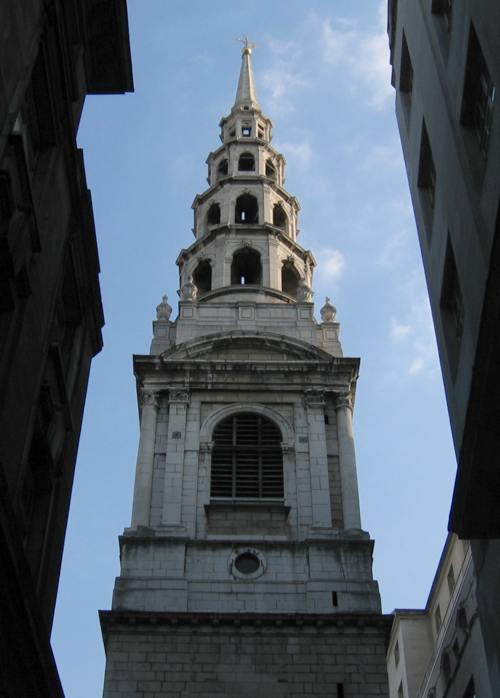
Exterior of St Bride's Church from Fleet Street, with spire

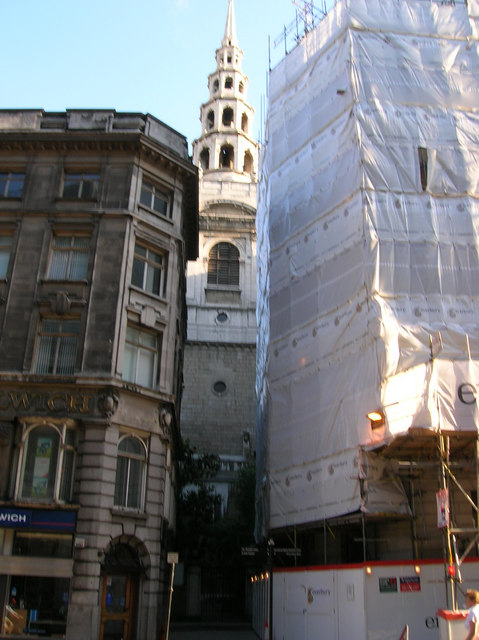
St Bride's Church, St Bride's Avenue

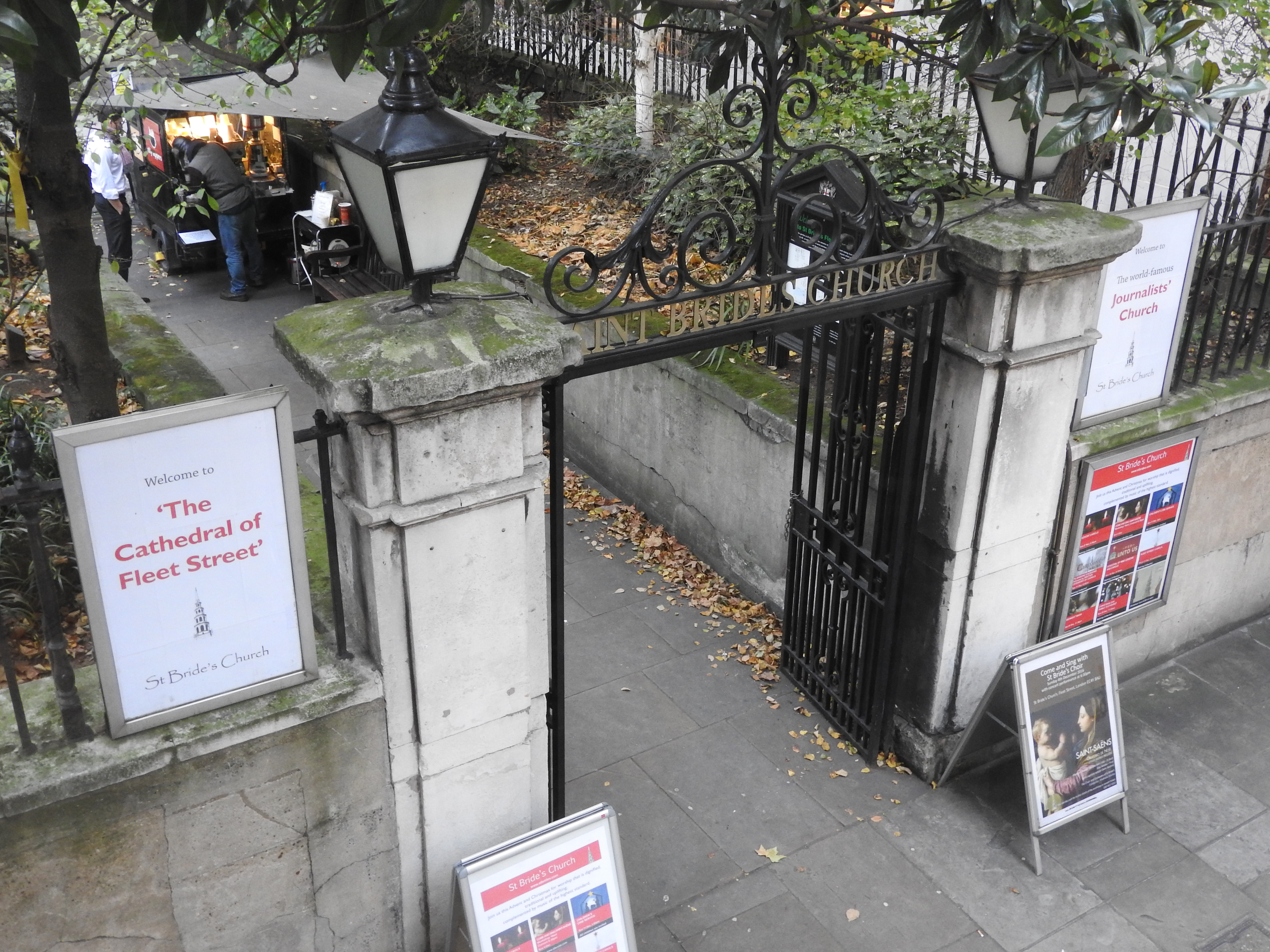
St Bride's Church, Mayday Rooms

== See also ==
- Bridewell Theatre
- List of Christopher Wren churches in London
- St Bride Library
- Anna Popplewell – British actress from The Chronicles of Narnia who portrayed Susan Pevensie: also a member of the congregation as her mother Debra Lomas was a churchwarden.

== Bibliography ==
- Dailey, Donna; Tomedi, John (2005). London. Infobase Publishing. p. 48. ISBN 978-1-4381-1555-9.
- Hatts, Leigh (2003). London City Churches. Bankside Press. p. 34. ISBN 978-0-9545705-0-7.
- Milne, Gustav (1997). St. Bride's Church London: Archaeological research 1952-60 and 1992-5. English Heritage. ISBN 978-1-84802-204-1.
- Milne, Gustav; Cohen, Nathalie (2001). Excavations at Medieval Cripplegate, London: Archaeology after the Blitz, 1946-68. English Heritage. ISBN 978-1-84802-147-1.
- Schofield, John (1994). "Saxon and Medieval Parish Churches in the City of London: a Review". Transactions of the London and Middlesex Archaeological Society. 2.45. doi:10.5284/1087602.
- Milton, Giles, Big Chief Elizabeth – How England's Adventurers Gambled and Won the New World, Hodder & Stoughton, London (2000)
- Morgan, Dewi (1973). Phoenix of Fleet St – 2,000 years of St Bride's. Charles Knight & Co., London. ISBN 0-85314-196-7.
- Olson, Donald (2004). Frommer's London from $90 a Day. Wiley. p. 175. ISBN 978-0-7645-5822-1.
- Steves, Rick; Openshaw, Gene (2010). Rick Steves' London 2011. Avalon Travel Publishing. p. 237. ISBN 978-1-59880-697-7.
