= Greyware =

Greyware may refer to:

- Grey ware, a type of pottery made of a grey paste
- Grayware, unwanted applications or files that are not classified as malware, but can worsen the performance of computers and cause security risks
- Greyware Automation Products, a time synchronization software manufacturer; see Control Panel (Windows)
