= Thomas Pellett =

English physician

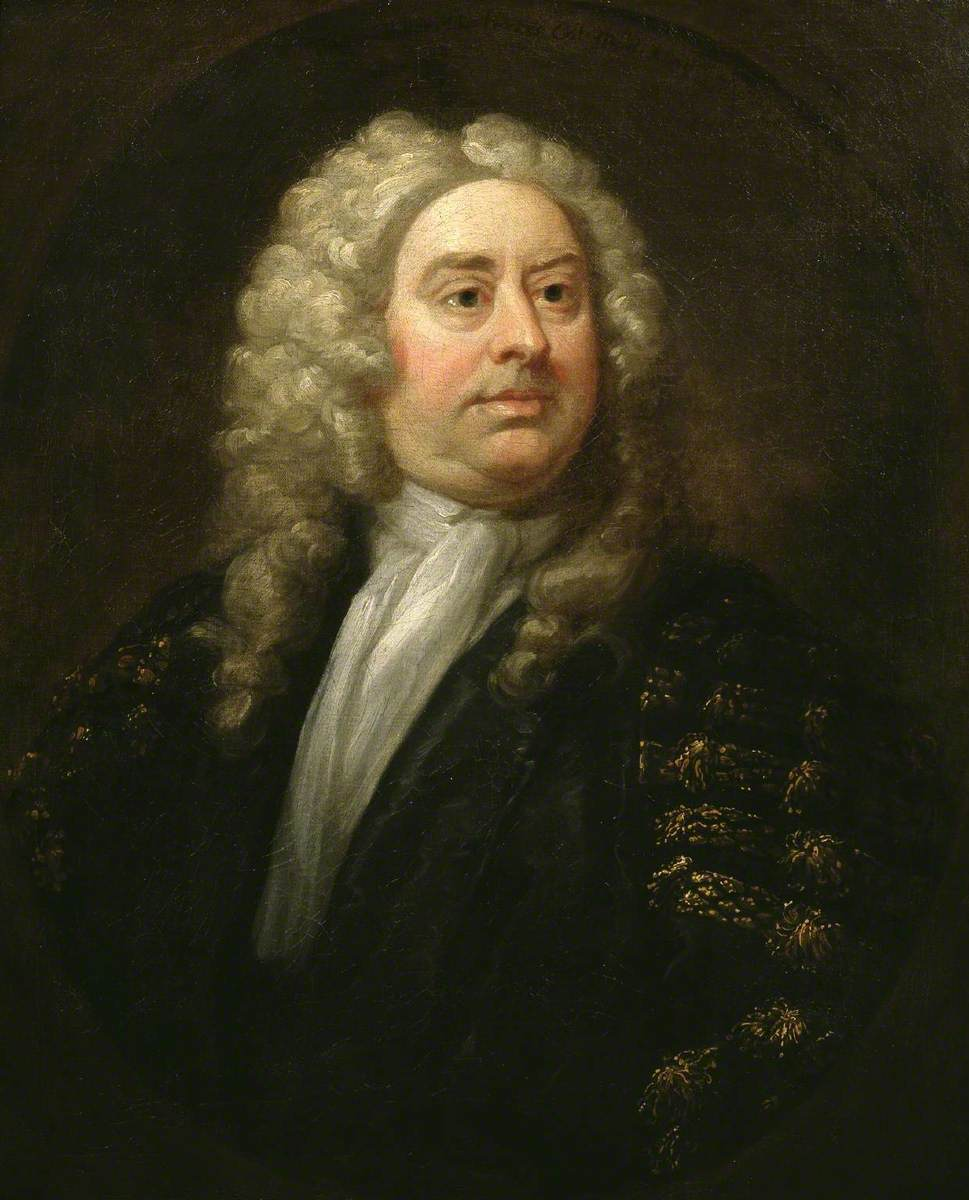
- Pellett by William Hogarth
- Born: 1671? Sussex
- Died: 4 July 1744; London
- Occupation: Physician

Thomas Pellett (1671? – 4 July 1744) was an English physician.

== Biography ==
Pellett was born in Sussex about 1671, and was admitted at Queens' College, Cambridge, on 8 June 1689. He graduated M.B. in 1694, and in 1695 went to Italy with Dr. Richard Mead, and resided in the university of Padua. In 1705 he was created M.D. at Cambridge, and on 22 December 1707 was admitted a candidate at the College of Physicians in London, where he began practice, and resided in Henrietta Street, Covent Garden; he was elected a fellow on 9 April 1716, was censor in 1717, 1720, and 1727, and president 1735–9. He delivered the Harveian oration on 19 October 1719, and it was finely printed in quarto by S. Buckley of Amen Corner. It is remarkable as the only one of the published Harveian orations which is partly in verse, and the only one in which a knight of the Garter, John, second duke of Montagu, a doctor of medicine of Cambridge, is congratulated on having become a fellow. The works of Linacre, Glisson, Wharton, and Harvey are well described, and the whole oration is both graceful and lively. Pellett edited Sir Isaac Newton's ‘Chronology of Ancient Kingdoms’ with Martin Folkes in 1728. He felt the difficulties of private practice keenly, and inclined to give his time chiefly to medical study and to general learning. He died in London on 4 July 1744, and was buried in St. Bride's Church, Fleet Street, where he is commemorated by an inscription on a brass plate. His portrait, painted by Michael Dahl, hangs on the staircase of the College of Physicians, and was engraved by John Faber (Bromley).
