= Virginia Dare =

First English child born in the Americas (1587–unknown)

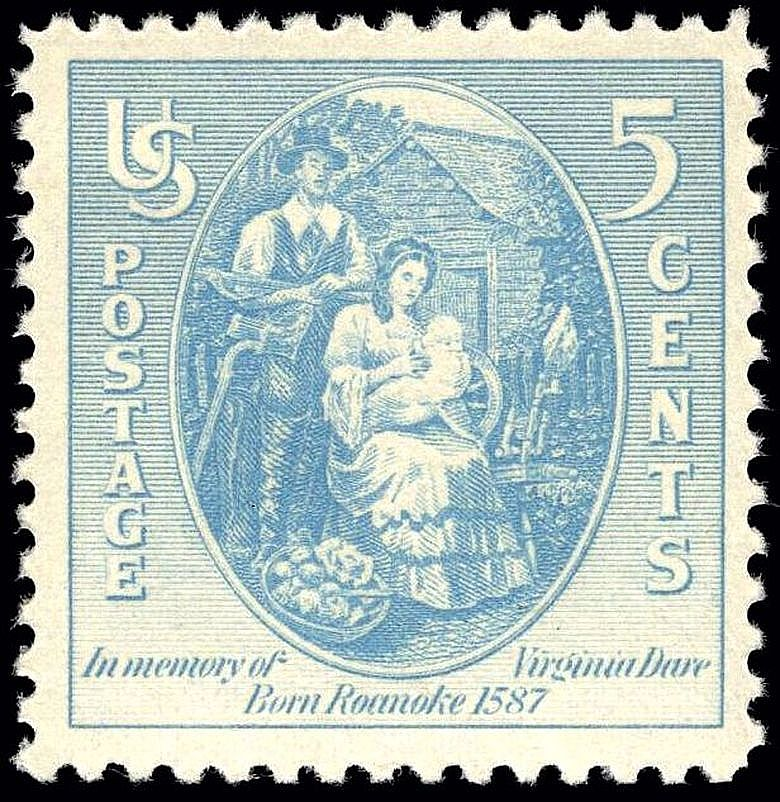
- US postage stamp issued in 1937, the 350th anniversary of Virginia Dare's birth
- Born: August 18, 1587; Roanoke Colony (present-day North Carolina)
- Disappeared: before August 18, 1590
- Died: Unknown likely Roanoke Island or other neighboring areas of the Eastern part of modern-day North Carolina
- Known for: first English child born in the New World
- Parents: Ananias Dare (father); Eleanor White (mother)

Virginia Dare (August 18, 1587 – unknown) was the first English child to be born in an American English colony. She was born to members of the Roanoke Colony.

What became of Virginia and the other colonists remains a mystery. The fact of her birth is known because John White, Virginia's grandfather and the governor of the colony, returned to England in 1587 to seek fresh supplies. When White eventually returned three years later, the colonists were gone.

During the past four hundred years, Virginia Dare has become a prominent figure in American myth and folklore, symbolizing different things to different groups of people. She has been featured as a main character in books, poems, songs, comic books, television programs, and films. Her name has been used to sell different types of goods, from vanilla products to soft drinks, as well as wine and spirits. Many places in North Carolina and elsewhere in the Southern United States have been named in her honor, especially Dare County.

== Biography ==
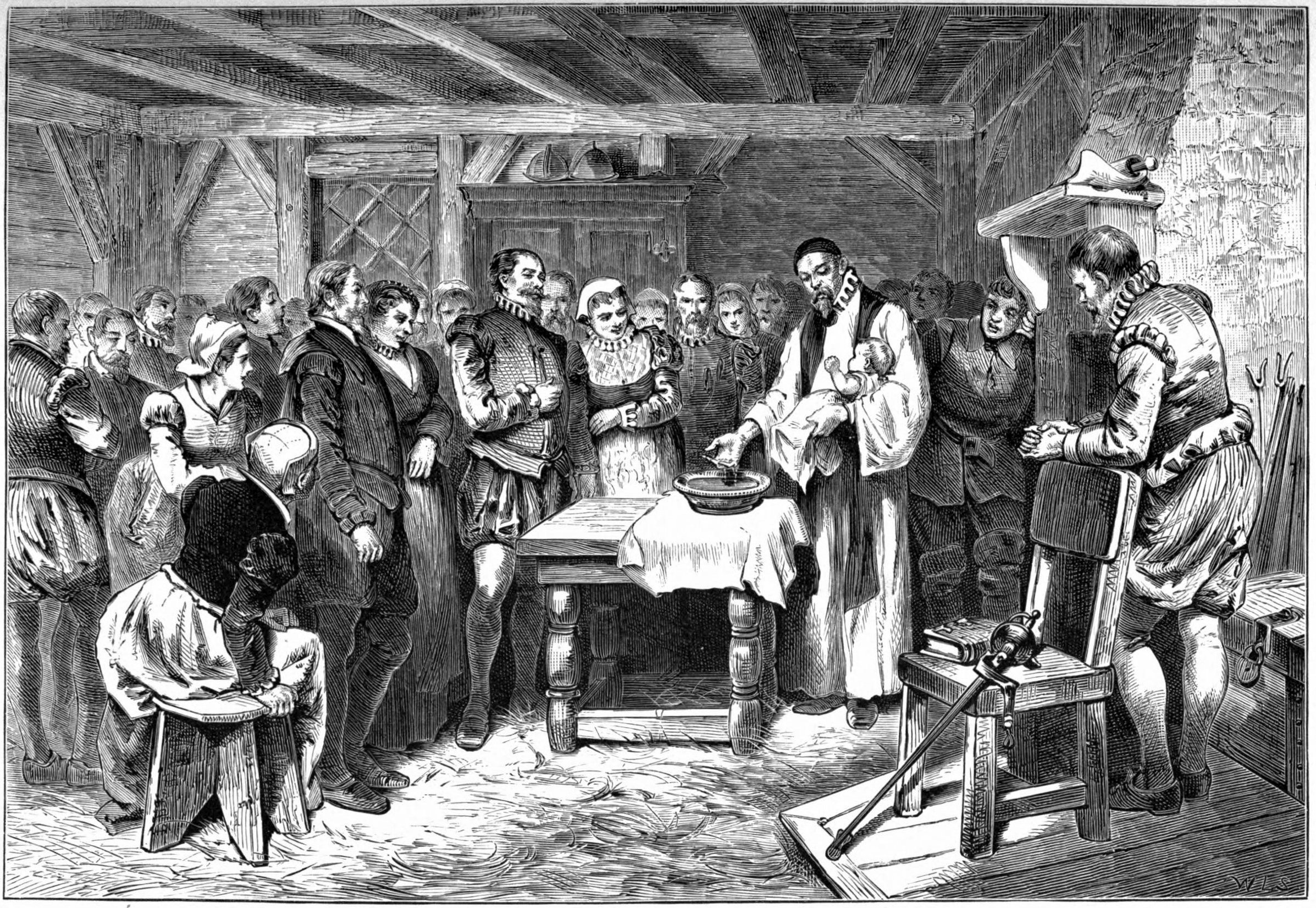
Baptism of Virginia Dare, wood-engraving, 1880

Virginia Dare was born in the Roanoke Colony in what is now North Carolina in August 1587, the first child born in the New World to English parents. "Elenora, daughter to the governor of the city and wife to Ananias Dare, one of the assistants, was delivered of a daughter in Roanoke".

Little is known of the lives of either of her parents. Her mother Eleanor was born in London around 1568 and was the daughter of John White, the governor of the ill-fated Roanoke Colony. Eleanor married Ananias Dare (born c. 1560), a London tiler and bricklayer, at St Bride's Church on Fleet Street in the City of London. He, too, was part of the Roanoke expedition. Virginia Dare was one of two infants born to the colonists in 1587 and the only female child known to have been born to the settlers.

Nothing else is known of Virginia Dare's life, as the Roanoke Colony did not endure. Virginia's grandfather John White sailed for England for fresh supplies at the end of 1587, having established his colony. Because England's war with Spain brought about a pressing need for ships to defend against the Spanish Armada, he was unable to return to Roanoke until August 18, 1590, by which time he found that the settlement had been long deserted. The buildings had collapsed and "the houses [were] taken down"; White was unable to find any trace of his daughter or granddaughter, or any of the other 80 men, 17 women, and 11 children who made up the "Lost Colony".

== Mystery of the "Lost Colony" (Roanoke) ==
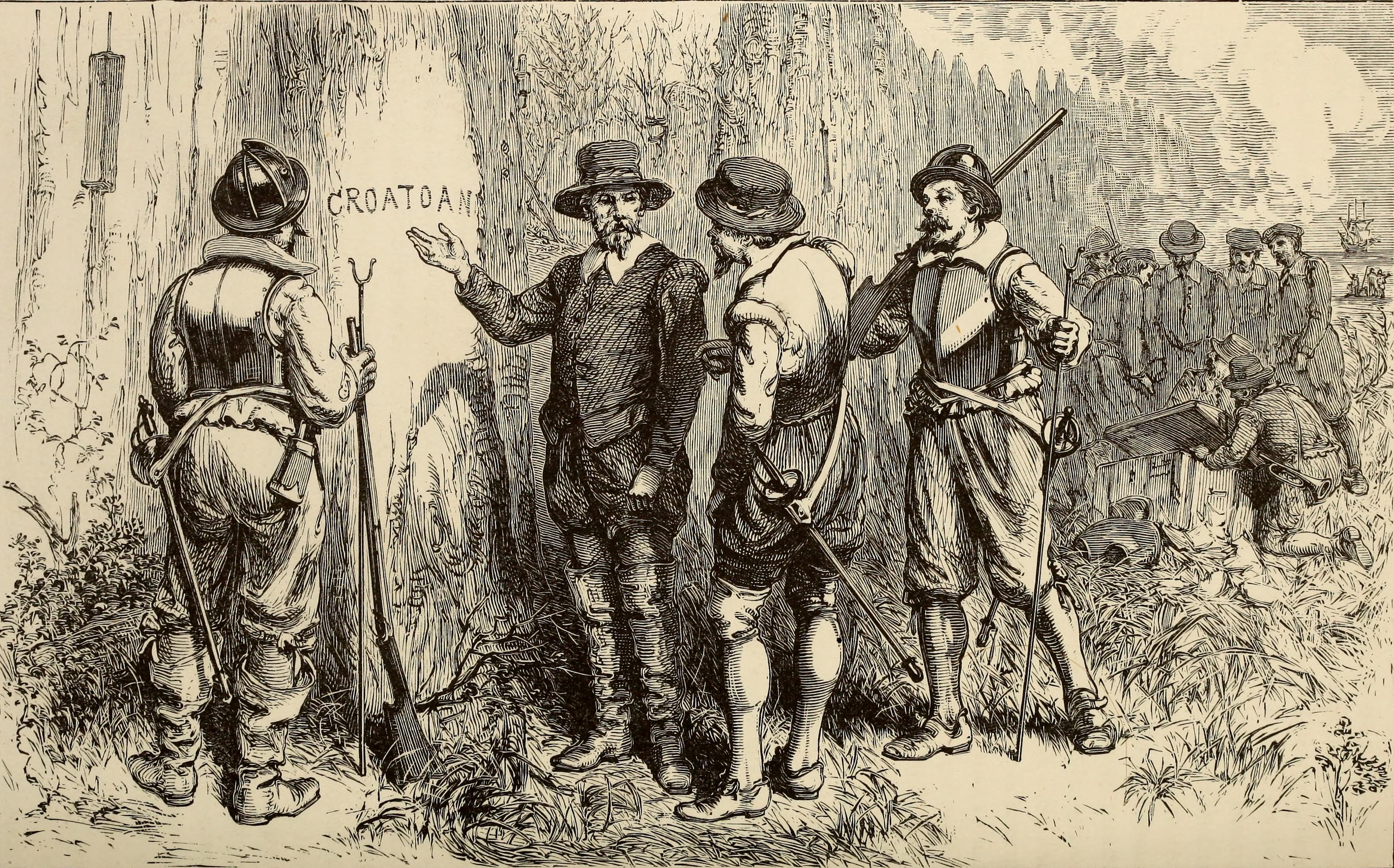
The return of Governor White to the "Lost Colony"

Nothing is known for certain of the fate of Virginia Dare or her fellow colonists. Governor White found no sign of a struggle or battle. The only clue to the colonists' fate was the word "Croatoan" carved into a post of the fort, and the letters "Cro" carved into a nearby tree. All the houses and fortifications had been dismantled, suggesting that their departure had not been hurried. Before he had left the colony, White had instructed them that, if anything happened to them, they should carve a Maltese cross on a tree nearby, indicating that their disappearance had been forced. There was no cross, and White took this to mean that they had moved to Croatoan Island (now known as Hatteras Island), but he was unable to conduct a search.

There are a number of theories regarding the fate of the colonists, the most widely accepted one being that they sought shelter with local Native American tribes, and either intermarried with the natives or were killed. In 1607, John Smith and other members of the successful Jamestown Colony sought information about the fate of the Roanoke colonists. One report indicated that the survivors had taken refuge with friendly Chesapeake Indians, but Chief Powhatan claimed that his tribe had attacked the group and killed most of the colonists. Powhatan showed Smith certain artifacts that he said had belonged to the colonists, including a musket barrel and a brass mortar and pestle. However, no archaeological evidence exists to support this claim. The Jamestown Colony received reports of some survivors of the Lost Colony and sent out search parties, but none were successful. Eventually they determined that all survivors had died.

William Strachey, a secretary of the Jamestown Colony, wrote in The Historie of Travaile Into Virginia Britannia in 1612 that there were reportedly two-story houses with stone walls at the Indian settlements of Peccarecanick and Ochanahoen. The Indians supposedly learned how to build them from the Roanoke settlers. There were also reported sightings of European captives at various Indian settlements during the same time period. Strachey also wrote that four English men, two boys, and one maid had been sighted at the Eno settlement of Ritanoc, under the protection of a chief called Eyanoco. The captives were forced to beat copper. The captives, he reported, had escaped the attack on the other colonists and fled up the Chaonoke river, the present-day Chowan River in Bertie County, North Carolina.

== Legacy ==
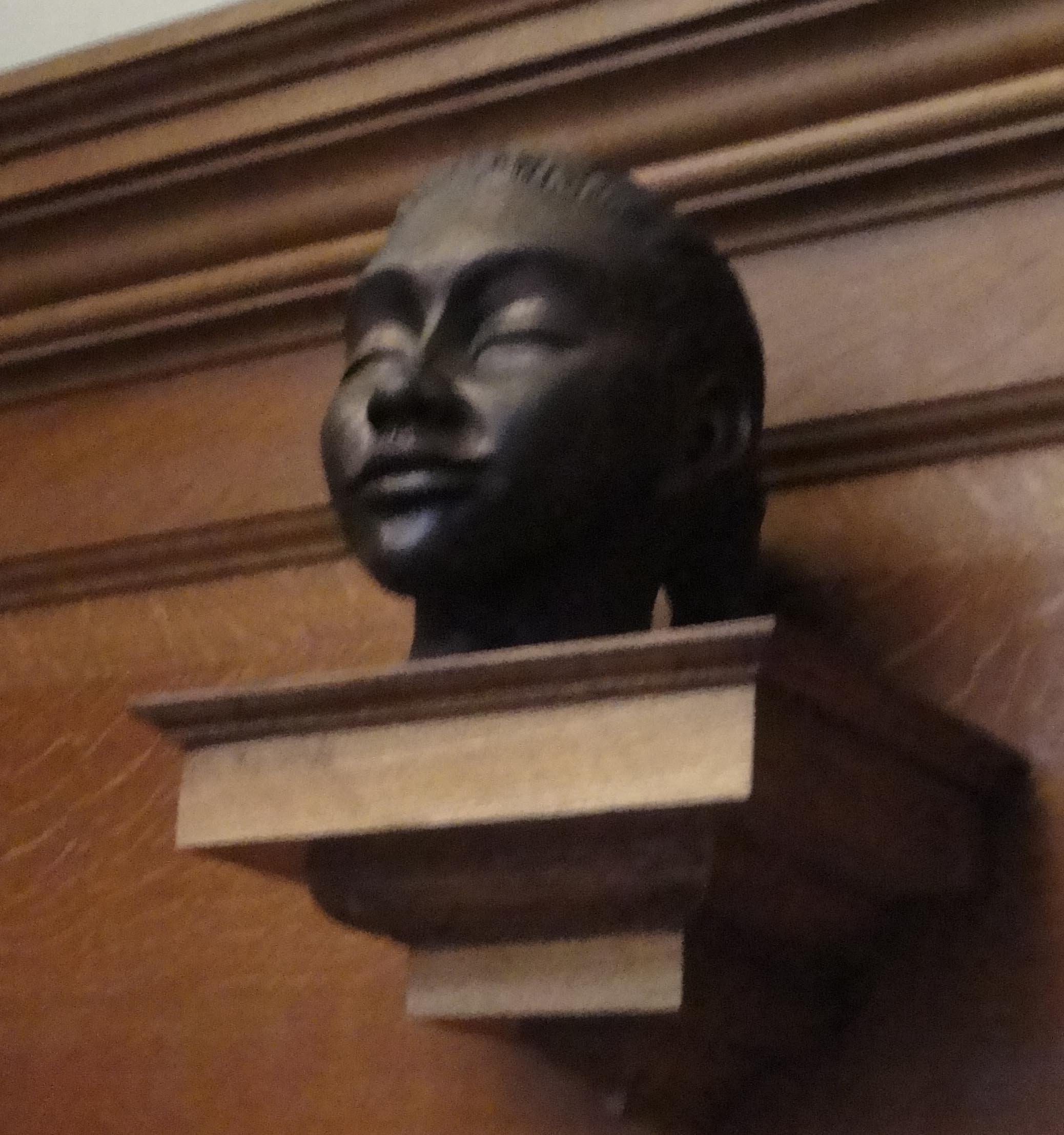
Memorial to Virginia Dare at St Bride's Church, Fleet St, London

Virginia Dare has become a prominent figure in American myth and folklore in the more than four hundred years since her birth, representing different things to different people. A 2000 article in the Piedmont (North Carolina) Triad News and Record noted that she symbolizes innocence and purity for many Americans (particularly Southerners), "new beginnings, promise, and hope" as well as "adventure and bravery" in a new land. She also symbolizes mystery because of her mysterious fate. Some also see Dare as a symbol of women's rights. In the 1980s, feminists in North Carolina called for state residents to approve the Equal Rights Amendment and "Honor Virginia Dare."

There is a memorial to Virginia Dare in St Bride's Church, Fleet Street in the City of London, where her parents were married prior to their journey to Roanoke. The bronze sculpture was created by Clare Waterhouse in 1999. It replaced a marble sculpture of Dare carved by Marjorie Meggit in 1957, which was stolen in 1999 and never recovered.

In other contexts, Dare has been adopted as an icon by white nationalists. In the 1920s, a group in Raleigh that opposed suffrage for women feared that black women would obtain the vote, urging "that North Carolina remain white ... in the name of Virginia Dare". The white nationalist publication VDARE is named for Dare.

=== Eleanor Dare stones ===
Virginia's death and the fate of the other colonists were purportedly described in a series of inscribed stones written by Eleanor Dare and others. Most of these were later revealed to be forgeries, with the authenticity of one remaining in dispute.

=== 1937 Roanoke commemorative coin ===
In 1937, the United States Mint issued a half-dollar commemorative coin that depicted Virginia Dare as the first English child born in the New World. This was also the first time that a child was depicted on United States currency.

=== Literary and cultural references ===
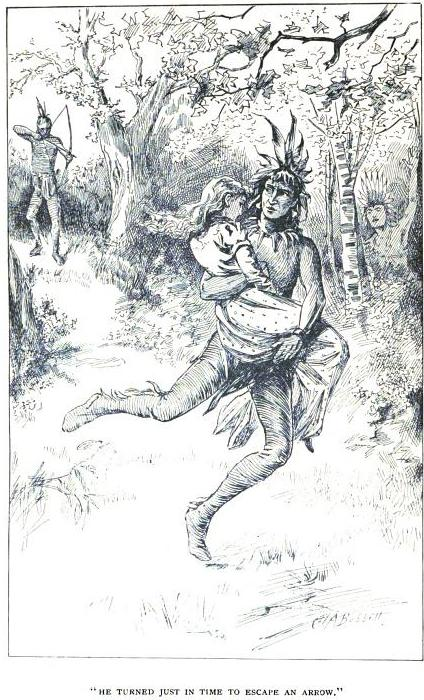
Illustration from Virginia Dare: A Romance of the Sixteenth Century, 19th century novel by Mrs. E.A.B. Shackelford loosely based on the life of Virginia Dare

Virginia Dare quickly entered into folklore as the first white child born in British America. The fate of Virginia Dare and the Lost Colony has been the subject of many literary, film, and television adaptations, all of which have added to her myth:

- One of the first was Cornelia Tuthill's 1840 novel Virginia Dare, or the Colony of Roanoke, in which Virginia marries a Jamestown settler. Virginia Dare met the Indian princess Pocahontas in E.A.B. Shackleford's 1892 novel Virginia Dare: A Romance of the Sixteenth Century. Virginia Dare was the main character in Sallie Southall Cotten's 1901 book in verse The White Doe: The Fate of Virginia Dare. In the book, she is turned into a white doe by an Indian witch doctor after she rejects his advances. When her true love, an Indian warrior, shoots her with a silver arrow, she turns back into a woman just before she dies in his arms. Cotten has asserted, however, that the tale of Dare as the White Doe had survived for some three centuries as part of colonial folklore. In the 1908 novel The Daughter of Virginia Dare, author Mary Virginia Wall made Pocahontas the daughter of Virginia Dare. In Herbert Bouldin Hawes' 1930 novel The Daughter of the Blood, Virginia Dare is involved in a romantic triangle with John Smith and Pocahontas.
- Neil Gaiman has extended this story in his comic book series 1602, where a Native American named Rojhaz meets Virginia Dare when she is about twelve, and an artifact of his travels causes her to transform into a series of white creatures whenever she is in danger. The storyline ends when Peter Parquagh and Virginia Dare head home to her father to plot the rescue of those left in England. In later stories in the 1602 universe (much like the figure of legend), when attempting to flee in the form of a white doe, she is shot by Master Norman Osborne and reverts to human form in front of Peter before dying.
- In Philip José Farmer's 1965 novel Dare, Virginia and the other Lost Colonists are abducted by aliens and settled on a planet called Dare.
- In 1969, Steve Cannon wrote Groove, Bang and Jive Around, in which Virginia Dare is one of two stewardesses aboard the Statecraft One who engages in a wild orgy with Annette, the foxy adolescent girl from New Orleans, and Estavanico, "Little Stevie" to some, the flight engineer. Near the end, in the land of Oobladee, she is eventually magically transformed into a frail, old woman with a cane, who explains the reasons for which she was left to explore much darker horizons, sexually. Ultimately, she falls to the floor as a pile of ashes.
- Virginia Dare appears in Mark Chadbourn's fantasy trilogy Kingdom of the Serpent, encompassing the novels Jack of Ravens, The Burning Man, and Destroyer of Worlds. She is kidnapped along with the other Roanoke colonists and taken to the Celtic Otherworld, the home of all myth and legend. She plays a key role in the final volume of the trilogy.
- A woman named Virginia Dare appears in Gregory Keyes' fantasy novel The Briar King. Keyes uses several hints and word clues to indicate this character is meant to be the historical figure.
- In Volume I of Tales of the Slayer, a horror story collection set in the Buffy the Vampire Slayer universe, Virginia Dare appears as the vampire slayer "White Doe", an English girl adopted by the Croatoan Indians. She is turned into a white doe by a wizard of the tribe when she rejects his advances. Her true love, Seal of the Ocean, finds her but later kills her because he does not recognize her as a deer.
- Dare is the main villain in the short-lived television show FreakyLinks. Inspired by The X-Files and The Blair Witch Project, it follows a young man who takes over his twin brother's paranormal website, Freakylinks, after his death. It is later found that his brother's death was related to his investigations into the lost colony of Roanoke. It is implied that Virginia Dare was a demon who destroyed the colonists, either directly or indirectly. However, the show was canceled before the end of the first season, and the mystery was never resolved.
- In the 2007 made-for-TV movie on the SciFi Channel, Wraiths of Roanoke, Virginia Dare is the sole survivor after the colony is wiped out by Old Norse ghosts, or wraiths, who had died on the island centuries earlier but failed to achieve transit to Valhalla. In the movie the infant Virginia, whose innocence is needed by the wraiths, is used by her father to lure the wraiths onto a flaming raft set adrift for a Viking funeral. The last act of Ananias is to cast Virginia away from the raft in a wicker basket. She is found and adopted by the mainland Indians the next day.
- In The Necromancer, the fourth book in Michael Scott's "Secrets of the Immortal Nicholas Flamel" series, Virginia Dare was introduced as an immortal who disables her enemies with charms from a magic flute. It is later revealed in the story that her father is the one who carved the word "Croatoan" onto the fence post and part of the tree.
- In Sabotaged, the third book of the "Missing Series" by Margaret Peterson Haddix, Virginia Dare is a missing child from history who had been kidnapped by one of the evil villains when she was a child, but then accidentally landed in the twenty-first century. The main characters, Jonah and Katherine, are sent back into time, again, to return her to the colony. However, Andrea (also called Virginia) is tricked by a mysterious character named Second to sabotage the mission. The book takes place in Roanoke Island and they eventually travel to Croatoan Island.
- In the 2011 faux-Southern Gothic show The Heart, She Holler the town matriarch, commonly referred to as "Meemaw", is named Virginia Dare. In Season 3 it is confirmed that she is the actual Virginia Dare, "the first white person born on this continent". Her birth so offended the gods of the indigenous peoples that she was "cursed" with immortality and various psychic powers including but not limited to telekinesis, extrasensory perception, and unexplained reality bending powers.
- She is a character in the novel The Last American Vampire written by Seth Grahame-Smith.
- She is mentioned in the Sleepy Hollow season 1 episode "John Doe", which features the lost Roanoke colony.
- She is mentioned in the 2022 novel The Lost Book of Eleanor Dare by Kimberly Brock.

=== Tourism and advertising ===
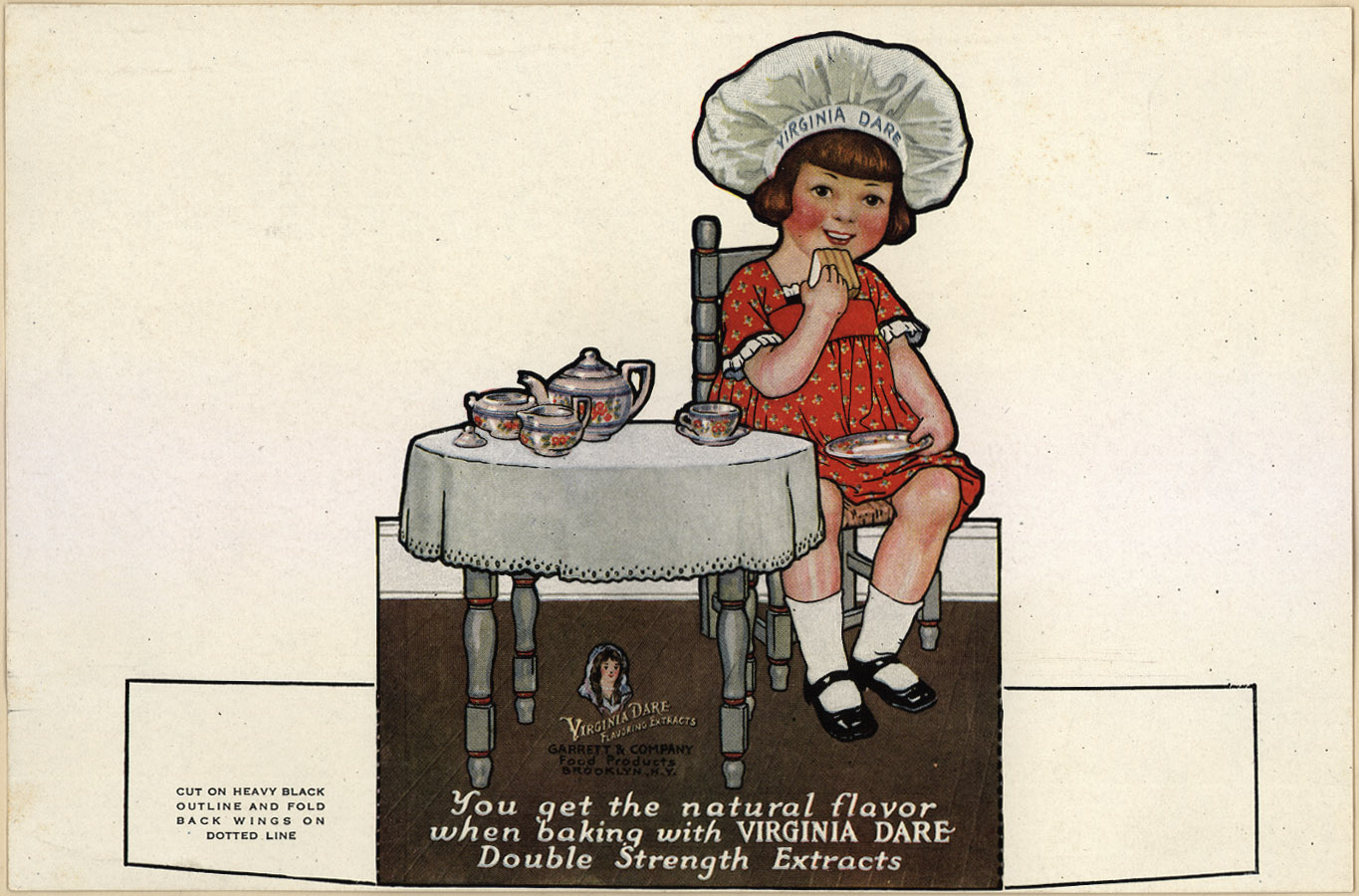
Virginia Dare Flavoring Extracts

Virginia Dare's name has become a tourist attraction for North Carolina. Many locations are named after her, including Dare County, North Carolina; the Virginia Dare Trail, a section of NC 12; Virginia Dare Memorial Bridge, the second, newest, and widest bridge spanning the Croatan Sound connecting Roanoke Island to Manns Harbor, carrying US 64. Residents of Roanoke Island celebrate Virginia Dare's birthday each year with an Elizabethan Renaissance fair. A statue of Virginia as a grown woman, nude and wrapped in a fishnet, is on display in the Elizabethan Gardens on the island. At Smith Mountain Lake, a reservoir in Virginia created by damming the Roanoke River, there is an active tour boat named Virginia Dare.

Virginia Dare's name has also been used to sell a number of products. Virginia Dare was the name of the first commercial wine to sell after the repeal of Prohibition in 1933. The Virginia Dare Extract Company, a maker of vanilla products, sells its products with a symbol of Virginia as a fresh-faced, blonde girl wearing a white ruffled mob cap. The company's website notes that Virginia Dare symbolizes "wholesomeness and purity". In Rancho Cucamonga, California, a now-defunct winery called Virginia Dare is on the corner of Haven Avenue and Foothill Boulevard (U.S. Route 66).

== Ships named after her ==
- SS Virginia Dare was a Liberty ship built in the United States during World War II.
- Schooner Virginia Dare, 89.41 tons, built in 1883 in Essex and owned by Pool, Gardner & Co. of Gloucester.
- Steamship Virginia Dare, which was grounded on an offshore sandbar at Galveston Island during 1871 Atlantic hurricane season.

== Gallery ==
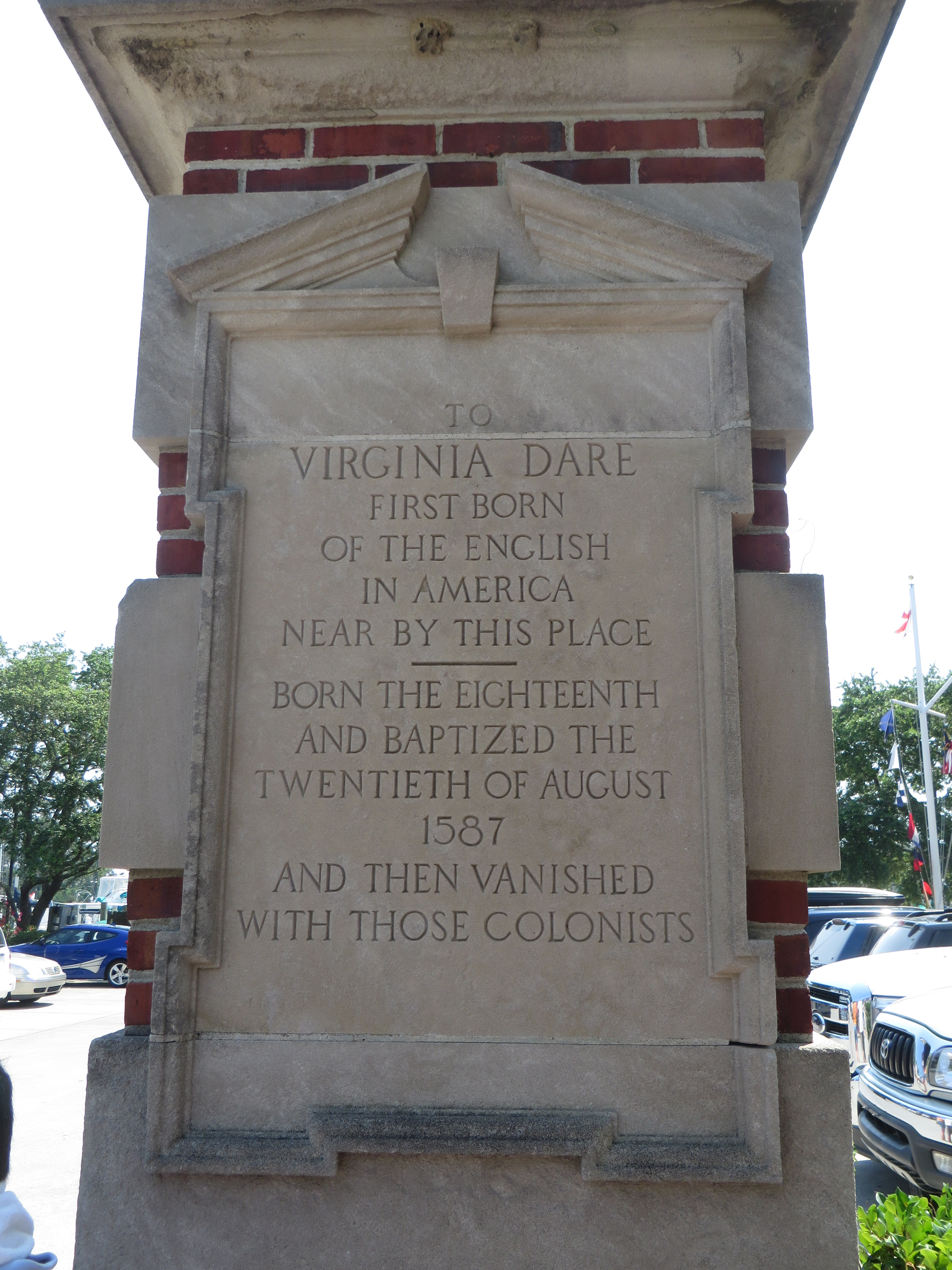
Monument to Virginia Dare, Manteo, Roanoke Island, North Carolina

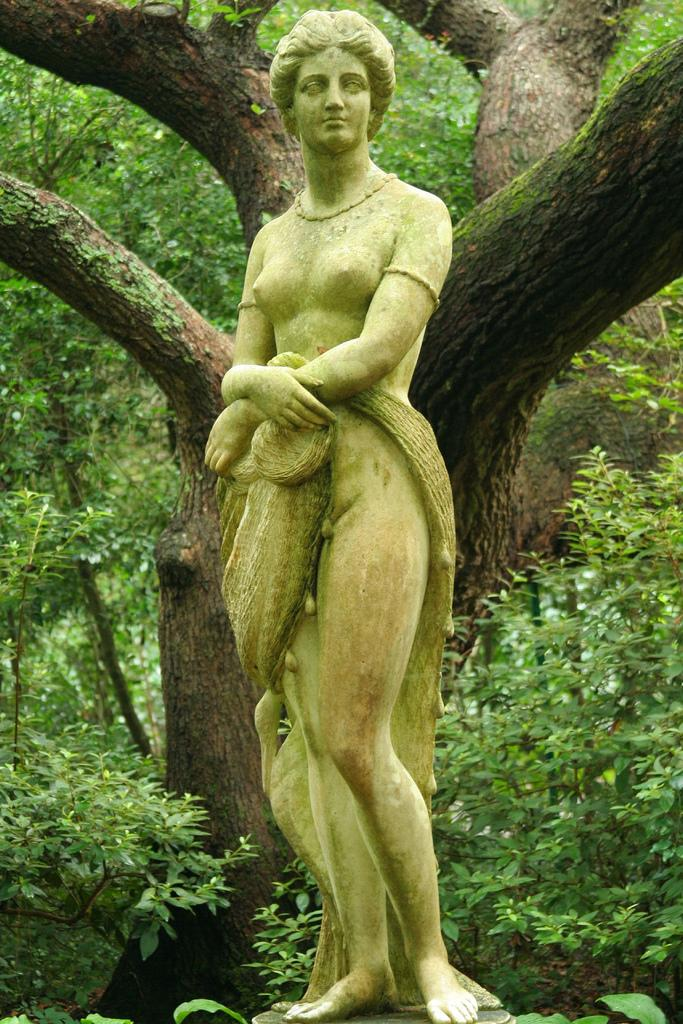
Virginia Dare by Maria Louisa Lander, 1859 in the Elizabethan Gardens in Manteo, NC. Imaginatively portrayed as an adult Indian princess.

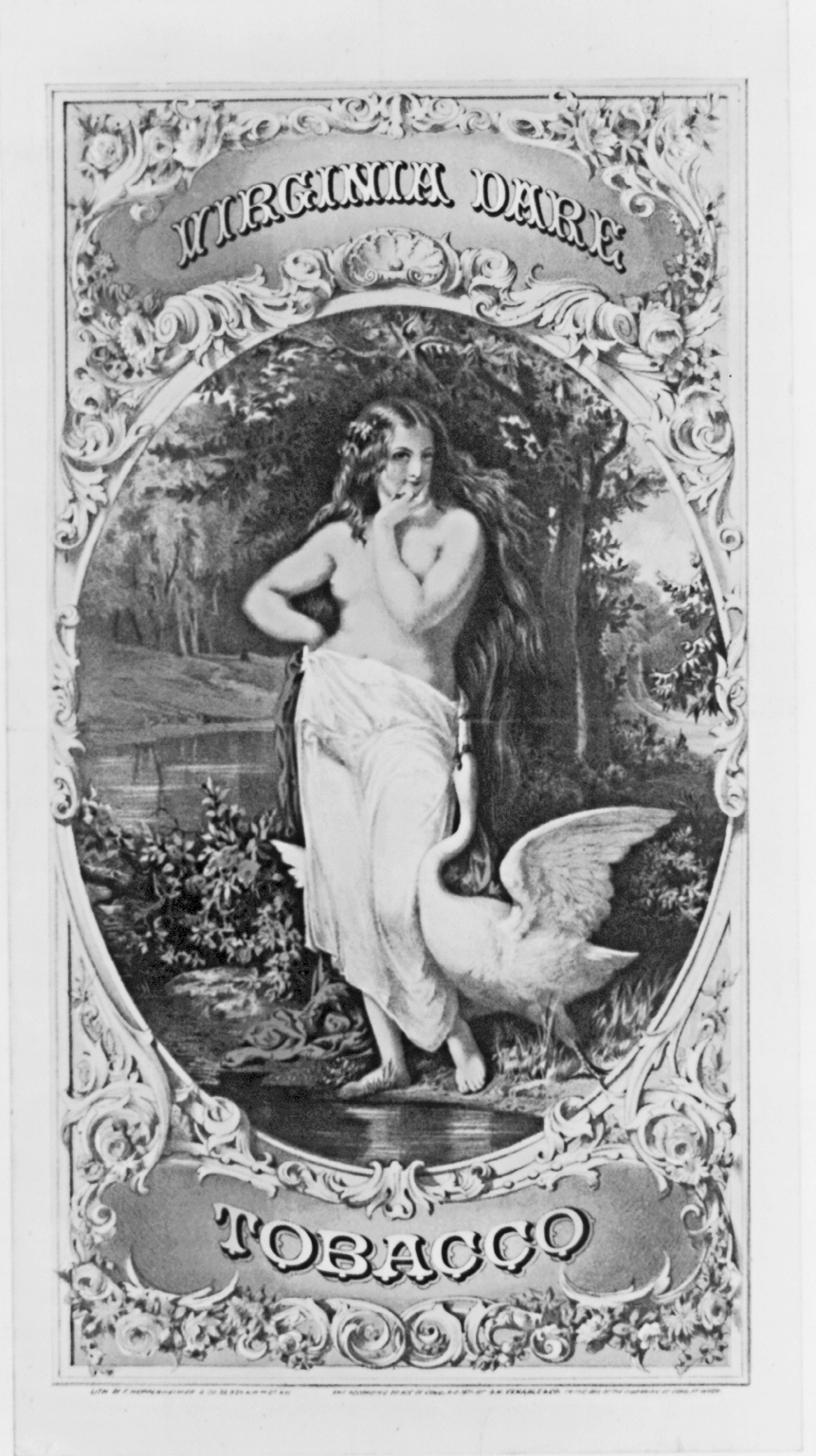
Virginia Dare Tobacco, label, circa 1871

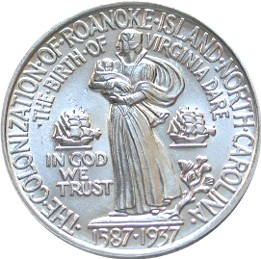
Reverse of a commemorative 1937 US half-dollar coin, depicting Eleanor and Virginia Dare

== See also ==
- First white child
- List of people who disappeared mysteriously (pre-1910)
- Martín de Argüelles, first white child born in modern U.S. (born 1566 in St. Augustine, Florida)
- Snorri Thorfinnsson, said to have been born between 1005 and 1013 in Vinland
- Peregrine White, first child born to the Pilgrims
- Sarah Rapelje, first white child born in New Netherlands in 1625.
