= Roger Giffard =

English physician

- Died: 1597
- Occupation: Physician

Roger Giffard (died 1597) was an English physician.

== Biography ==
Giffard was the son of Ralph Giffard of Steeple Claydon, Buckinghamshire, by his wife Mary, daughter of Sir Edward Chamberlain of Woodstock, Oxfordshire. He was educated at Merton College, Oxford, of which house he became a fellow, and took the degree of B.A. on 14 August 1556, proceeding M.A. on 15 February 1559–60 (Reg. of Univ. of Oxford, Oxford Hist. Soc. i. 232, 238, 321). On 8 April 1562 he was elected junior university proctor, and was re-elected on 21 April 1563 (Wood, Fasti Oxon. ed. Bliss. i. 160, 162). As a bachelor of medicine of 23 June 1563, ‘sometime fellow of Merton College, now or lately fellow of All Souls' College,’ he was, on 30 August 1566, created M.D. by Drs. Walter and Henry Baylie by virtue of a commission directed to them by the convocation, which had selected him to dispute before Elizabeth on her intended visit to the university in the ensuing September (ib. i. 176). Giffard was afterwards appointed physician to the queen. He was censor of the Royal College of Physicians from 1570 to 1572, consiliarius from 1585 to 1587, and again in 1591, and president from 1581 to 1584. He died on 27 Jan. 1596–7, and was buried in the parish of St. Bride, Fleet Street. His will, made on the day of his death, was not proved until 1 August 1597 (registered in P. C. C. 77, Cobham). Therein he bequeathed to Lord-keeper Sir Thomas Egerton ‘the Jewell wherein the Quenes maties picture is which he vsed to weare aboutes his necke.’ He possessed lands in the county of Durham and a lease of the farm of Tollesbury in Essex. By his wife Frances, who survived him, he had a son Thomas, a daughter Mary, another daughter married to Thomas Harries, and probably other children. Giffard was a man of wide culture, well read in French, Italian, and Flemish literature. He requested his executors to deliver to Merton College ‘suche of his bookes as Mr. Henry Savill should choose to be placed in the Librarye of the same Colledge for the vse of the ffellowes and Schollers of the same howse.’
