= Eleanor Dare =

English settler of the Roanoke Colony (c. 1568–1587)

- Born: Eleanor White c. 1568; London, England
- Disappeared: 1587–1590 (aged c. 19); Roanoke, America
- Known for: Member of the Lost Roanoke Colony
- Spouse: Ananias Dare
- Children: Virginia
- Parent: John White

Eleanor Dare (née White; c. 1568 – disappeared between 1587 and 1590) of Westminster, London, England, was a member of the English Roanoke Colony in North America and the daughter of John White, the colony's governor. While little is known about her life, more is known about her than most of the sixteen other women who left England in 1587 as part of the Roanoke expedition.

She married Ananias Dare. It is known that she gave birth to their daughter Virginia Dare on Roanoke Island, in what is now North Carolina. The girl was the first child of English parents to be born in North America, on 18 August 1587, shortly after their arrival. Eleanor Dare, along with everyone else remaining in the "Lost Colony", disappeared during the three years before her father returned to the colony with supplies from England.

== Roanoke colony ==
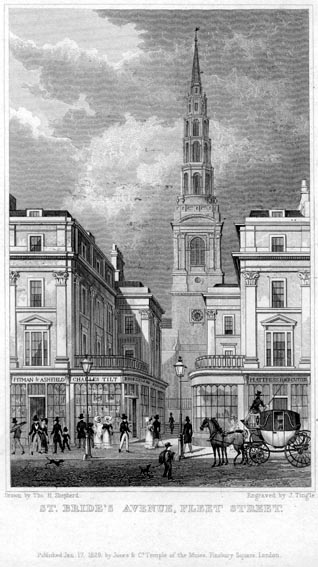
St Bride's Church, Fleet Street, London, where Eleanor Dare was married.

In her book Roanoke: Solving the Mystery of the Lost Colony (2000), anthropologist Lee Miller speculated that Eleanor and the other members of the Roanoke Colony were religious Separatists who left England at a time when the political climate in England was difficult for such religious dissidents. She suggested that this might be why the colonists, two of whom were pregnant women and several of whom were parents with young children, were willing to undertake the dangerous journey to Roanoke Island with low supplies and at a time when England was on the verge of war with Spain. The colonists, including the women, signed a petition urging White to return to England for supplies, even though he was reluctant to leave his daughter and granddaughter. Miller suggests that this democratic action would have been typical of a religious Separatist group.

=== Historical explanations ===
John Smith and other members of the Jamestown Colony sought information about the fate of the colonists in 1607. One report indicated that the Lost Colonists took refuge with the friendly Chesapeake, but Chief Powhatan claimed his tribe had attacked the group and killed most of the colonists. Powhatan showed Smith certain artifacts he said had belonged to the colonists, including a musket barrel and a brass mortar. The Jamestown Colony received reports of some survivors of the Lost Colony and sent out search parties, but none were successful. Eventually they determined that the early colonists had all died.

But, in her book Roanoke, Miller postulated that some of the Lost Colony survivors sought shelter with a neighboring tribe, the Chowanoc. This group was attacked by another tribe, identified by the Jamestown Colony as the "Mandoag." Miller thinks these were the Eno, also known as the Wainoke. Survivors were eventually sold into slavery and held captive by differing bands of the Eno tribe, who, Miller wrote, were known slave traders. Miller wrote that English settlers with the Jamestown Colony heard reports in 1609 of the captive Englishmen, but the reports were suppressed because they had no way to rescue the captives and didn't want to panic the Jamestown colonists.

William Strachey, a secretary of the Jamestown Colony, wrote in his The History of Travel Into Virginia Britania (1612) that, at the native settlements of Peccarecanick and Ochanahoen, there were reportedly two-story houses with stone walls, built in the English fashion. The natives supposedly learned how to build them from the Roanoke settlers. There were also reported sightings of European captives at various native settlements during the same time period. Strachey wrote in 1612 that four English men, two boys, and one girl had been sighted at the Eno settlement of Ritanoc, under the protection of a chief called Eyanoco. The captives were forced to beat copper. The captives, he reported, had escaped the attack on the other colonists and fled up the Choanoke river, the present-day Chowan River in Bertie County, North Carolina.

=== Possible descendants ===
The Chowanoc tribe was eventually absorbed into the Tuscarora. The Eno tribe was also associated with the Shakori tribe and was later absorbed by the Catawba or the Saponi tribes. From the early 17th century to the middle 18th century, European colonists reported encounters with gray-eyed Native Americans or with Welsh-speaking natives who claimed descent from the colonists. In 1669, a Welsh cleric named Morgan Jones was taken captive by the Tuscarora. He feared for his life, but a visiting Doeg war captain spoke to him in Welsh and assured him that he would not be killed. The Doeg warrior ransomed Jones and his party and Jones remained with their tribe for months as a preacher. In 1701, surveyor John Lawson encountered members of the Hatteras tribe living on Roanoke Island who claimed some of their ancestors were white people. Lawson wrote that several of the Hatteras tribesmen had gray eyes. Some present-day Native American tribes in North Carolina and South Carolina, among them the Coree and the Lumbee, also claim partial descent from surviving Roanoke colonists. A non-profit organization, the Lost Colony Center for Science and Research, has launched a Lost Colony DNA Project to test possible descendants.

== Eleanor Dare stones ==
From 1937 until 1941, the so-called "Dare Stones" were in the news. The carved stones were allegedly found in northern Georgia and the Carolinas. The first bore an announcement of the death of Eleanor's daughter, Virginia Dare and her husband, Ananias Dare, at the hands of "savages" in 1591. Successive stones describe Eleanor's eventual marriage to a Native American and her death. Most of the stones were exposed as forgeries in 1941, but some scholars believe that the first "Dare Stone" is authentic.

== See also ==
- List of colonists at Roanoke
- List of people who disappeared mysteriously: pre-1970
