= The Lost Book of Eleanor Dare =

2022 book

- Author: Kimberly Brock
- Genre: Alternate history
- Published: 2022
- Publisher: HarperCollins

The Lost Book of Eleanor Dare is an alternate history novel by Kimberly Brock.

== Plot summary ==
Alice Young, a distant descendant of Roanoke Colony's Eleanor Dare, has recently lost her husband in World War II and is about to sell the Dare estate. She brings her teenage daughter Penn to stay at the family's estate, named Evertell, before it is sold. There, she begins investigating the family's mysteries including the Dare Stones and a secret book left behind by Eleanor.

== Reception ==
The book received positive reviews from critics. Candice Dyer, in The Atlanta Journal-Constitution, wrote that "takes the Roanoke story’s loose ends and plaits them into an elegant, intricate braid, to muse on what *might* have happened if Eleanor Dare had survived and produced a long line of proud and plucky female descendants."

It was shortlisted for the Townsend Prize for Fiction in 2023.
