= Thetford ware =

Historic pottery style of Britain

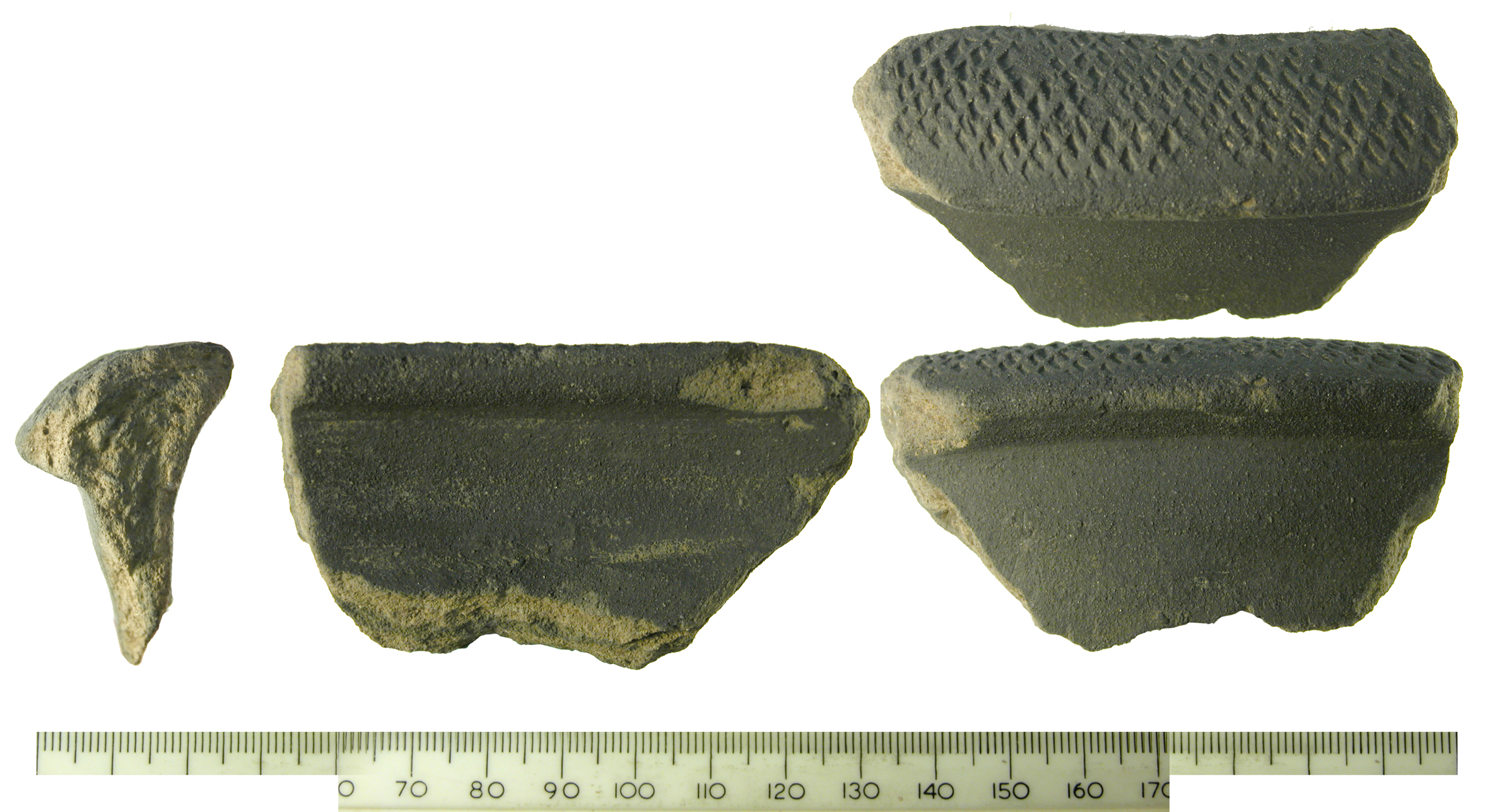
Thetford ware shards

Thetford ware is a type of English medieval pottery mass-produced in Britain between the late ninth and mid twelfth centuries AD. Manufactured in Norfolk and Ipswich, Suffolk, the pottery has a hard, sandy fabric, and is generally grey in colour. Most vessel types include cooking pots, bowls, jars, pitchers, and lamps.

== Description ==
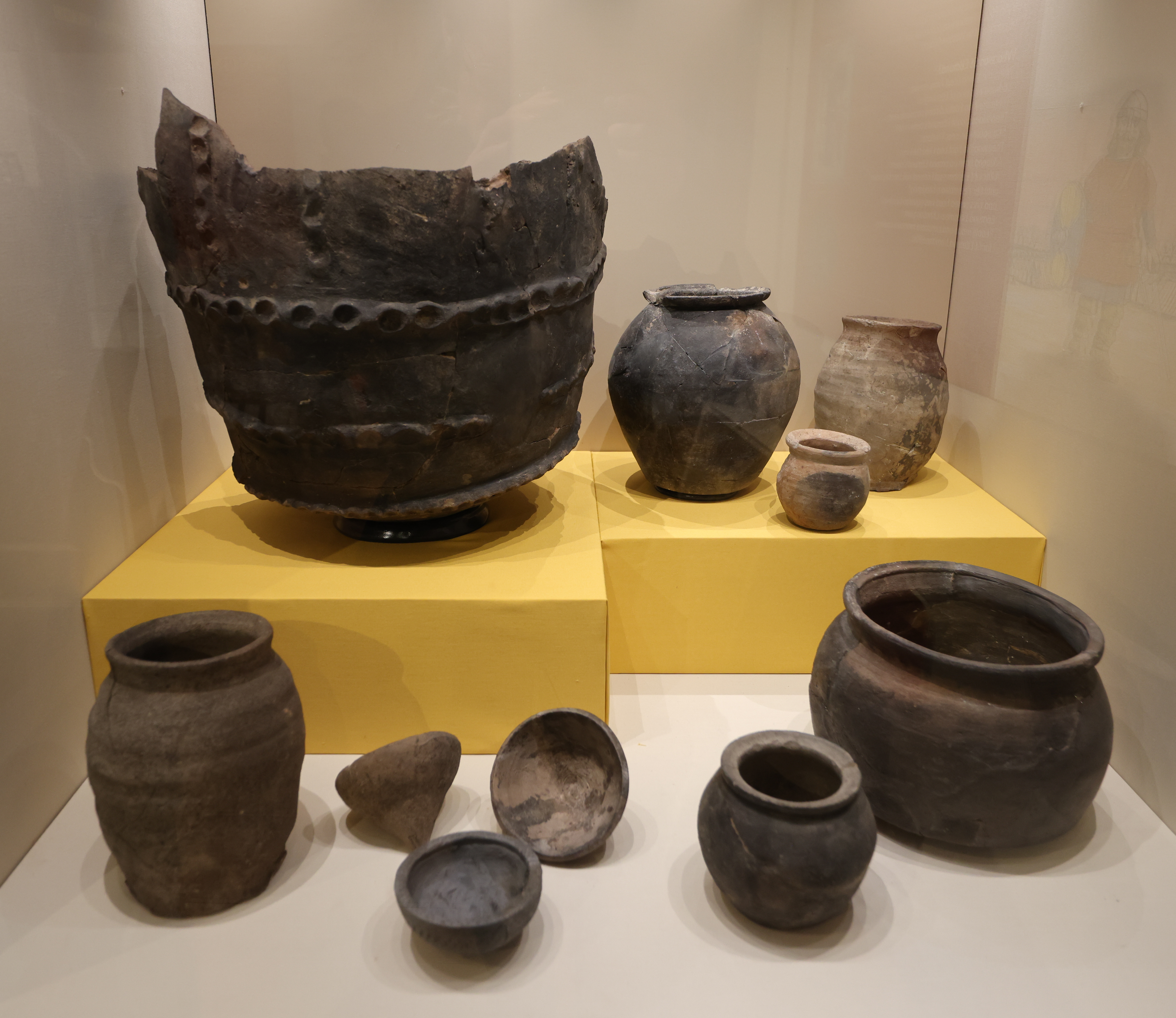
Examples of Thetford Ware at the Ancient House Museum Thetford

Thetford ware is a wheel-turned, mass-produced pottery having a hard, sandy fabric. Fabric colours vary from light to dark grey, and less frequently brownish-orange and buff. There are five types of forms manufactured: cooking pots, storage jars, bowls, pitchers and lamps. The cooking-pots were made in three sizes, with medium being the most commonly produced. The lamps were mostly a type of tall pedestal with hollow bases. Decoration was either unadorned or limited to applied-thumb strip decoration, several styles of rouletting, and incised bands. Rouletting is a process of carving patterns on pottery with a small toothed wheel. Rouletting decoration consisted of diamond and square shapes along with a mixture of diamonds and triangles.

== History ==
The pottery was named for the first Thetford ware discovered in the village of Thetford, Norfolk. Archaeologists have determined that the first Thetford-type ware manufactured was in the village of Ipswich, Suffolk around 850 AD. Thetford potters first produced the wares around 925 AD. The pottery was produced and distributed throughout East Anglia from the late ninth though the mid twelfth centuries AD. Along with Thetford and Ipswich, the pottery was produced in Norwich, Bircham, Grimston, and Langhale, all in Norfolk. The pottery can be found throughout eastern England, as far south as London and as far north as Lincolnshire. Thetford ware has been discovered outside of Britain, in Scandinavia.

== See also ==
- Ipswich ware
- List of English medieval pottery
