= Roanoke: Solving the Mystery of the Lost Colony =

- Author: Lee Miller
- Genre: Non-fiction
- Publisher: Scholastic Books
- Publication place: United States

Roanoke: Solving the Mystery of the Lost Colony is a children's history book by Lee Miller. The book covers the mystery of Roanoke Colony. It was published by Scholastic Books.

== Reception ==
The book received mostly positive reviews from critics. Elizabeth Bush, in a review for Bulletin of the Center for Children's Books, writes that "Miller presents an argument that goes well beyond mere plausibility and, even more important for middle-school readers, a story that is clearly told and rife with suffering underdogs and villains in high places."
