= The Alchemyst: The Secrets of the Immortal Nicholas Flamel =

2007 fantasy novel by Michael Scott

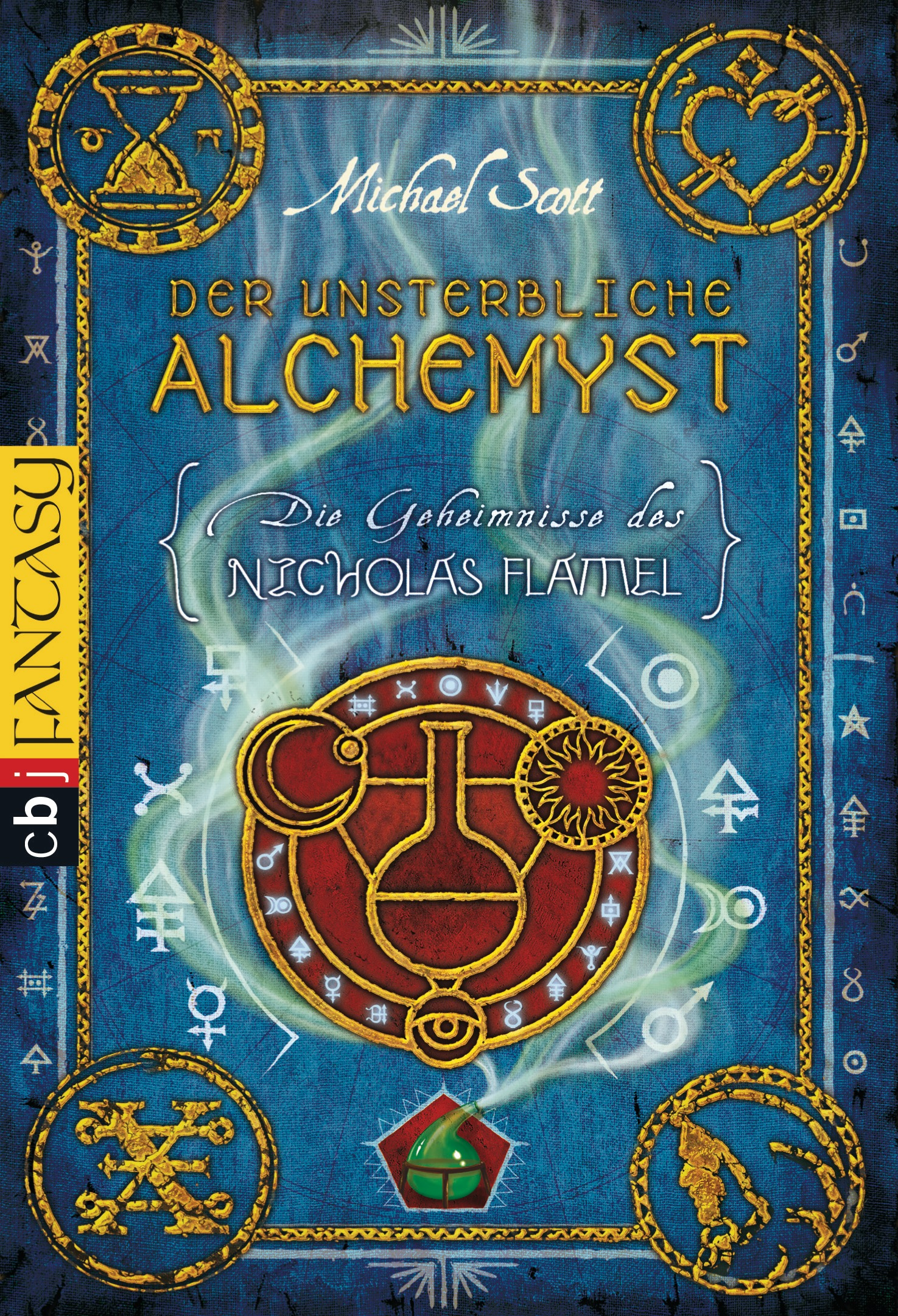
- German cover
- Author: Michael Scott
- Cover artist: Michael Wagner
- Language: English
- Series: The Secrets of the Immortal Nicholas Flamel
- Genre: Fantasy
- Publisher: Delacorte Press (US); Doubleday (UK)
- Publication date: 22 May 2007 (US); 24 May 2007 (UK)
- Publication place: United States
- Media type: Print (hardcover)
- Pages: 375
- ISBN: 978-0-385-73357-1 (US); 978-0-385-61293-7 (UK)
- Dewey Decimal: 823.914
- LC Class: PZ7.S42736Alc 2007
- Followed by: The Magician

The Alchemyst: The Secrets of the Immortal Nicholas Flamel (often shortened to The Alchemyst) is the first installment in the six volume fantasy novel series, The Secrets of the Immortal Nicholas Flamel. It was written by Irish author Michael Scott and published in May 2007. The Alchemyst has been translated into 20 languages, and is available in 37 countries.

== Title character ==
The "Alchemyst" refers to the historical character of Nicolas Flamel, a French scrivener and manuscript seller, although being referred to as "Nicholas Flamel" with an "h" in the name in the series. Flamel developed a posthumous reputation for being an alchemist and for his search for the philosopher's stone and immortality.

"The Alchemyst is Nicholas Flamel."

— Michael Scott

== Plot summary ==
Sophie and Josh Newman are 15-year-old twins who are working at their summer jobs in The Coffee Cup in San Francisco (Sophie works at The Coffee Cup, Josh works at the bookstore on the other side of the street) when a mysterious man, John Dee, comes into the bookstore for a book, the Codex – or Book of Abraham the Mage. Josh witnesses his employer, Nick, and Nick's wife Perry both using magic. He discovers that Nick is not an ordinary bookseller, but is the medieval and the legendary alchemist, Nicholas Flamel, being kept alive by making the elixir of life (a secret from the Codex) for him and his wife, Perenelle. Dee also uses magic and takes the Codex by force while Josh is holding it – resulting in two pages being left behind; "The Final Summoning" pages that Dee needs to raise the Dark Elders, the beings whom Dee serves, and who have kept him immortal for several hundred years. Both Flamels need the Codex to make the elixir of life, or they will age rapidly and die within a month. Also, if they do not retrieve the Codex, Dee will summon the Dark Elders to destroy the world and return to an age in which humans are but slaves and food.

Flamel quickly takes Sophie and Josh to a hideout to enlist the aid of Scathach, a powerful Next Generation Elder. There, they are forced to run, threatened by rats sent by Dee, which is thwarted by Flamel and Scathach. Chased again almost immediately by tens of thousands of birds, Flamel then leads the twins and Scathach to secure the aid of Hekate, a powerful three-faced Elder, who can awaken the twins' magical potential. Dee discovers this, and enlists the aid of Bastet and the Morrigan. The trio mount a massive assault on Hekate's shadowrealm, to destroy Yggdrasill – the world tree – that is the heart of Hekate's power.

While Yggdrasill is attacked, Hekate awakens Sophie's magic abilities but does not have time to awaken Josh, as the tree has been set on fire by Dee. While she rushes to defend her home, Scathach, Flamel, and the twins attempt to escape the shadowrealm. While escaping, they encounter Dee and witness the power of the ancient Ice Elemental sword, Excalibur. They see Dee transform a wereboar into pure ice, then shatter the statue. Scathach remarks that she thought that Excalibur had been lost when Artorius died.

The twins, Scathach, and Flamel escape the shadowrealm, shortly before the destruction of Hekate, Yggdrasill, and the entire shadowrealm. As they escape, Dee uses Excalibur to freeze the tree, and Hekate, whose life and power is linked to it, transforms to ice as well. As this occurs, Dee is informed that the Flamels and Scathach have escaped with the twins. In his rage, he shatters Yggdrasill, which crushes Hekate into dust, killing her. Flamel, Scathach, and the twins travel to Scathach's grandmother, the Witch of Endor (also called "The Mistress of Air"), who teaches Sophie her magical secrets quickly by giving the girl all the witch's knowledge and the power to know how to use air magic.

While they are there, Dee has found out that a prophecy in the Codex speaks of Sophie and Josh. He tempts Josh to join him while using necromancy to raise thousands of corpses to assault the Elders, Flamel, and Sophie. Josh almost agrees, but at the last moment, he realizes he will lose Sophie if he agrees. Dee brings all the dead in a nearby cemetery alive and they start to attack them, Josh hits Dee with their Hummer, distracting Dee long enough to escape with Scathach, Sophie and Nicholas Flamel by using a leygate (a teleportation device where two or more lines of energy, ley lines, cross each other) to go to Paris which is Nicholas Flamel's old home. The book ends when Dee surprises them.

== Special editions and cover variations ==
On 5 August 2010 in the UK, The Alchemyst, was re-released featuring an alternate cover.

The Alchemyst was released as part of a special edition boxed 3 book set called The First Codex in the US on 28 September 2020.

== Audio book ==
The Alchemyst is also available as an unabridged audiobook. It was released by the Listening Library on 22 May 2007 and narrated by Denis O'Hare. The audiobook ISBN numbers are: ISBN 0-7393-5032-3 (UK), ISBN 978-0-7393-5032-4 (US).

== Award nominations ==
- Irish Book of the Year – 2008
- Kentucky Bluegrass Book Award
- Rhode Island Teen Book Award – 2008 (Winner)
- Bisto Book of the Year Award – 2008
- CBI Shadowing Award – 2008
- Maine Student Book Award – ranked 10th
- Nevada Young Readers Award
- NCSLMA YA Book Award – 2010

== Online games ==
The first related online game to be launched was The Codex Master. The object is to get money and guess a secret code composed of a sequence of coloured orbs by inputting various sequences and using logic. When a sequence is entered, indicators show when the player has the right colour and also when a colour is in the right or wrong position to enable them to apply logic and guess the correct sequence.

== Film adaptation ==
Film rights for the book were originally sold to New Line Cinema and Mark Burnett Productions in 2006. Eric Bress was confirmed as the writer in 2007.

In November 2009 it was announced that Lorenzo di Bonaventura had bought the film rights to the series. Michael Scott and Barry Krost were set to be the executive producers, with the script writer being unannounced.

"Well, I have been promising news of the Flamel movie. Here's the press release. The movie was set up with New Line, but New Line were absorbed by Warner and the rights reverted to me. There has been tremendous interest in the series and eventually, it went to Lorenzo di Bonaventura, who is the man responsible for bringing Harry Potter to Warner when he was there. He genuinely loves this series. The next step now is to attach a writer - I will not write it, I have 3 more books to do!"

— Michael Scott

On 20 June 2012 it was announced that the Australian company AMPCO Films had optioned the film. Michael Scott would write the screenplay. Production was due to start in early 2013 and filming would take place in Australia and New Zealand. Dick Cook Studios had boarded the production of the film by October 2019 with expectations that the film would start production as its second project in early 2021.

== Sequels ==
The series continues in the sequel The Magician: The Secrets of the Immortal Nicholas Flamel which was released in the UK on 5 June 2008 and on 24 June 2008 in the US. The third book The Sorceress: The Secrets of the Immortal Nicholas Flamel was released on 26 May 2009 in the US and the fourth book was released on 25 June 2009 in the UK The Necromancer: The Secrets of the Immortal Nicholas Flamel followed with its US release on 25 May 2010. The fifth book, The Warlock: The Secrets of the Immortal Nicholas Flamel was released on 24 May 2011 in America. The final book in the series,The Enchantress: The Secrets of the Immortal Nicholas Flamel, was released 24 May 2012.
