= The Warlock: The Secrets of the Immortal Nicholas Flamel =

Novel by Michael Scott

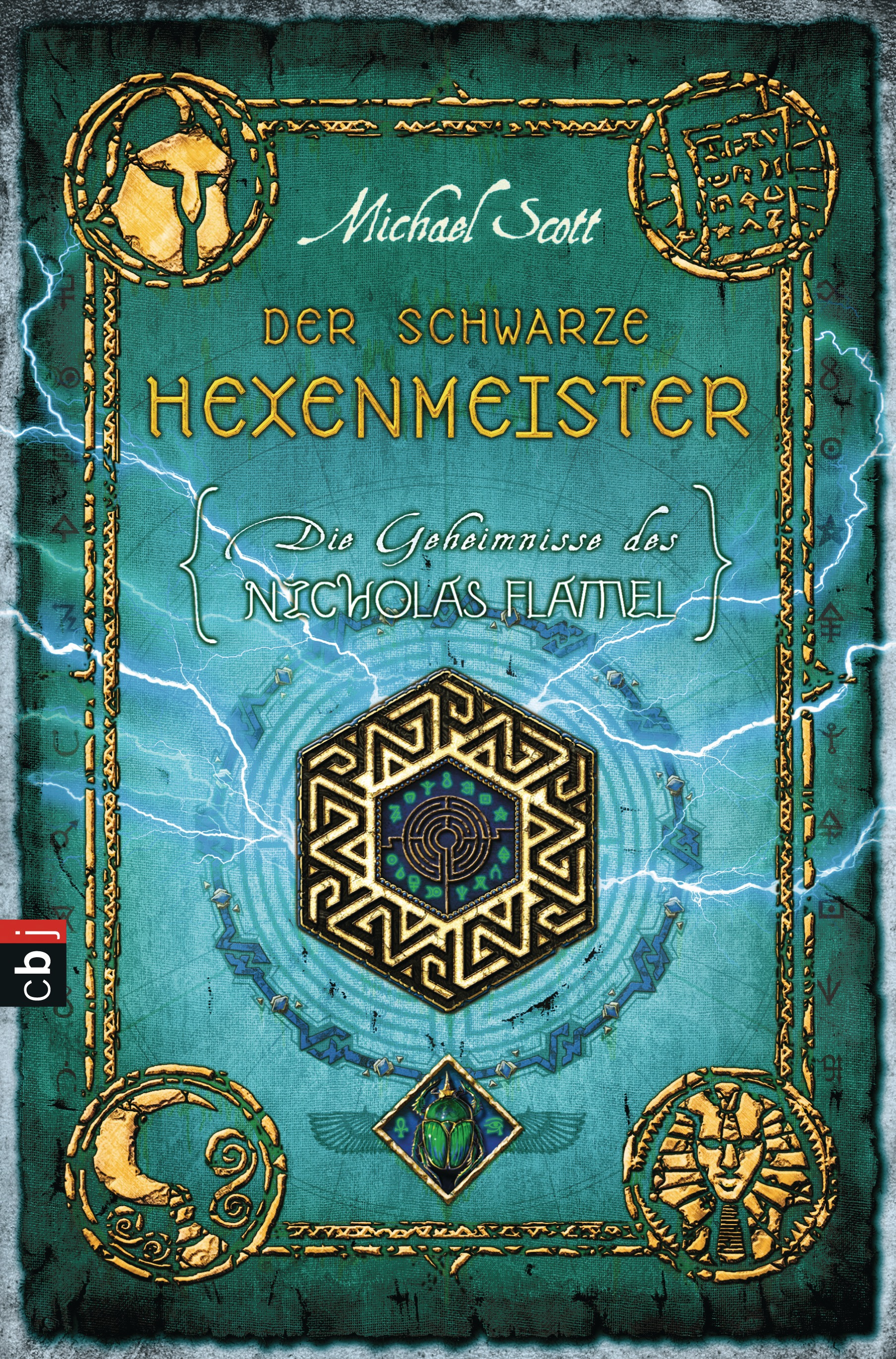
- German cover
- Author: Michael Scott
- Cover artist: Michael Wagner
- Language: English
- Series: The Secrets of the Immortal Nicholas Flamel
- Genre: Fantasy
- Publisher: Random House
- Publication date: 24 May 2011 (US); 2 June 2011 (UK)
- Publication place: United States
- Media type: Print (hardcover)
- Pages: 400
- ISBN: 978-0-385-73533-9
- Dewey Decimal: 823.92
- LC Class: PZ7.S42736War 2011
- Preceded by: The Necromancer
- Followed by: The Enchantress

The Warlock: The Secrets of the Immortal Nicholas Flamel (often shortened to The Warlock) is the fifth book of the series The Secrets of the Immortal Nicholas Flamel written by Irish author Michael Scott. The novel was released in the United States on May 24, 2011, published by Delacorte Press, which is an imprint of Random House. The United Kingdom release date was June 2, 2011, and it made its debut on the USA Today Best Selling List at #13 on the same day.

It is preceded by four other titles (in order of release): The Alchemyst, The Magician, The Sorceress, and The Necromancer, and was followed by the release of The Enchantress. The Warlock in question is Aten, Machiavelli, or Billy the Kid.

== Plot summary ==
At the end of The Necromancer, twins Sophie and Josh Newman were separated. Sophie was left with the now very weak protagonist Nicholas Flamel, his wife Perenelle Flamel, and immortal Japanese swordsman Niten, while Josh exited with the main antagonist Dr. John Dee, and his accomplice Virginia Dare. Mars Ultor, the Avenger, sees Sophie, accompanied by Niten, seeking a way to reclaim her brother. Nicholas Flamel is unable to help her in the search as he lapses into unconsciousness after the battle against Dr. Dee, Virginia Dare, and the Archon, Coatlicue. Perenelle and Prometheus escape from Hades, Prometheus's long-drawn-out punishment shadowrealm, which crumbles into nothing, because Prometheus uses most of his aura to feed the crystal skull.

Meanwhile, in the Catacombs underneath Paris the previously imprisoned and very powerful Elder, Mars Ultor has a conversation with his wife, the Witch of Endor, and the Egyptian Elders: Isis and Osiris. The witch has come there to free him while Isis and Osiris are hunting down Dr. John Dee. In San Francisco, Niten leads Sophie to Tsagaglalal, She Who Watches, who is in reality Sophie's Aunt Agnes. Perenelle, Nicholas, and Prometheus join them shortly. Nicholas is set to die within the day and Perenelle two days later, but the mysterious Hook-Handed Man told Perenelle long ago that she could give her husband one more day of life in exchange for one of her own. Through a ritual that requires Tsagaglalal and Sophie's auras, Perenelle can keep Nicholas alive for another day as well as awaken him from his coma.

In Danu Talis, Scathach, Saint Germain, Palamedes, Shakespeare, and Joan of Arc are captured and sent to a volcano prison. Marethyu is captured and taken to the ruler of Danu Talis, Aten. Aten is facing betrayal from his brother, Anubis, and mother Bastet. He fears the destruction of Danu Talis but also reaches an epiphany that if Danu Talis is not brought down, future civilizations will never be created. He asks the Hook-Handed Man for advice. Marethyu advises that Aten become an oath breaker, or a warlock, and turn the city over to Marethyu. He agrees but Anubis arrives to arrest Aten. Aten allows himself to be captured to let Marethyu escape in a crystal vimana (flying saucer).

In the present, Odin, Hel, Black Hawk, and Mars Ultor arrive at Tsagaglalal's home to seek her wisdom. Tsagaglalal then gives everyone emerald tablets that Abraham the Mage (her husband) wrote personally for them. Mars, Hel, and Odin then go to Alcatraz to kill Dee. Nicholas, Perenelle, Niten, and Prometheus go to the Embarcadero to stop the Lotan, a seven-headed sea monster released by Dee with the help of the Elder, Nereus. Sophie spends time with Tsagaglalal who teaches her the Magic of Earth. To her surprise, however, Sophie is taught that all magic is one; there is no true division, it is just pure imagination. Tsagagalal takes Sophie to reunite with Josh at Alcatraz.

While spending time together on Alcatraz, Machiavelli bonds with Billy the Kid and they decide to break the oaths made to their elder masters, becoming warlocks. This angers Dee, who nearly allows the Sphinx to kill Billy, but he is stopped by Dare, who knows Billy from years past. Under the influence of Dee and the sword Clarent, Josh helps Dee release the wild and dangerous beasts being kept in the prison as a part of Dee's newest and most desperate scheme—he not only wants to destroy the Elders and rebuild the Earth but also claim the other shadow realms and Danu Talis. Sophie reaches Alcatraz by Leygate through her jade tablet and refuses to leave Josh.

== Characters new to the series ==
- Anubis – Brother of Aten, seeking to rule Danu Talis as his own.
- Aten – One of the last rulers of Danu Talis. Brother of Anubis. Machiavelli's master.
- Hel – Odin's niece, seeking revenge on Dr Dee.
- Isis – Goddess worshipped by the Ancient Egyptians as the goddess of magic. Revealed as Sophie and Josh Newman's mother and one of Dee's masters.
- Osiris – God worshipped by the Ancient Egyptians as the god of the dead. Revealed as Sophie and Josh Newman's father and one of Dee's masters.
- Tsagaglalal – "She Who Watches", previously appeared in the series as Aunt Agnes. Gilgamesh's sister. Abraham's wife.

== Awards ==
The Warlock was awarded a Silver Honour in the Parent's Choice Fiction Awards 2012.

== Sequel ==
The Warlock is followed by the concluding installment to the series, The Enchantress.

== Other editions ==
The Warlock was released on 2 June 2011 in the UK with a different cover.

The Warlock audio book is narrated by Paul Boehmer.
