= Flamel (disambiguation) =

Flamel may refer to:

== People ==
- Nicolas Flamel (1340-1418) reputed to be an alchemist who concocted the philosopher's stone
- Perenelle Flamel (died 1397) reputed to be an alchemist, wife of Nicolas

== Places ==
- House of Nicolas Flamel, a building that Nicolas Flamel once lived in, now a restaurant still a private home
- Rue Nicolas Flamel, a street in Paris, France, which contains the House of Nicolas Flamel

== Other uses ==
- Nicolas Flamel (Harry Potter), a fictionalized version of Nicolas Flamel
- Perenelle Flamel (Harry Potter), a fictionalized version of Perenelle Flamel
- Flamel Technologies, a French pharma company
