= The Magician: The Secrets of the Immortal Nicholas Flamel =

2008 fantasy novel by Michael Scott

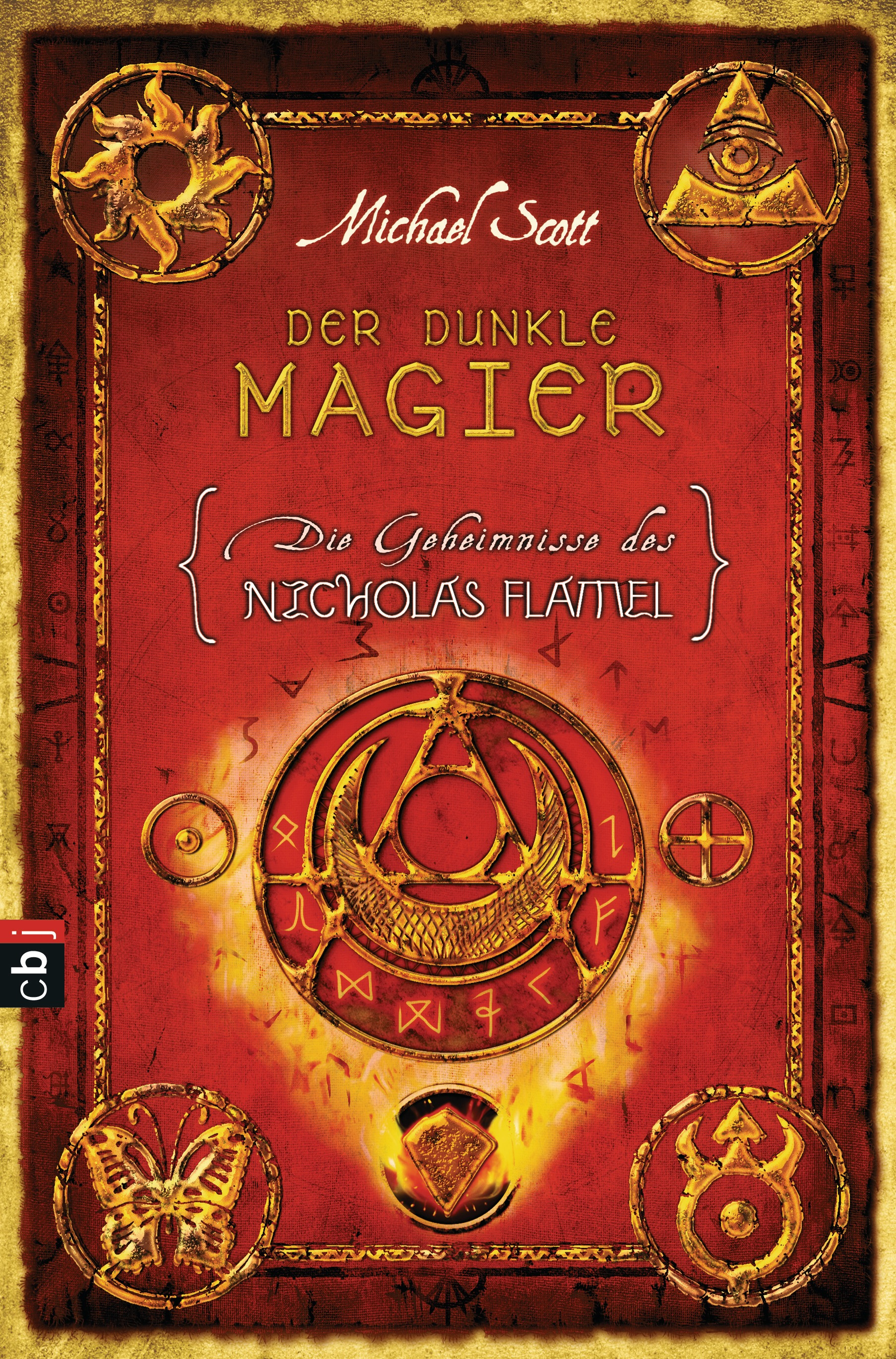
- German cover
- Author: Michael Scott
- Cover artist: Michael Wagner
- Language: English
- Series: The Secrets of the Immortal Nicholas Flamel
- Genre: Fantasy
- Publisher: Doubleday (UK); Delacorte Press (US)
- Publication date: 5 June 2008 (UK); 24 June 2008 (US)
- Publication place: United Kingdom
- Media type: Print (hardcover)
- Pages: 461
- ISBN: 978-0-385-73358-8
- Dewey Decimal: 823.914
- LC Class: PZ7.S42736Mag 2008
- Preceded by: The Alchemyst
- Followed by: The Sorceress

The Magician: The Secrets of the Immortal Nicholas Flamel (often shortened to The Magician) is a fantasy novel by Michael Scott. It is the sequel to The Alchemyst, and the second installment in the six part book series, The Secrets of the Immortal Nicholas Flamel. It was released on 5 June 2008 in the United Kingdom, and 24 June 2008 in the United States. It was nominated for an Irish Book of the Year Award, The Dublin Airport Authority Irish Children's Book of the Year – Senior Category.

== Title character ==
The book's title, The Magician, refers to the villain, John Dee, who works for the Dark Elders and for their return to dominance on Earth.

"Dee had so many talents, he could have been any of the characters – indeed, I have written elsewhere that he was the original hero of this series. He was The Alchemyst of the title. In his own time, he was always principally known as 'The Magician.'"

— Michael Scott,

== Plot summary ==
Sophie and Josh Newman – 15-year-old twins – are in Paris with the alchemyst, Nicholas Flamel, and his friend, Scathach. They now face Niccolò Machiavelli and his colleague, but also rival, John Dee, who both work for the Dark Elders. Machiavelli is plotting to capture the twins and Flamel with the missing pages of the Codex – or Book of Abraham the Mage – before Dee can arrive in France from San Francisco. The twins seek out a friend and student to Nicholas, Comte de Saint-Germain, who teaches Sophie to use the elemental magic of Fire. Saint-Germain's wife, Joan of Arc, helps Sophie to learn to control her aura and to sort out the Witch of Endor's memories from her own. Josh is given the legendary stone sword Clarent, twin blade of Excalibur, by Nicholas. Clarent is an ancient Fire Elemental sword. Josh, Joan, and Scathach encounter three Disir, more commonly referred to as Valkyries. The Disir are ancient enemies of Scathach and bring along the soul-devouring Nidhogg, a ferocious monster once trapped in the roots of Yggdrasil – the world tree. The monster was freed after Dee destroyed Yggdrasil and attacks Scathach but fails to slay her. Instead, it captures Scathach in its claws, but flees with Scathach when the ancient sword Clarent, wielded by Josh, wounds it. Meanwhile, Nicholas' wife, Perenelle Flamel, who had been captured, is taken to Alcatraz as a prisoner.

On Alcatraz, Perenelle is helped by the ghost of Juan Manuel de Ayala, a Spanish sailor. She explores Alcatraz and finds ancient monsters in cells. She gets attacked by the Morrigan because Dee has authorized her to be killed. Underground, Perenelle meets Areop-Enap, the spider elder. The elder explains that Dee could not have Areop-Enap killed because other elders would investigate. Together, the two incapacitate the Morrigan and her thousands of crows that accompanied her.

Sophie, Joan, and Nicholas decide to go after Josh and, by using Sophie's aura, they track Dee and his comrades to the catacombs of Paris. There, Josh's magical ability is awakened by Mars Ultor and he is given a special "gift" similar to what Sophie received from the Witch of Endor – Josh now has Mars' military knowledge. When Sophie, Josh, and the rest escape from the catacombs, Dee and Machiavelli have set a trap, making the gargoyles and statues of Paris come to life and attack. Josh, Sophie, Saint-Germain, and Joan of Arc combine powers to destroy the statues. Flamel and the twins escape via a train and head for London. Perenelle is still stuck on Alcatraz and fears recapture.

== Characters new to the series ==
- Niccolò Machiavelli – An Italian immortal who tries to retrieve the missing pages of the Codex alongside Dee. He is the head of the French secret service and is described as infinitely more cunning and dangerous than Dee. His aura is grayish-white and smells like snakes.
- Comte de Saint-Germain – A former apprentice to Nicholas Flamel. He is immortal. Saint-Germain is a master of the Magic of Fire and taught that magic to Sophie. He is a well known rock star. His aura is red and smells of burnt leaves. He is married to the immortal, Joan of Arc, in this series.
- Joan of Arc – The Maid of Orléans aka Jeanne d'Arc. Very good friends with Scathach after being saved from near-death at her "execution". Joan became immortal after receiving a blood transfusion from the vampire Scathach. Joan was tutored in fighting by Scathach. Joan taught Sophie how to sort through and organise the Witch of Endor's foreign memories, as well as how to shape her aura. Joan's aura is pure silver like Sophie's and smells like lavender.
- Areop-Enap – A Spider-like Elder, who was imprisoned deep in Alcatraz by Dee, before being set free by Perenelle.
- Juan Manuel de Ayala – A Spanish sailor's ghost, who had discovered and named Alcatraz Island. He is now its guardian and helped Perenelle escape her prison cell by slamming cell doors and other noises, distracting the Sphinx, which is able to absorb magical auras thus keeping Perenelle weak.
- Dagon – A fish-like creature from before the Elders. The rest of his race were destroyed by Scathach. He is Machiavelli's manservant and friend and was last seen dragging an unconscious Scathach into the Seine, set on revenge.
- Mars Ultor – Mars the Avenger. Lives in the catacombs of Paris. Awakened Josh and gives him a gift. Josh is unaware of what it is. His aura, which is red-violet, was solidified by the Witch of Endor and is now like a stone coating.

"Directly in front of him, close enough to touch, was the Elder the Romans had worshipped as the God of War. Josh had never heard of Hekate or the Witch of Endor, and because he knew nothing about them, they hadn't had the same effect on him. This Elder was different. Now he knew what Dee had meant when he said that this was the Elder remembered by humankind. This was Mars himself, the Elder with a month and a planet named after him"

— Michael Scott, The Magician

- Nidhogg – aka "The devourer of corpses". A giant monster with a ravenous hunger for flesh. It was released from its prison in the roots of the world tree, Yggdrasill, when Dee killed both Hekate & the tree. It then leaves a swathe of damage through Paris as it runs amok, until it plunges into the Seine whilst trying to escape attacks from Josh using the magical sword, Clarent.
- Disir – aka the Valkyries, the Shieldmaidens, the Choosers of the Dead. The Disir are a trio of immortal warrior women sent to hunt after Flamel and his group. They make a deal with Machiavelli that they may claim and kill Scathach (who is their mortal enemy) if they can catch her while Machiavelli and Dee continue their hunt for Nicholas Flamel, the last pages of the Codex and the twins.

== Special editions and cover variations ==
On 5 August 2010 in the UK The Magician was re-released featuring a new style cover.

The Magician was also released as part of a special edition boxed 3 book set called The First Codex in the US on 28 September 2010. It consists of three books.

== Audiobook ==
The Magician is available as an unabridged audiobook. It was released by the Listening Library on 24 June 2008 and narrated by Erik Singer. The audiobook ISBN numbers are: ISBN 0-7393-6491-X (U.K), ISBN 978-0739364918(U.S.A).

== Award nomination ==
- 2009 Irish Book of the Year Award – The Dublin Airport Authority Irish Children's Book of the Year – Snr Category.

== Sequel ==
The sequel to this book, The Sorceress was released on 26 May 2009 in the US and in June 2009 in the UK.
