= The Enchantress: The Secrets of the Immortal Nicholas Flamel =

Novel by Michael Scott

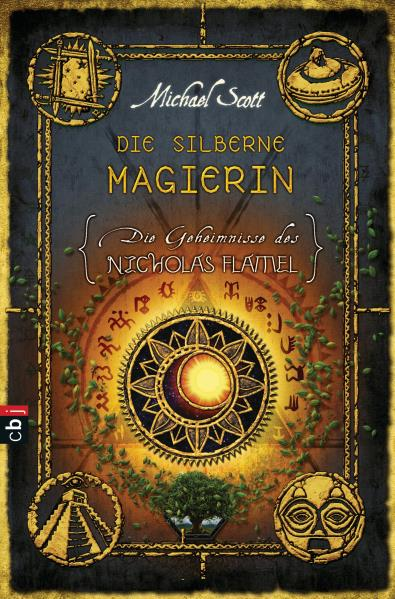
- German cover
- Author: Michael Scott
- Cover artist: Michael Wagner
- Language: English
- Series: The Secrets of the Immortal Nicholas Flamel
- Genre: Fantasy
- Published: 22 May 2012 Random House (U.S.); 24 May 2012 Random House (UK)
- Publication place: United States
- Media type: Print (hardcover)
- Pages: 416 (U.S. hardcover)
- ISBN: 978-0-385-73535-3 (U.S.), ISBN 978-0-385-61900-4 (UK)
- Preceded by: The Warlock

The Enchantress: The Secrets of the Immortal Nicolas Flamel (often shortened to The Enchantress) is the final novel in the six book series, The Secrets of the Immortal Nicholas Flamel. It was written by Irish author Michael Scott and was published by Random House Inc. on 22 May 2012 in the US, and by Doubleday Publishing an imprint of Random House UK on 24 May 2012 in the UK and Ireland.

The series has been printed in 20 languages and is available in 37 countries, and features in the Top Ten on the New York Times Children's Best Selling Series list. The film rights to the series have been sold to Lorenzo di Bonaventura.

== Title character ==
In an interview with Voya Magazine, Michael Scott named The Enchantress as Sophie Newman.

== Plot summary ==
After the events of The Warlock, the twins Sophie and Josh Newman, along with John Dee and Virginia Dare, go back in time to the Isle of Danu Talis, where Osiris and Isis are revealed to be Dee's masters and the twins' parents. Osiris removes Dee's immortality, but Dee does not immediately die (he is later found by Marethyu, who restores his health and sight). Virginia Dare chooses to side with Osiris and Isis.

Meanwhile, Nicholas and Perenelle Flamel, Niten, and Prometheus discover that Mars, Hel, and Odin are not faring well against the monsters on Alcatraz, and that Machiavelli and Billy the Kid have joined them. After successfully turning the monsters on each other, the Flamels join them on Alcatraz. But Billy mistakenly throws the spear heads with the Words of Power at Perenelle (he also used them to kill the Sphinx earlier). The Morrigan throws herself in front of Perenelle and dies instead. Odin and Hel both die slaying an army of Anpu. After finding Aerop-Enap's cocoon, the Flamels and Machiavelli attempt to awake her while Billy and Black Hawk fight a Karkinos (giant crab). Billy is severely wounded and Black Hawk is thrown into the water, presumably eaten by the Nereids. Machiavelli heals Billy and Aerop-Enap kills the Karkinos. Tsagaglalal returns herself to her youthful immortal state and it is discovered that she is one of the First People that were awakened by Prometheus. After putting on an ancient suit of ceramic armour, she goes to the Golden Gate Bridge to fend off an army of Spartoi that were animated by Quetzalcoatl and Bastet. Vowing to keep them from entering the city, Niten and Prometheus defeat quite a few of the Spartoi, but both are killed. After slaying the rest of the Spartoi, Tsagaglalal finds them, but only has enough of her aura left to heal Prometheus. The Elder convinces her to use her aura to heal Niten, asking her to tell him to marry Aoife, whom Niten loves. Quetzalcoatl and Bastet flee after they hear Tsagaglalal roar out of rage.

On Danu Talis, Scathach, Joan of Arc, Saint-Germain, Palamedes, Shakespeare, and the young Prometheus crash their vimana on the original Yggdrasill and meet Hekate and Mars (then Huitzilopochtli), who plan to lead the human inhabitants of the Yggdrasill to liberate the incarcerated Aten. Anubis and his mother Bastet prepare to take over Danu Talis by making Anubis ruler, but Isis and Osiris have other plans. Telling Sophie and Josh to put on silver and gold suits of armour, they prepare to present the twins to the council of elders as the rightful rulers of Danu Talis. Marethyu presents Dare with a tablet containing personal messages, and it convinces her to side with the humani. Marethyu then proceeds to watch Josh and Sophie enter the pyramid because he knows that it will be the last time they get to laugh with one another. While Josh and Sophie wait to be presented, they are attacked by berserkers (bear hybrids), and Tsagaglalal (She Who Watches) comes to the rescue. Dare meets Dee in front of the prison, later telling him that she had only wanted a world so that she could make it completely free. She leads the humani against the Elders along with Dee, who dies when allowing her to draw energy off of his aura so she can save the humans from the warden's counter-attack.

Scathach, Joan, Saint Germain, Shakespeare, and Palamedes fight the final battle along with the twins. Osiris and Isis admit that Sophie and Josh aren't their children (Josh was found in a Neanderthal camp shortly after the Fall of Danu Talis, and Sophie was found in Russia in the ninth or tenth century) and they transform into their dragon-like true forms, revealing that they aren't Elders, but truly ancient beings called Earthlords, while stating their true goal was to use the twins’ auras to form a portal to the earliest days of Earth so they can summon the other Earthlords to this timeline and have them feed on all worlds. After defeating the pair, Tsagaglalal presents them with tablets from Abraham The Mage. Completing the prophecy "twins with the auras of silver and gold, a brother and sister with the power to either save the world ... or destroy it.", Sophie leaves Josh to destroy Danu Talis. Josh sits on the center of the Pyramid of the Sun and begins to read the Codex, discovering that Sophie, Joan, Scathach, Dare, and Aten lead the survivors onto the new Earth and assist them for several hundred years before returning to the present time. He then combines the Four Swords of Power (Clarent, Excalibur, Durendal, and Joyeuse) to create the fifth power--- Aether. The swords form a hook, revealing that Josh becomes/is Marethyu (hence revealing the reason why characters have always thought Marethyu seemed familiar). He plunges his hook into the center of the Pyramid of the Sun, speaking aloud the last words he read in the Codex ("Today I become Death, the destroyer of worlds") and thereby destroying Danu Talis. On Alcatraz, Nicholas and Perenelle spend their last moments together, content. Marethyu appears and tells Perenelle and the Alchemyst that he is Josh and takes them to Paris, apparently for the Flamels to die. In a letter to Sophie, Josh (Marethyu) describes Aoife and Niten's wedding, where Scathach was the bridesmaid and promises to Sophie that he will always watch over her.

== Audio book ==
The Enchantress is also available as an audiobook. It was released by Random House in May 2012, narrated by Paul Boehmer The ISBN for the audiobook is: ISBN 978-0-307-99095-2.
