= The Sorceress: The Secrets of the Immortal Nicholas Flamel =

2009 novel by Michael Scott

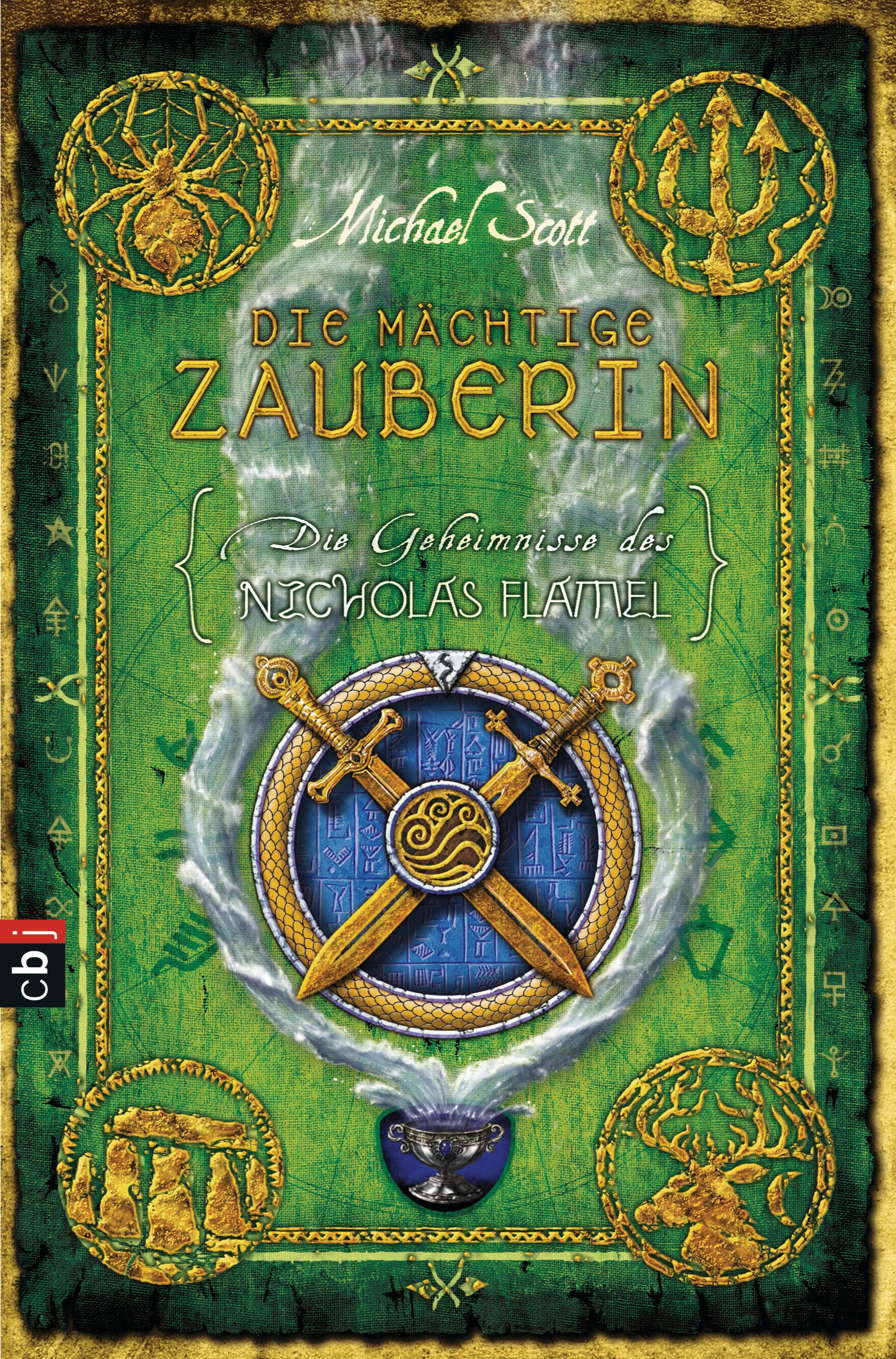
- German cover
- Author: Michael Scott
- Cover artist: Michael Wagner
- Language: English
- Series: The Secrets of the Immortal Nicholas Flamel
- Genre: Fantasy
- Publisher: Delacorte Press (US); Doubleday (UK)
- Publication date: 26 May 2009 (US); 25 June 2009 (UK)
- Publication place: United States
- Media type: Print (hardcover)
- Pages: 483
- ISBN: 978-0-385-73529-2 (US); 978-0-385-61312-5 (UK)
- Dewey Decimal: 823.914
- LC Class: PZ7.S42736Sor 2009
- Preceded by: The Magician
- Followed by: The Necromancer

The Sorceress: The Secrets of the Immortal Nicholas Flamel (often shortened to The Sorceress) is a fantasy novel and the third installment in the six-book series The Secrets of the Immortal Nicholas Flamel written by Michael Scott. It serves as the sequel to The Magician, and was released on 26 May 2009 in the US, 1 June 2009 in Australia, and 25 June 2009 in the UK. The titular sorceress refers to Perenelle Flamel.

== Title character ==
The title refers to Perenelle Flamel.

== Plot summary ==
Flamel takes the twins to London, where he uses Francis to enlist Palamedes, the Saracen Knight, to help them. Palamedes takes them to his home, a junk-yard in London, and they manage to work together to contact Perenelle. Perenelle is trapped on Alcatraz with the friendly but untrustworthy spider elder, Areop-Enap, after narrowly escaping the Sphinx and defeating the Morrigan. Morrigan had been suppressed sufficiently by the Words of Power that resided on the island that her body was retaken by her two elder sisters, Macha and Badb. Perenelle also makes fleeting contact with Scathach and Joan of Arc by scrying. Areop-Enap and its spider army are then attacked by an onslaught of poisoned flies, killing most of the spiders and wounding Areop-Enap. Billy the Kid has joined forces with Machiavelli in an attempt to kill the sorceress, but Perenelle, aided by Macha and Badb, tricks the pair and steals their boat, travelling back to the mainland with her new ally, the Crow Goddess.

Unfortunately, the Dark Elders have awakened an ancient being even more powerful and mysterious than them: an Archon (a being that predates the Elders). The Archon, named Cernunnos, is known as the Horned God and is the leader of a pack of wolf people called the Wild Hunt. Cernunnos, the Wild Hunt, and Dr Dee engage Shakespeare, the Gabriel Hounds, Palamedes, the twins, and Flamel in a vicious battle. Flamel, Palamedes and the twins manage to fight their way past Cernunnos and Dee and flee the destruction of the junkyard. They pick up Gilgamesh before heading towards Stonehenge. What Nicholas Flamel withheld from the twins is that Gilgamesh the King is insane. Though he has no magical aura - and hence cannot use any of his abilities - he can still pass on his knowledge to the Awakened human twins. Machiavelli uses his power as head of French intelligence to lock down the roads around Stonehenge, so they head to one of Shakespeare's nearby safe houses. Here Gilgamesh teaches the twins the magic of water. While the twins are adjusting to the powers Gilgamesh has taught them, Cernunnos returns with the Wild Hunt and attacks the twins and Gilgamesh. Gilgamesh is wounded by the Archon, but the twins use their newfound magical powers to protect the King. While making their escape, Josh loses Clarent, and Dee grabs the sword, reuniting it with its twin, Excalibur. The two swords fuse together to make a new sword. Flamel, Palamedes and the twins flee for Stonehenge with the Wild Hunt, Dee, and the police after them. They meet up with Shakespeare and the Gabriel Hounds who fled the junk-yard using a secret tunnel, the twins activate the ley lines at Stonehenge and the protagonists are greeted by Perenelle at the other end.

Meanwhile, Scathach and Joan of Arc try to get to Alcatraz to help Perenelle but are trapped in a shadow−realm by Machiavelli, who had deliberately set the trap to snare them. They do not know how to return to their time and must try to survive while they wait for Flamel and the others to find and rescue them.

== Characters new to the series ==
- Palamedes - Hired by Francis to assist Flamel and the twins. He is an immortal Saracen knight and had watched King Arthur fall in battle. He has the unusual ability to move freely throughout the Shadowrealms without suffering any ill effects. His aura is dark green and smells like cloves.
- William Shakespeare - The immortal human also known as the Bard. He trained under Nicholas Flamel and Dr. Dee . Some members of the Torc Madra, or Gabriel Hounds/ Ratchets are loyal to him. Lived with Palamedes in a junkyard until Flamel and the twins showed up. His aura is yellow and smells of lemon.
- Billy the Kid - Real name "Henry McCarthy". Sent to Alcatraz to kill Perenelle Flamel. Owns a Thunderbird convertible. His aura is a deep purple-red and smells of cayenne peppers.
- Gilgamesh the King - The oldest immortal human, also known as the "Ancient of Days". Gilgamesh knows all the Magics, but is unable to use them as he has no aura. The centuries have taken their toll on his mind often rendering him forgetful and confused, bordering on insane. Gilgamesh promised to remember Sophie after she shed a tear for him when he said that he could not even remember most of the things that happened in his life.
- Cernunnos - The Horned God. An Archon from the time before the Elders walked the earth. Master of the Wild Hunt. Sent to repay a debt to Dee's master by helping destroy Nicholas, Josh, Sophie and the others in the junkyard. Killed King Arthur and Mordred with Clarent.
- Nereus - "Old Man of the Sea". He and his daughters prevent Perenelle from leaving Alcatraz. Has eight tentacles rather than two legs.
- Genii Cucullati - Shape shifting flesh eaters sent to meet Flamel and his group in London by John Dee.
- Gabriel Hounds - Also known as Torc Madra and Ratchets. These are the dog-men loyal to William Shakespeare. They help defend the junkyard castle against the attack from Cernunnos and his Wild Hunt.

== Special variations and editions ==
The Sorceress was released as part of a special edition boxed 3-book set called The First Codex in the USA on 28 September 2010.

The Sorceress is also available as an unabridged audiobook. It was released by the Listening Library on 26 May 2009 and narrated by Paul Boehmer. The ISBN numbers for the audiobook are: 978-0-7393-8055-0 (UK), 978-0-7393-8055-0 (US).

== Award nominations ==
- Amazon - Best Books of 2009, Top 10 Children's Books: Middle Readers.
- Cybills (Children and Young Bloggers Literary Awards) - 2009 Nominations, fantasy & science-fiction: Elementary/Middle Years.

== Online game ==
To celebrate the release of The Sorceress an online game was created. It was called The Challenges of the Elder and launched on 21 April 2009. Players are guided through the game, which is a set of four challenges, by video scenes featuring Michael Scott. The first task, the Alchemyst's challenge, required players to assemble a moving jigsaw of the series' logo against a countdown clock. The second task, the Magician's challenge, required players to turn over two books from a series of books and find matching symbols, when a matching pair was found both books burst into flames and disappeared. The task was complete when all the books had been matched. The third task, the Sorceress' challenge was a colour sequencing game where players chose coloured flasks and would have to repeat the sequence that they were shown in. Players then advanced to meet The Elder, who asked them a set of knowledge questions about the books and were given a coloured aura depending on their scores and time taken in the tasks.

== Sequel ==
The sequel The Necromancer: The Secrets of the Immortal Nicholas Flamel was released on 25 May 2010 in the USA. and 5 August 2010 in the UK.
