= The Secrets of the Immortal Nicholas Flamel =

Fantasy book series by Michael Scott

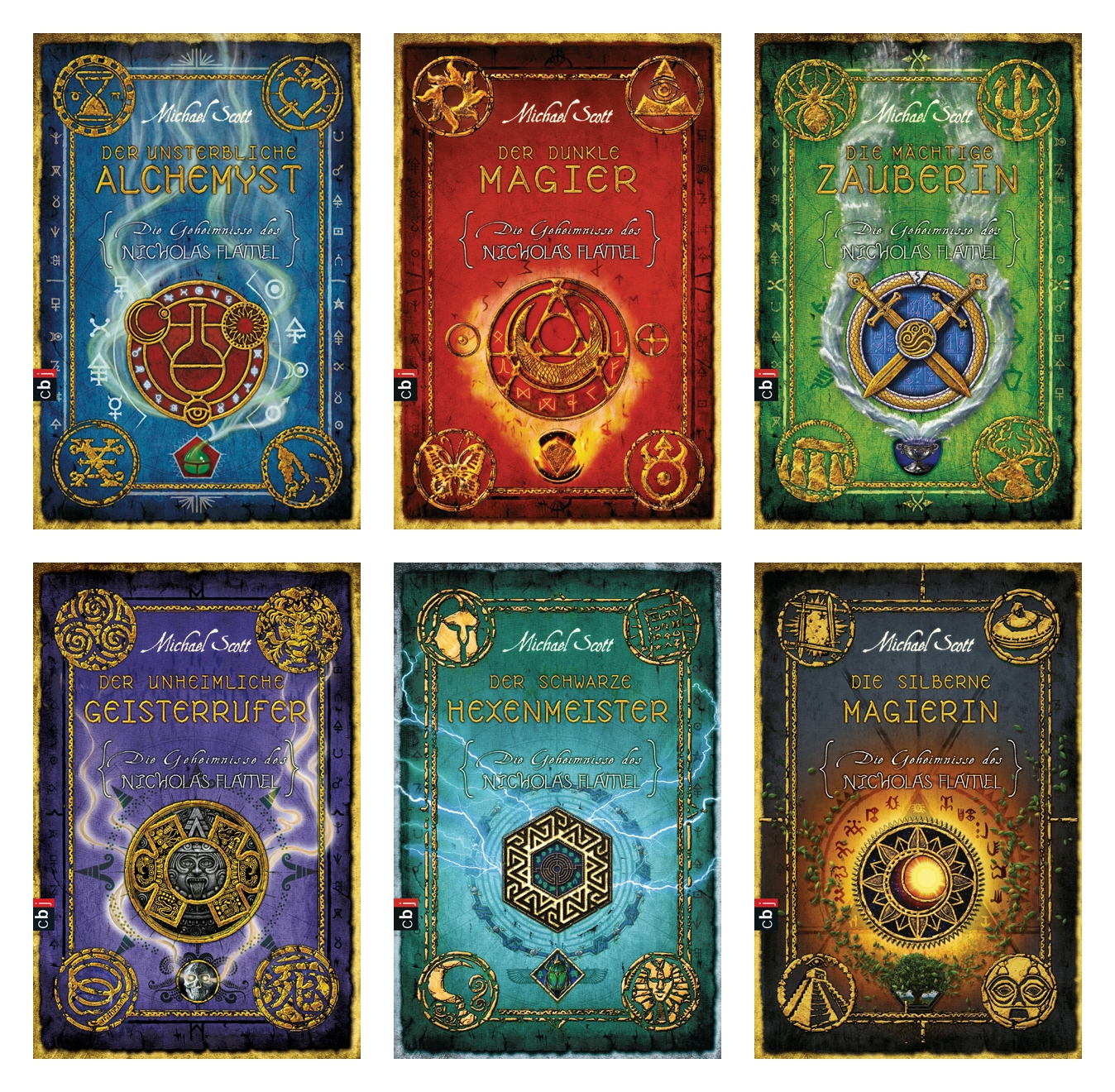
- German covers
- The Alchemyst (2007); The Magician (2008); The Sorceress (2009); The Necromancer (2010); The Warlock (2011); The Enchantress (2012)
- Author: Michael Scott
- Cover artist: Michael Wagner
- Country: United States
- Language: English
- Genre: Fantasy; Thriller; Young adult
- Publisher: Random House
- Published: 22 May 2007
- Media type: Print (hardcover and paperback); Audiobook

The Secrets of the Immortal Nicholas Flamel is a series of six fantasy novels written by Irish author Michael Scott, completed in 2012. The first book in the series, The Alchemyst, was released in 2007, and the sequels were released at the rate of one per year, concluding with The Enchantress in 2012. The cover artist for the series is Michael Wagner.

English-language versions are printed by Doubleday (hardback) and Corgi (paperback) (imprints of Random House) in the UK and Australia, and by Delacorte Press (hardback and paperback; also an imprint of Random House) in the US. As of November 2009, the translation rights have been purchased by 37 countries and the books have been translated into 20 languages. Each of the first four titles featured in the top ten of the New York Times Best Seller Children's Books list. The Alchemyst reached No. 2 on 26 August 2007 and as of 24 March 2008 it had sold in excess of 150,000 copies. The Magician reached No. 4 on 13 July 2008. The Sorceress reached No. 5, and The Necromancer reached No. 3. The books have been nominated for various teen literary and reader's awards. The film rights to the series have been bought by AMPCO Films.

== Plot overview ==
The main story arc charts the adventures of fifteen-year-old American twins, named Sophie and Josh Newman, whose regular lives working at their summer jobs (Sophie works in a coffee shop, Josh in a bookstore) are turned upside down by the arrival of Dr. John Dee. Dr. Dee engages the bookstore owner, Nick Fleming, in a battle of magic in an attempt to steal an ancient book, The Book of Abraham the Mage (a.k.a. the Codex) from him. Dr. John Dee snatches the book from Josh's grasp, but Josh manages to retain two pages. Dr. John Dee also kidnaps Nick's wife Perry Fleming and imprisons her on Alcatraz Island.

After the battle, Nick Fleming confesses to Josh and Sophie that his real name is Nicholas Flamel, that he is the French alchemist from history, that he is also immortal, and that the twins, himself, and Perry (his immortal wife, Perenelle Flamel), are in grave danger. Nicholas tells the twins that he believes them to be mentioned in a prophecy within the Codex, and that the fate of the world as they know it could depend on his success in getting their latent magical abilities fully awakened. He also tells them that without the Codex, both he and Perry will die within a month, as their immortality, prolonged youth, and longevity depend on a recipe for a special elixir found only within its pages. This elixir changes monthly and cannot be memorised.

Meanwhile, Dr. John Dee has found out that he is missing two vital pages from the Codex. The pages are the Final Summoning, needed by him to return his masters, the Dark Elders, to earth... and so begins a fast-paced race as Dee pursues the twins and Nicholas for the pages of the Codex, whilst Nicholas, aided by Scáthach and others, race to get the twins' latent magical auras awakened, to get them schooled in the use of the elemental magics – Water, Fire, Earth, Air, and Aether – and to rescue his wife, Perry.

The stories criss-cross the globe, featuring well-known places and sights, such as San Francisco, London, the Eiffel Tower, Stonehenge, and the Golden Gate Bridge. Many characters from history and mythology help both sides pursue their goals. In the first four books alone, Scáthach, Hekate, Prometheus, the Witch of Endor, Gilgamesh, Niccolò Machiavelli, Bastet, Odin, William Shakespeare, Joan of Arc, Billy the Kid, Virginia Dare, the Count of St. Germain, and Mars Ultor enter the series.

== Development ==
The idea for the series as a whole began in May 1997. Initially, the series had Dr. Dee in the leading role, and was going to be called The Secrets of John Dee, a historical character who Scott knew well, having featured him in three of his other titles: Image, Reflection, and The Merchant Prince. He wanted to bring Dr. Dee into the 21st Century and introduce him to a young audience that may not have heard of the historical doctor before, but he decided that Dr. Dee was too sinister and had dubious motivation. Inspiration struck one night in 2000, when Scott took a wrong turn whilst wandering around Paris and happened upon Nicholas Flamel's house in the Rue du Montmorency. Having decided that he had found the perfect mentor for the twins, Scott began plotting the series in earnest, planning the storyline of each chapter. He soon decided that it would be a six-book series, which would allow him to introduce many figures from history and mythology. In the six books, readers have been introduced to characters from the Greco-Roman, Egyptian, Norse, and Celtic mythologies and historical characters from the Elizabethan, Renaissance, Egyptian, and Gilded eras. He plotted the whole series to such an intricate level that his plot script is currently in excess of 80,000 words, equivalent to a book itself, and that he knew in 2009 what the last words to the series would be.

== Main characters ==
Nicholas Flamel – The title character, an alchemyst. Along with his wife, Perenelle, he has lived for nearly 700 years searching for Josh and Sophie Newman, the Gold and Silver twins of legend, who can save the Shadowrealm of Earth from the mad Dr. John Dee and the Dark Elders who seek to destroy it. Flamel is a legend who built his fortune through alchemy, which he uses to amazing effect to combat the horrors Dee sends after the twins and himself. Despite good intentions, however, he is not without flaws, like being selfish and not learning from his mistakes and seeks glory for training Josh and Sophie.

Josh Newman – The Gold twin of legend. Awakened by Mars Ultor, Josh is a lover of history and a natural strategist. However, he is suspicious of Nicholas Flamel, due to his not telling them of the previous twins' demise, a fact that causes Josh to temporarily shift alliances, though he remains cautious of Dee. Eventually, he sides with Flamel.

Sophie Newman – The Silver twin of legend. Awakened by Hekate (the Goddess of Three Faces), and later trained by The Witch of Endor, who infuses her memories and experiences into her. Sophie is protective of Josh and more patient, though she is also horrified by the twins' fates. She decides to side with the Flamels to save Earth, but seeks out her brother eventually.

Dr. John Dee – The main antagonist. An English magician and necromancer who formerly advised Queen Elizabeth I, he seeks to bring back to Earth the Dark Elders, who wish to destroy and rebuild it. However, after he is declared utlaga, or outlaw, for failing them, he decides to use the four swords of power – Excalibur, Clarent, Joyeuse and Durendal – to go back in time to Danu Talis and destroy them, convincing Josh to join his side with the promise of a renewed Earth. Eventually he sides with the Flamels but by then it is too late.

Perenelle Flamel – The wife of Nicholas, and a powerful sorceress. Being the seventh daughter of a seventh daughter, she can contact ghosts and has a long-standing feud with Machiavelli. Many have suggested, correctly, that she is much more powerful than Nicholas, as she has proven as she tries to save San Francisco from the horrors on nearby Alcatraz.

Niccolò Machiavelli – A renowned Italian philosopher and eventual warlock, or waerloga, who is tasked with releasing an army from Alcatraz after helping Dee in Paris. He and Josh have an understanding, as they are both human in spirit, a trait which he later shares with Billy the Kid. This trait causes Machiavelli to re-evaluate his opinions of the Dark Elders and reform and break his oaths to them, choosing not to release the monsters on the humani.

Scathach – The Celtic goddess of the war. She has a grey aura. She is an Elder of the 2nd generation and a vegetarian vampire. She is approximately 10000 years old but looks 17 and claims to be 2000. She will accompany the alchemist and the twins in their adventures but will be taken by Dagon in the Seine. It is the great friend of Joan of Arc, that she educated. She was the creator of most of the martial arts and formed the biggest Heroes of the History. To have helped the human beings during the Fall of Danu Talis, she was rejected by her family before saving their life a few years later. She speaks few his parents and her brother. She has a twin sister (Aifé) but they would have long ago become muddled because of a boy, they do not speak to each other any more. Scathach is also called "the Shadow", the "Goddess Warrior", "the King Maker", "the Warrior Maiden" "the Daemon Slayer" and Scatty. Her grandmother is the Witch of Endor, her presumed grandfather being Mars Ultor.

== Titles' significance ==
On 1 July 2012 Michael Scott issued this statement incontrovertibly naming the title characters so far.

"Each book in the series is named after a character. Some are easy to guess (The Alchemyst is Flamel, for example), but others require a closer reading of the text. So here, to avoid endless Wikipedia changes, is the (almost) definitive list.

- The Alchemyst is Nicholas Flamel.
- The Magician is Dr. John Dee.
- The Sorceress is Perenelle Flamel.
- The Necromancer is Josh Newman.
- The Warlock is Mars Ultor.
- The Enchantress is Sophie Newman.

== Special editions and cover variations ==
On 5 August 2010 in the UK Necromancer was released featuring a new-style cover; it was joined by The Alchemyst, The Magician and The Sorceress which were re-released with new covers in the same style.

The Alchemyst, The Magician and The Sorceress were released as a special edition boxed set called The First Codex in the USA on 28 September 2010.

== Series chronology ==
In published order:

- The Alchemyst – released on 22 May 2007 (US), 24 May 2007 (UK)
- The Magician – released on 5 June 2008 (UK), 24 June 2008 (US)
- The Sorceress – released on 26 May 2009 (US), 25 June 2009 (UK)
- The Necromancer – released on 25 May 2010 (US), 5 August 2010 (UK)
- The Warlock – released on 24 May 2011 (US), 2 June 2011 (UK)
- The Enchantress – released on 22 May 2012

=== Side stories ===
- "The Death of Joan of Arc" – released 24 August 2010 in eBook format
- "Billy the Kid and the Vampyres of Vegas: A Lost Story from the Secrets of the Immortal Nicholas Flamel" – released 22 November 2011

== Online games ==
The Secrets of the Immortal Nicholas Flamel series has spawned online games. The first related online game to be launched was The Codex Master The game is to guess a secret code consisting of a sequence of coloured orbs by inputting various sequences and using logic. When a sequence is entered, indicators show when the player has the right colour and also when a colour is in the right or wrong position to enable them to apply logic and guess the correct sequence.

An online game was created to celebrate the release of The Sorceress. It was called The Challenges of the Elder and launched on 21 April 2009. Players are guided through the game, which is a set of four challenges, by video scenes featuring Michael Scott. The first task, the Alchemyst's challenge, required players to assemble a moving jigsaw of the series' logo against a countdown clock. The second task, the Magician's challenge, required players to turn over two books from a series of books and find matching symbols; when a matching pair was found both books burst into flames and disappeared. The task was complete when all the books had been matched. The third task, the Sorceress' challenge, was a colour sequencing game where players chose coloured flasks and would have to repeat the sequence that they were shown in. Players then advanced to meet The Elder, who asked them a set of knowledge questions about the books, and were given a 'coloured aura ranking' calculated from their scores and time taken to complete the tasks.

To promote the USA release of The Necromancer, Random House released an online game called The Quest for the Codex. Players were presented with a grid containing numbered squares and had to click on the squares to uncover hidden rewards, playing pieces and mini-games. When they completed the game they received online access to the first 6 chapters of The Necromancer.

== Awards and nominations ==
The Alchemyst

- Irish Book of the Year – 2008
- Kentucky Bluegrass Book Award
- Maine Student Book Award
- Nevada Young Readers Award
- North Carolina School Library Media Association Young Adult Book Award – 2010
- Rhode Island Book Award – 2008 (bested 200 other titles that were entered)

The Magician

- 2009 Irish Book of the Year – The Dublin Airport Authority Irish Children's Book of the Year – Snr Category

The Sorceress

- Amazon – Best Books of 2009, Top 10 Children's Books: Middle Readers
- Cybills (Children and Young Bloggers Literary Awards) – 2009 Nominations, fantasy & science-fiction: Elementary/Middle Years

== Audiobooks ==
The six titles have all been recorded as unabridged audiobooks. The Alchemyst was narrated by Denis O'Hare. The Magician was narrated by Erik Singer. The Sorceress, The Necromancer, The Warlock and The Enchantress were narrated by Paul Boehmer.

== Film adaptation ==
Film rights were initially sold in 2006 to New Line Cinema. New Line was absorbed by Warner and the rights reverted to Michael Scott, and in 2009 Lorenzo di Bonaventura bought the film rights to the series.

In 2011 Michael Scott stated:

"There has been tremendous interest in the series and eventually, it went to Lorenzo di Bonaventura, who is the man responsible for bringing Harry Potter to Warner when he was there. He genuinely loves this series. The next step now is to attach a writer – I will not write it, I have 3 more books to do!"

In 2012, it was announced that AMPCO Films had acquired the film rights. Production was set to begin in February 2013 in Australia and New Zealand. Michael Scott was scheduled to write the screenplay, saying he would like it to be true to the books.
