= The Thirteen Hallows =

2011 fantasy novel by Michael Scott and Colette Freedman

- Author: Michael Scott, Colette Freedman
- Cover artist: Jitka Saniova
- Language: English
- Genre: Fantasy, Thriller, Fiction, Mythology
- Publisher: Tor Books
- Publication date: 6 December 2011 (US) (UK)
- Publication place: Ireland
- Media type: Print (Hardback)
- Pages: 349 p. (US hardback)
- ISBN: 0-7653-2852-6 (US) (UK)
- Followed by: The Hallowed Keepers

The Thirteen Hallows is the first novel in a fantasy fiction series that focuses on the thirteen treasures of the Island of Britain. The book was written by authors Michael Scott and Colette Freedman. It was published in December 2011 in both the United Kingdom and the United States. The book shares a similar plot line as one of Scott's earlier novels, The Hallows. Scott has announced that he and Freedman are currently working on a sequel to The Thirteen Hallows, with plans for a third book in the series.

== Reception ==
Critical reception to The Thirteen Hallows has been mixed, with Kirkus Reviews saying that the book was "manufactured" but "could have been a lot worse". Blogcritics also reviewed the book, writing that the book was "most violent and bloody urban fantasy I have ever read" but that "where the violence put me off a few times, the story kept pulling me back in." The A.V. Club gave the book a "C−", saying that the book was "flat and unnecessary". Publishers Weekly positively reviewed the book, stating that The Thirteen Hallows had "relentless pacing and a richly detailed story".
