= The Necromancer: The Secrets of the Immortal Nicholas Flamel =

2010 novel by Michael Scott

- First edition U.S. cover of The Necromancer: The Secrets of the Immortal Nicholas Flamel
- Author: Michael Scott
- Cover artist: Michael Wagner
- Language: English
- Series: The Secrets of the Immortal Nicholas Flamel
- Genre: Fantasy
- Publisher: Delacorte Press (US); Doubleday (UK)
- Publication date: 25 May 2010 (US & UK)
- Publication place: United States
- Media type: Print (hardcover)
- Pages: 416
- ISBN: 978-0-385-73531-5 (US); 978-0-385-90516-9 (UK)
- Dewey Decimal: 823.914
- LC Class: PZ7.S42736Nec 2010
- Preceded by: The Sorceress
- Followed by: The Warlock

The Necromancer: The Secrets of the Immortal Nicholas Flamel (often shortened to The Necromancer) is the fourth book of the series The Secrets of the Immortal Nicholas Flamel, written by Irish author Michael Scott. It was published in the United States and United Kingdom on 25 May 2010, by Delacorte Press, an imprint of Random House. A new edition was released on 5 August 2010 featuring a redesigned cover.

The Necromancer entered The New York Times Best Seller list (Children's) at #3 on its first week of release. The audio book version (released at the same time in the USA) is read by Paul Boehmer.

== Title character ==
The book's title, The Necromancer, refers to Josh Newman. Michael Scott would not name the Necromancer online until the book had been released around the world, merely saying, "The Necromancer is not Dr Dee." He later stated: "So clearly, Josh Newman is a Necromancer..."

== Plot summary ==
Nicholas Flamel, Perenelle Flamel, Sophie, and Josh return to San Francisco. The Flamels go to their book store while Josh and Sophie head for their Aunt Agnes' house. When they approach they see a limousine waiting outside and a stranger talking to their Aunt. They approach with caution but in the following scuffle on the doorstep Sophie is dragged into the car by a female looking exactly like their lost friend Scathach, but who is in fact her twin, Aoife. Josh races to the book store to alert Nicholas and Perry and together, they set out to rescue Sophie who has been taken to a houseboat in Sausalito owned by Aoife's companion, the Japanese immortal, Niten.

Dr. Dee has been declared utlaga (a wanted man) for his failure to capture the missing pages of the Codex by his Dark Elder masters. Not wanting to experience their wrath, he flees. He makes his way across England from Salisbury Plain to his London office with the last two legendary swords, now fused together, in his possession. Once in London he enlists the help of an old acquaintance, Virginia Dare, and after an encounter with some cucubuth bounty hunters the pair escape to Dee's home in San Francisco, where he prepares to call back the Archon Coatlicue – the Mother of the Gods – to help him with his plans to conquer planet Earth and take revenge on The Dark Elders that made him an outlaw.

Joan of Arc and Scathach are joined in their exile by William Shakespeare, Palamedes and the Comte de Saint-Germain after they seek out Lord Tammuz's help. Shortly after they are reunited they are joined by the mysterious, hooded, hook-handed man who tells them that he has a pre-destined mission for them. He takes them through Xibalba and several other shadow realms to the Earth over ten thousands years ago, when Danu Talis still existed and they have to fight in the battle that meant its downfall.

Niccolò Machiavelli and Billy the Kid get off the monster filled Alcatraz Island with the help of Billy's Dark Elder Master who sends the immortal Black Hawk to retrieve them and bring them both back to his house. After a fraught meeting with Billy's master they count themselves lucky to be alive as they had failed to accomplish the missions given to them by their masters: to kill Perenelle and to set loose the monsters trapped on the island onto San Francisco. The pair set out to return to Alcatraz and make amends by achieving what they were tasked with doing.

After their initially tense meeting, Aoife, Niten, Josh, Sophie, Nicholas, and Perenelle agree to travel to Point Reyes so that Josh can be taught the magic of fire by Prometheus, the Master of Fire. Josh is separated from the others shortly after learning the magic of fire and finds himself walking into Dee's home, Sophie wakes up and realizes that Josh is missing. After alerting the others about his disappearance they track Josh to Dee's home. Sophie, Aoife and Niten race to stop him from unwittingly helping Dee complete his plan to summon the fearsome Coatlicue who Dee plans to turn loose on the Dark Elders, while Nicholas and Perenelle stay with Prometheus, following what they do. Josh, still under enchantment, turns against his sister and escapes with Dr. Dee and Virginia Dare, while Aoife pushes Coatlicue back into the shadowrealm it came from, but leaving herself trapped with it. This leaves the end of the book on a cliff hanger. The Flamels are very weak, the twins are divided, and the Dark Elders are gathering in anticipation of the Final Summoning at Litha, when they hope to return to power and dominate the world

== Characters new to the series ==
- Aoife – Scathach's twin sister.
- Niten – An immortal Japanese swordsman, who has a dark blue aura that smells like green tea.
- Coatlicue – Mother of All, a fiendish Archon.
- Quetzalcoatl – The Feathered Serpent, Billy's master.
- Prometheus – Master of Fire. Trains Josh in the Magic of Fire and Aoife's and Scathach's uncle. He has a red aura that smells like anise.
- Lord Tammuz – The Green Man and Palamedes' master.
- Virginia Dare – Immortal, dangerous human; joins Dee, owns a flute with the power to render animals and humani unconscious. Her aura smells of sage.
- Black Hawk – Immortal Native American who assists Billy the Kid.
- Marethyu – The hook-handed man who translated the Codex. Marethyu means "Death" in the ancient language that was spoken on Danu Talis. Created a Pleistocene Shadowrealm. He leads several characters out of his Shadowrealm through a special code of leygates that follows the Fibonacci sequence: 1, 1, 2, 3, 5, 8, and 13.

== Other versions ==
On 5 August 2010, in the UK The Necromancer was released featuring a new style cover.

The Necromancer is also available as an unabridged audiobook, narrated by Paul Boehmer. It was released by the Listening Library on 25 May 2010, in the US and on 5 August 2010, in the UK.

== Online game ==
For The Necromancer release a new game was launched on 5 May 2010. It was called The Quest for the Codex. Players were presented with a map, divided up into a grid, they were then allowed 10 clicks per day to find hidden rewards, playing pieces and to unlock three mini-games. Players were awarded a key for each mini-game that they completed. When they completed all 3 mini-games and had all three keys they received online access to the first six chapters of The Necromancer.

== Film adaptation ==
On 19 November 2009, it was announced in Variety Magazine that Lorenzo di Bonaventura had bought the film rights to the series. Michael Scott and Barry Krost will be the executive producers. The script writer has yet to be announced. IMDb now lists The Alchemyst film as "in production"
