= Michael Scott (Irish author) =

Irish author, scriptwriter, folklore collector

- Born: Michael Peter Scott; 28 September 1959 (age 66); Dublin, Ireland
- Occupation: Writer
- Writing career
- Pen name: Anna Dillon
- Period: 1983–present
- Notable work: The Secrets of the Immortal Nicholas Flamel series
- Website: dillonscott.com

Michael Peter Scott (born 28 September 1959) is an Irish writer of science fiction, fantasy, horror, and, under the name Anna Dillon, romance novels. He is also a collector and editor of folklore. Scott is best known for his The Secrets of the Immortal Nicholas Flamel book series.

== Career ==
=== Early career ===
Scott traveled across Ireland as a dealer of rare and antique books before beginning his writing and directing career.

=== Writing ===
Scott has produced over 100 books in more than 30 years of active writing. He has written short stories and novels for adults, young adults, and children, in many genres including science fiction, fantasy, horror, folklore, and romance.

His first book (inspired by his fascination with Irish mythology), Irish Folk and Fairy Tales, volume 1, was published in 1983 and became part of a trilogy documenting a large number of Irish folk tales that had, in some cases, only been told verbally prior to his collection. The Irish Folk and Fairy Tales volumes were the culmination of Scott's extensive travels across Ireland whilst working as a book dealer, documenting the tales he found along the way.

When reviewing Scott's The De Danann Tales, the Irish Times described him as "the King of Fantasy in these Isles," and the Irish Children's Book Trust in their Definitive Guide to Children's Books recognized him, for his "unparalleled contribution to Children's Literature". The De Danann Tales was scheduled to be a series of five books but only three were ever published. He also co-authored two books of a projected trilogy with Morgan Llywelyn, and one standalone book.

He is best known for his six-book young adult series, The Secrets of the Immortal Nicholas Flamel.

Scott is also an experienced scriptwriter for stage and screen, having written for a number of projects including documentaries and drama. He once headed up the drama department in Tyrone Productions, the creators of Riverdance. While working there he scripted high-profile events such as the 2003 Special Olympics which were held in Ireland, and the Irish Film and Television Awards. Michael Scott was the Writer in Residence during Dublin's tenure as the European City of Culture in 1991 he featured in the 2006 edition of Who's Who in Ireland as one of the 1,000 "most significant Irish".

Scott has also written a number of drama/romance novels under the pseudonym Anna Dillon.

=== Doctor Who ===
On 5 February 2013 Michael Scott was announced as the author of The Nameless City, a short story commissioned by the BBC to celebrate the 50th anniversary year of the TV series Doctor Who. The story features the second Doctor, played by Patrick Troughton and his companion Jamie McCrimmon. It was released on 23 February 2013 as an ebook initially, and featured a special celebratory printed anthology which was released alongside the final e-story on 23 November 2013 by Puffin Books

=== Styles and genres ===
Scott's stated first love is mythology. He says that his background, growing up in Ireland with its rich mythology, led him to be naturally drawn to myths. Irish mythology emerged through history relatively unscathed and uninfluenced as they were not invaded by the Romans or Greeks. History also has a strong impact on his style, as it was his favourite subject in school. However, while he has a special taste for mythology, Scott writes what purely interests him, which has led him to write across many genres and styles. He doesn't restrict himself with genre labelling - he says is only interested in being a writer, not a writer of any specific genre.

== Nicholas Flamel ==
=== Books ===
The first book in Scott's The Secrets of the Immortal Nicholas Flamel six book series, The Alchemyst, reached #2 on the New York Times Best Seller, Children's list on 26 August 2007 and as of 24 March 2008 it had sold in excess of 150,000 copies. The second book in that series, The Magician, reached #4 on the New York Times Best Seller list on 13 July 2008. The series has to date been printed in 20 languages and is available in 37 countries. He wrote the entire series out of fascination with history and inspiration from other places.

=== Online games ===
The Secrets of the Immortal Nicholas Flamel series has spawned online games, the first related online game to be launched was The Codex Master The game is to guess a secret code consisting of a sequence of coloured orbs by inputting various sequences and using logic. When a sequence is entered, indicators show when the player has the right colour and also when a colour is in the right or wrong position to enable them to apply logic and guess the correct sequence.

To celebrate the release of The Sorceress an online game was created. It was called The Challenges of the Elder and launched on 21 April 2009. Players are guided through the game, which is a set of four challenges, by video scenes featuring Michael Scott. The first task, the Alchemyst's challenge, required players to assemble a moving jigsaw of the series' logo against a countdown clock. The second task, the Magician's challenge, required players to turn over two books from a series of books and find matching symbols, when a matching pair was found both books burst into flames and disappeared. The task was complete when all the books had been matched. The third task, the Sorceress' challenge was a colour sequencing game where players chose coloured flasks and would have to repeat the sequence that they were shown in. Players then advanced to meet The Elder, who asked them a set of knowledge questions about the books and were given a 'coloured aura ranking' calculated from their scores and time taken to complete the tasks.

=== Film adaptation ===
The film rights to The Secrets of the Immortal Nicholas Flamel series became available in late 2009, and on 19 November 2009 it was announced in Variety Magazine that Lorenzo di Bonaventura had bought the film rights to the series. Michael Scott and Barry Krost will be the executive producers. The script writer has yet to be announced. IMDb now lists The Alchemyst film as "in development"

"Well, I have been promising news of the Flamel movie. Here's the press release. The movie was set up with New Line, but New Line were absorbed by Warner and the rights reverted to me. There has been tremendous interest in the series and eventually, it went to Lorenzo di Bonaventura, who is the man responsible for bringing Harry Potter to Warner when he was there. He genuinely loves this series. The next step now is to attach a writer — I will not write it, I have 3 more books to do!"

— Michael Scott

=== Award nominations ===
Scott's The Secrets of the Immortal Nicholas Flamel series has thus far garnered him 10 literary award nominations. The Alchemyst was the winner of the 2008 Rhode Island Book Award (Teens) after beating 200 other nominated titles.

The Alchemyst was nominated for:

- Irish Book of the Year 2008
- Kentucky Bluegrass Book Award
- Maine Student Book Award
- Nevada Young Readers Award
- NCSLMA YA Book Award - 2010
- Rhode Island Book Award 2008– (Winner)

The Magician was nominated for:

- 2009 Irish Book of the Year Award — The Dublin Airport Authority Irish Children's Book of the Year — Snr Category.

The Sorceress was nominated for:

- Amazon - Best Books of 2009, Top 10 Children's Books: Middle Readers.
- Cybills (Children and Young Bloggers Literary Awards) - 2009 Nominations, fantasy & science-fiction: Elementary/Middle Years.

== Bibliography ==
=== Young readers ===
Illustrated

- The Piper's Ring (illustrated by Ian Deuchar, 1992) ISBN 0-460-88130-2; ISBN 978-0-460-88130-2
- Fungie and the Magical Kingdom (illustrated by Steve Simpson, 1994) ISBN 978-1-899565-00-9; ISBN 1-899565-00-0

Science Fiction

- Doctor Who: The Nameless City (2013)

=== Young adult books ===
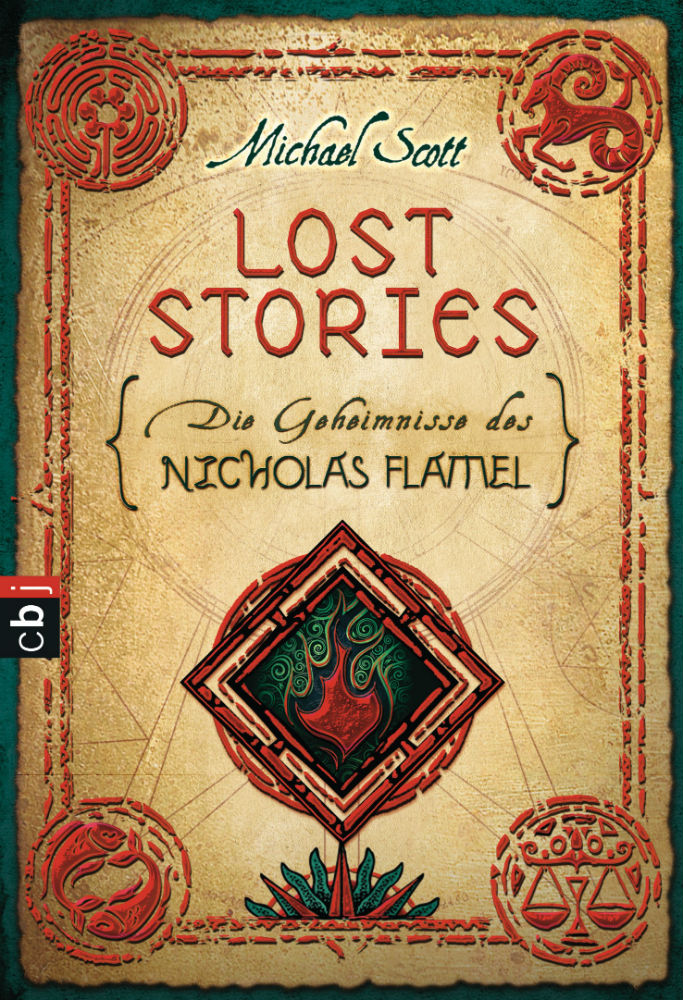
2015 German translation book cover

Fantasy

- Tales from the Land of Erin 1: A Bright Enchantment (1985) ISBN 0-7221-7643-0; ISBN 978-0-7221-7643-6
- Tales from the Land of Erin 2: A Golden Dream (1985) ISBN 0-7221-7644-9; ISBN 978-0-7221-7644-3
- Tales from the Land of Erin 3: A Silver Wish (1985) ISBN 0-7221-7645-7; ISBN 978-0-7221-7645-0
- The De Danann Tales 1: Windlord (1991) ISBN 0-86327-296-7; ISBN 978-0-86327-296-7
- The De Danann Tales 2: Earthlord (1992) ISBN 0-86327-343-2; ISBN 978-0-86327-343-8
- The De Danann Tales 3: Firelord (1994) ISBN 0-86327-385-8; ISBN 978-0-86327-385-8
- The De Danann Tales 4: Sealord was scheduled (and its cover published) and apparently written (with possibly even a fifth volume), but nothing was released and the series storyline was never completed.
- The Alchemyst: The Secrets of the Immortal Nicholas Flamel (2007) ISBN 0-552-55709-9; ISBN 978-0-552-55709-2
- The Magician: The Secrets of the Immortal Nicholas Flamel (2008) ISBN 0-552-55723-4; ISBN 978-0-552-55723-8
- The Sorceress: The Secrets of the Immortal Nicholas Flamel (2009) ISBN 0-385-61312-1; ISBN 978-0-385-61312-5
- The Necromancer: The Secrets of the Immortal Nicholas Flamel (2010) ISBN 0-385-73531-6; ISBN 978-0-385-73531-5
- The Warlock: The Secrets of the Immortal Nicholas Flamel (2011) ISBN 0-385-73533-2; ISBN 978-0-385-73533-9
- The Enchantress: The Secrets of the Immortal Nicholas Flamel (2012) ISBN 0-385-73535-9; ISBN 978-0-385-73535-3
- The Secrets of the Immortal Nicholas Flamel: The Lost Stories Collection (2021) ISBN 0-593-37690-0; ISBN 978-0-593-37690-4

Folk Tales

- Song of the Children of Lir (Dublin: De Vogel Ltd, 1983) ISBN 0-946860-00-9; ISBN 978-0-946860-00-5; also published as The Children of Lir: An Irish Legend (Magnet, Methuen Children's Books, 1986) ISBN 0-7497-0888-3; ISBN 978-0-7497-0888-7
- The Last of the Fianna (Pied Piper, Methuen Children's Books, 1987); also published as The Last of the Fianna: An Irish Legend (Dublin: O'Brien Press, 1992) ISBN 0-86278-308-9; ISBN 978-0-86278-308-2
- The Quest of the Sons (a.k.a. The Seven Treasures, 1988) ISBN 0-7497-0006-8; ISBN 978-0-7497-0006-5
- Green and Golden Tales: Irish Hero Tales (collection, 1988) ISBN 0-85342-868-9; ISBN 978-0-85342-868-8
- Green and Golden Tales: Irish Fairy Tales (collection, 1988) ISBN 0-85342-866-2; ISBN 978-0-85342-866-4
- Green and Golden Tales: Irish Animal Tales (collection, 1989) ISBN 0-85342-867-0; ISBN 978-0-85342-867-1
- Saint Patrick (1990)
- Magical Irish Folk Tales (collection, 1995) ISBN 1-85635-110-6; ISBN 978-1-85635-110-2

Teen Adventure

- Judith and The Traveller (as Mike Scott, 1991) ISBN 0-86327-299-1; ISBN 978-0-86327-299-8
- Judith and Spider (as Mike Scott, 1992) ISBN 0-86327-347-5; ISBN 978-0-86327-347-6
- Good Enough for Judith (as Mike Scott, 1994) ISBN 0-86327-396-3; ISBN 978-0-86327-396-4

Science Fiction

- Gemini Game (1994) ISBN 0-86278-332-1; ISBN 978-0-86278-332-7

Illustrated

- The Story of Ireland (illustrated by Hemesh Alles) (collection, 1990) ISBN 0-460-88092-6; ISBN 978-0-460-88092-3

=== Adult books ===
Horror

- October Moon (1992) ISBN 0-86278-300-3; ISBN 978-0-86278-300-6
- Wolf Moon (1995) ISBN 0-86278-420-4; ISBN 978-0-86278-420-1
- House of the Dead (1993) ISBN 0-86278-339-9; ISBN 978-0-86278-339-6
- Vampyre (1995) ISBN 1-85371-545-X; ISBN 978-1-85371-545-7
- Vampyres of Hollywood (with Adrienne Barbeau, 2008) ISBN 0-312-36722-8; ISBN 978-0-312-36722-0
- 19 Railway Street (with Morgan Llywelyn, 1996) ISBN 1-85371-642-1; ISBN 978-1-85371-642-3
- Banshee (1990) ISBN 0-7493-0111-2; ISBN 978-0-7493-0111-8
- Image (1991) ISBN 978-0-7474-0884-0 ISBN 0-7474-0884-X
- Reflection (1993) ISBN 978-0-7515-0047-9; ISBN 0-7515-0047-X
- Imp (1993) ISBN 0-7493-0111-2; ISBN 978-0-7493-0111-8
- The Hallows (Creed) (1995) ISBN 0-451-18379-7; ISBN 978-0-451-18379-8
- Mirror Image (2016) with Melanie Ruth Rose; ISBN 978-0-7653-8522-2

Fantasy

- A Celtic Odyssey (a.k.a. The Voyage of Maildun, 1985) ISBN 0-7221-7642-2; ISBN 978-0-7221-7642-9
- Tales of the Bard 1: Magician's Law (1987) ISBN 0-7221-7775-5; ISBN 978-0-7221-7775-4
- Tales of the Bard 2: Demon's Law (1988) ISBN 0-7221-7776-3; ISBN 978-0-7221-7776-1
- Tales of the Bard 3: Death's Law (1989) ISBN 0-7221-7777-1; ISBN 978-0-7221-7777-8
- The Culai Heritage (collection of the Tales of the Bard novels, 2001) ISBN 1-892065-17-7; ISBN 978-1-892065-17-9
- The Arcana 1: Silverhand (with Morgan Llywelyn, 1996) ISBN 0-671-87714-3; ISBN 978-0-671-87714-9
- The Arcana 2: Silverlight (with Morgan Llywelyn, 1996) ISBN 0-671-87790-9; ISBN 978-0-671-87790-3
- The Arcana 3 (with Morgan Llywelyn) The projected third volume was never released and the series storyline never concluded.
- Etruscans (with Morgan Llywelyn, 2000) ISBN 0-312-86627-5; ISBN 978-0-312-86627-3
- The Thirteen Hallows (with Colette Freedman, 2011)

Folk Tales

- Irish Folk & Fairy Tales 1 (collection, 1983)
- Irish Folk & Fairy Tales 2 (collection, 1983) ISBN 0-7221-7640-6; ISBN 978-0-7221-7640-5
- Irish Folk & Fairy Tales 3 (collection, 1984) ISBN 0-7221-7641-4; ISBN 978-0-7221-7641-2
- Magical Irish Folk Tales (collection, 1985) ISBN 1-85635-110-6; ISBN 978-1-85635-110-2
- Irish Folk & Fairy Tales Omnibus (collection, 1989) ISBN 0-7515-0886-1; ISBN 978-0-7515-0886-4
- The Navigator (with Gloria Gaghan, a.k.a. The Voyage of St. Brendan, 1988) ISBN 0-413-17350-X; ISBN 978-0-413-17350-8
- River Gods (collection, 1991) ISBN 0-946887-21-7; ISBN 978-0-946887-21-7
- Irish Myths and Legends (collection, 1992) ISBN 0-7515-1242-7; ISBN 978-0-7515-1242-7
- Irish Ghosts & Hauntings (collection, 1994) ISBN 0-7515-0154-9; ISBN 978-0-7515-0154-4

Adventure

- The Quiz Master (2004) ISBN 1-904301-50-9; ISBN 978-1-904301-50-9

Science fiction

- The Merchant Prince (with Armin Shimerman, 2000) ISBN 0-671-03613-0; ISBN 978-0-671-03613-3

Non-fiction

- The Book of Celtic Wisdom (1999) ISBN 0-340-76563-1; ISBN 978-0-340-76563-0
- Celtic Wisdom for Business (2001) ISBN 0-7171-3174-2; ISBN 978-0-7171-3174-7
- Who Wants to Be A Millionaire? (2001) ISBN 0-7522-6141-X; ISBN 978-0-7522-6141-6
- Ireland (Photopocket) (2004) ISBN 3-8327-9001-2; ISBN 978-3-8327-9001-1

Illustrated

- Ireland — a Graphic History (graphic novel, with Morgan Llywelyn, illustrated by Eoin Coveney, 1995) ISBN 1-85230-627-0; ISBN 978-1-85230-627-4

=== As Anna Dillon ===
- Seasons (1988) ISBN 1-84223-126-X; ISBN 978-1-84223-126-5
- Another Time, Another Season (a.k.a. Another Season, 1989) ISBN 0-7474-0183-7; ISBN 978-0-7474-0183-4
- Season's End (1991) ISBN 0-7474-0658-8; ISBN 978-0-7474-0658-7
- Lottery (1993)
- Lies (1998) ISBN 1-873748-05-1; ISBN 978-1-873748-05-3
- The Affair (2004) ISBN 1-84223-204-5, ISBN 978-1-84223-204-0
- Consequences (2005) ISBN 1-84223-231-2; ISBN 978-1-84223-231-6

=== As editor ===
- Hall's Ireland (1984)
- An Irish Herbal (1986)

=== Contributions to other books ===
- The BFI Companion to Horror
- Ireland
- Making Contract
- Lifelines 3
- The Lion and the Unicorn
- Maths 100 Odyssey 1
- Maths 100 Odyssey 2
- Maths 100 Odyssey 3
- Irish Buildings
- Irish Pubs
- Irish Castles
- Ireland
- Ulster Medicine
- Trinity College Portfolio
