= House of Nicolas Flamel =

House in Paris, France

- Maison de Nicolas Flamel
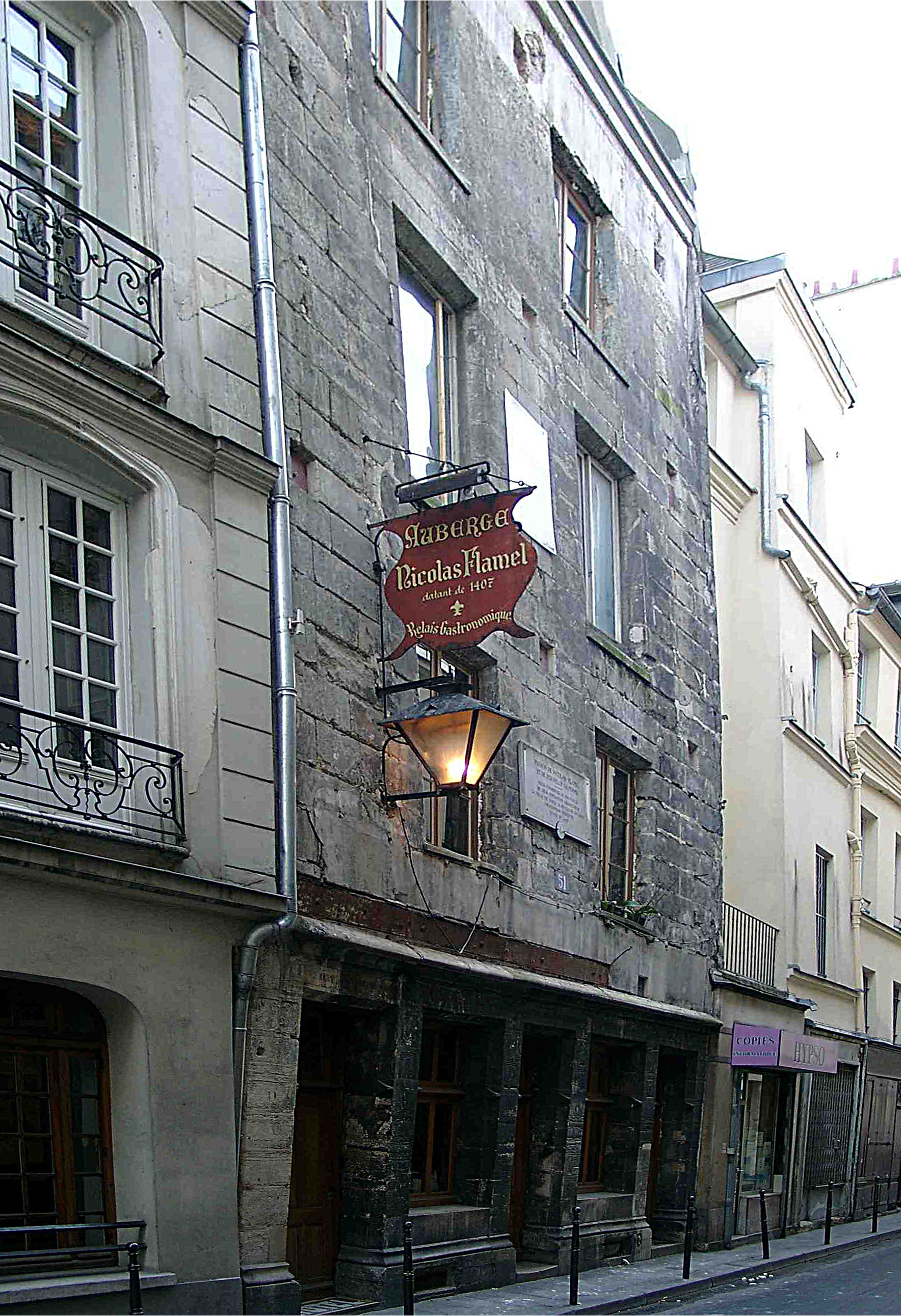
- Interactive map of the House of Nicolas Flamel area
- Former names: le Grand Pignon
- Alternative names: Auberge Nicolas Flamel

General information
- Location: 51, rue de Montmorency, Paris, France
- Coordinates: 48°51′49″N 2°21′11″E
- Named for: Nicolas Flamel
- Completed: 1407

Design and construction
- Designations: Monument historique

The house of Nicolas Flamel (French: maison de Nicolas Flamel; formerly in French: le Grand Pignon, lit. 'the Great Wimperg') is a house located at 51 rue de Montmorency in the 3rd arrondissement of Paris.

== History ==
Nicolas Flamel, a wealthy member of the Parisian bourgeoisie, commissioned the house after the death of his wife Pernelle in 1397, to accommodate the homeless. It was completed in 1407, as is inscribed on a frieze above the ground floor, and it is the best known and sole surviving of Flamel's houses, yet he actually never lived there. The house is probably the oldest in Paris.

The house's facade became a monument historique on 23 September 1911.

The building is currently used as a private home and a restaurant, the Auberge Nicolas Flamel.

== Description ==
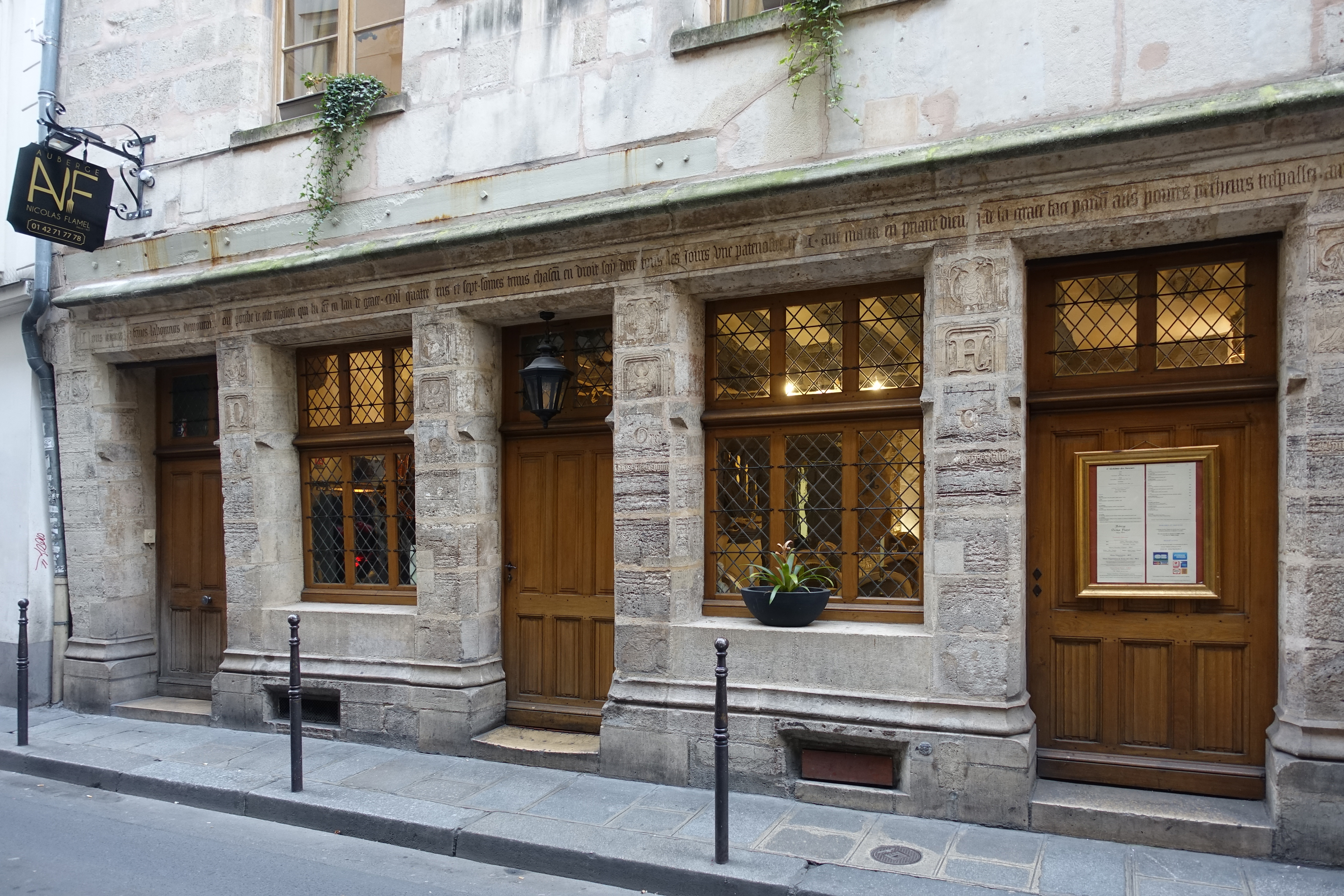

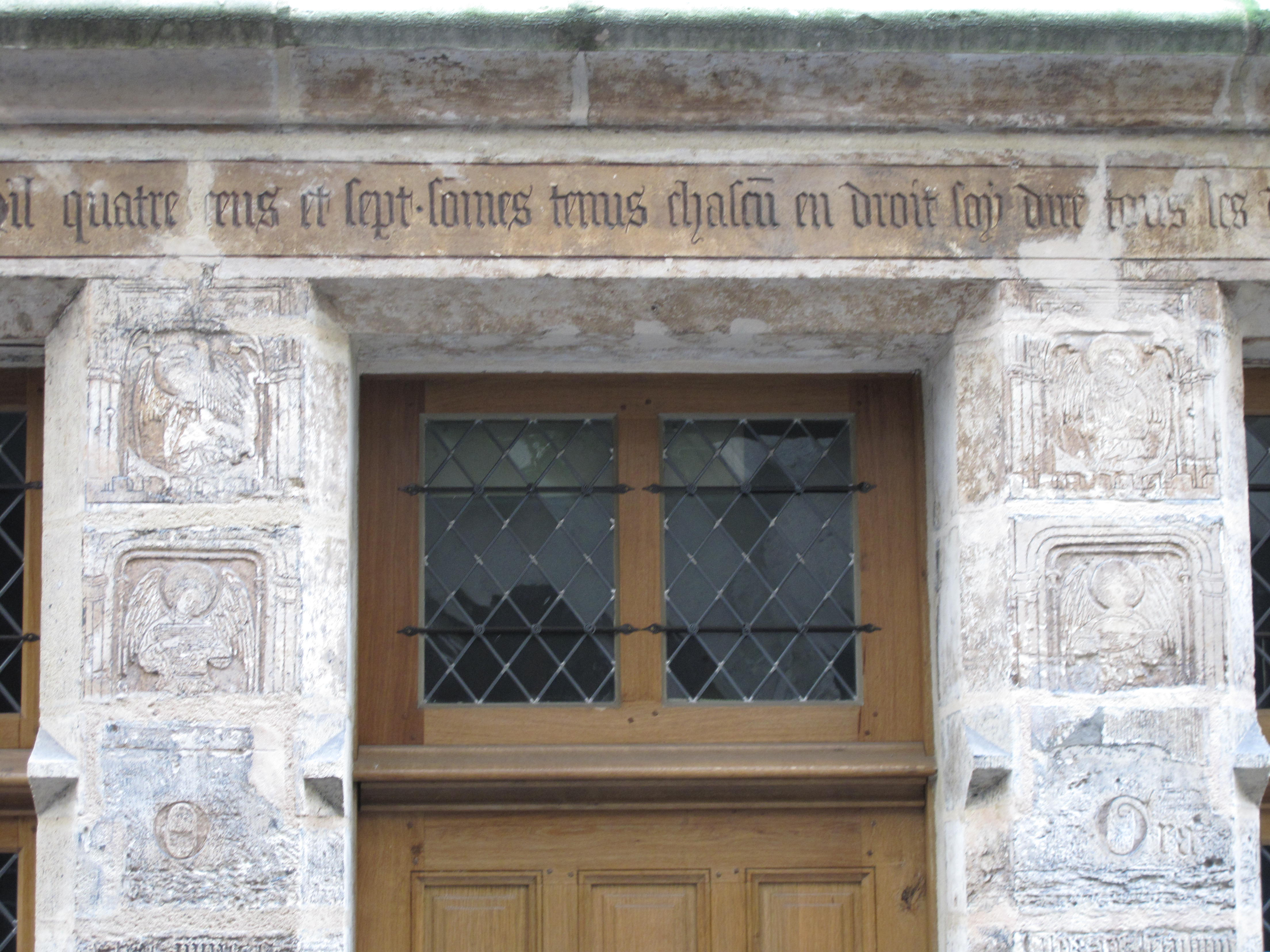
Ground-floor façade and a detailed view of its inscription and door jambs

The façade consists of four storeys and has been the subject of successive alterations, particularly during a restoration prior to the 1900 World Fair, when it lost the great wimperg (an ornamental gable) that had given it its name, and had its windows modified.

The ground-floor layout has been changed entirely except for the three front doors. In the past, both side doors granted access to shops, while the central door opened on circular stairs leading to the upper floors. The door jambs are decorated with sculptures framed in basket-handle arches, which depict characters holding phylacteries or sitting in gardens. The central door is framed by four musician angels. Two door jambs feature Nicolas Flamel's initials.

Just below the ground floor cornice is a Middle French inscription:

Nous homes et femes laboureurs demourans ou porche de ceste maison qui fut faite en l'an de grâce mil quatre cens et sept somes tenus chascun en droit soy dire tous les jours une paternostre et un ave maria en priant Dieu que sa grâce face pardon aus povres pescheurs trespasses Amen

Translation:

We, men and women, workers living in the porches of this house that was made in the year of grace one thousand four hundred and seven are, each of us, required by law to say every day one Our Father and one Hail Mary while praying to God that his grace brings forgiveness to the poor deceased sinners, amen.

== See also ==
- List of monuments historiques in Paris

== Notes and references ==
=== Bibliography ===
- Brut, Catherine; Weiss, Valentine (September–October 2015). "La maison de Nicolas Flamel. La plus ancienne demeure conservée de Paris". Dossiers d'Archéologie (in French). 371: 50–54.
