= Areop-Enap =

Figure in Nauru creation myths

Areop-Enap (Nauruan: old spider) played a major part in the creation of the world in the indigenous myths of the people of Nauru.

== Creation myth ==
At the beginning of creation, the only things in existence were Areop-Enap (a spider) and the sea. Areop-Enap searched for food in the darkness and found an enormous clam (in some accounts a Tridacna clam). Before he could stun it, the clam swallowed him and snapped shut again. In the darkness, Areop-Enap explored the clam's insides, and found a tiny snail (or in some accounts, a Triton's Horn shellfish).

Areop-Enap placed the snail under his arm and lay down and slept for three days, directing some of his power to the snail. Then he found a second, larger snail which he placed under his arm and again slept for three days, transferring some of his power to the snail. On waking, Areop-Enap asked the smaller snail to climb to the hinge of the shell and pry the clam open. As the snail moved across the clam's flesh, it left a phosphorescent trail, in the light of which Areop-Enap saw a white worm (or in some accounts, a caterpillar) called Rigi. Ignoring the snail, Areop-Enap cast a strength spell on Rigi and persuaded him to try to open the clam.

Time and again Rigi set his head against the upper shell and his tail against the lower shell, and heaved. The clam resisted and sweat poured from Rigi, making a pool in the lower shell, then a lake and finally a sea. The saltiness of the water killed the clam and opened the shell. Areop-Enap made the lower shell into Earth and the upper shell into the sky and set the smaller snail west of the sky-shell where it became the Moon. The second snail was set to the east and became the Sun. Areop-Enap made islands from clam-flesh and clothed them in vegetation made from his own web-thread. Finally he turned to Rigi and found that he had drowned in his own sweat, killed by his own exertions. Areop-Enap wrapped him in a cocoon of silk and hung him in the sky to become the Milky Way.

Areop-Enap created humans from stones so they could support the sky, and then discovered there were other creatures in the newly created world. So he created a winged creature or flying bird from the dirt under his nails and set it to annoy the creatures so that they called to each other to kill it. In this way Areop-Enap learned the names of the inhabitants of the world.

== See also ==
- Creation myth
