= Perenelle Flamel =

Wife of the 14th-century scribe Nicolas Flamel

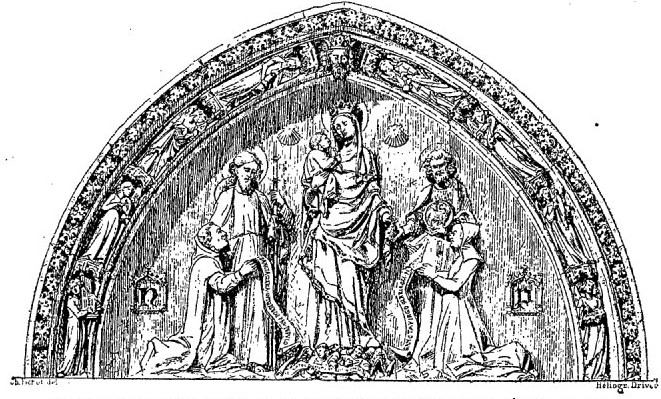
Portal of the church of Saint Jacques de la Boucherie, funded by Nicolas and Perrenelle Flamel in 1389, on which they are both depicted (kneeling down at left and right)

Perenelle Flamel (October 13, 1320 – 1397) was the wife of the famous 14th-century scribe Nicolas Flamel. She was a generous benefactress who invested her wealth in churches and hostels and commissioned religious sculptures. Due to legends which first appeared in the 17th century, she has since developed a reputation as a successful alchemist. Like her husband, Perenelle has had a street in Paris, France named after her, Rue Pernelle.

== Life ==
There are few confirmed details about Perenelle's place of birth and early life. Perenelle married Nicolas in 1368. She had two previous husbands and brought their fortune to the marriage. The couple remained childless.

She and her husband were devout Roman Catholics. The couple contributed to the church by commissioning several sculptures. Nicolas continued this practice after his wife's death. The couple is depicted on the portal of the Chapel of St. James of the Boucherie praying at the feet of St. John, a sculpture which they financed in 1389. They owned several properties and contributed to the building of poor houses.

The spelling of her name varies and is sometimes given as Perrenelle, Petronelle or Pernelle. There is no historical record indicating that she or her husband were the successful alchemists of later legend.

== Death ==
Perenelle died in 1397. She left her husband a sum of 5,300 Tours pounds. This sum was then contested in court by her sister and brother-in-law. The sister won the amounts left to Flamel.

== Reputation as an alchemist ==
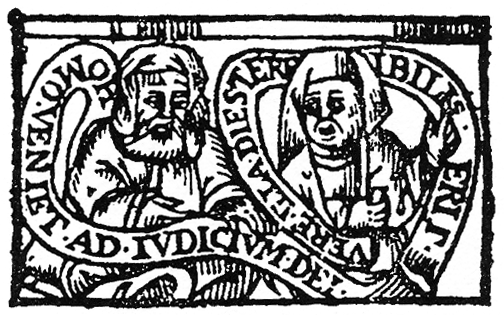
Woodcut from the Booke of Hieroglyphicall Figures, given as a representation of Nicolas and Perenelle Flamel

Perenelle's reputation as an alchemist stems from a book written in 1612, allegedly authored by her husband. However, Nicolas' reputation as an author and immortal alchemical adept is an invention of the 17th century. Perenelle figures prominently in the introduction of this Booke of Hieroglyphicall Figures, where the character of Nicolas outlines his quest for the philosopher's stone. In this story, Perenelle witnesses alchemical projections and aids in chrysopoeia (gold-making).

== Perenelle in fiction ==
Perenelle's posthumous reputation as an alchemist has led to her portrayal in fantasy fiction alongside her husband.

- She is mentioned briefly in Harry Potter and the Philosopher's Stone by J. K. Rowling, though neither she nor her husband actually appears.
- Perenelle and Nicolas Flamel are central characters in The Secrets of the Immortal Nicholas Flamel, a series of six fantasy novels written by Michael Scott.
- Stephen Leigh took the mystery surrounding the Flamels and wrote Immortal Muse.
- She appears as a character in a crossover story between Will Eisner's The Spirit and Chester Gould's Dick Tracy in the long-running Dick Tracy comic strip.
- In several entries in the Puella Magi Madoka Magica Anime franchise, Perenelle appears as a rare example of an adult Puella Magi. Her most prominent appearance is in the Manga spin-off Puella Magi Tart Magica, which is set during the Hundred Years' War.
- Perenelle appears as a main character in the vampire/comedy film, The Old Blood: Flamel's Legacy in which she uses a tincture of Philosopher's Stone to artificially sustain a group of vampires.
- In the Harry Potter fan fiction Harry Potter and the Methods of Rationality by Eliezer Yudkowsky, Nicolas Flamel is supposedly Perenelle's alter ego when using the Philosopher's Stone to shapeshift, though this claim's truth is left ambiguous.
- In the Accidental Alchemist book series by Gigi Pandian, she appears in multiple books as a motherly figure to Zoe Faust, who became the "Accidental Alchemist " under their tutoring.
