= Nicolas Flamel =

French public scribe (c. 1340–1418)

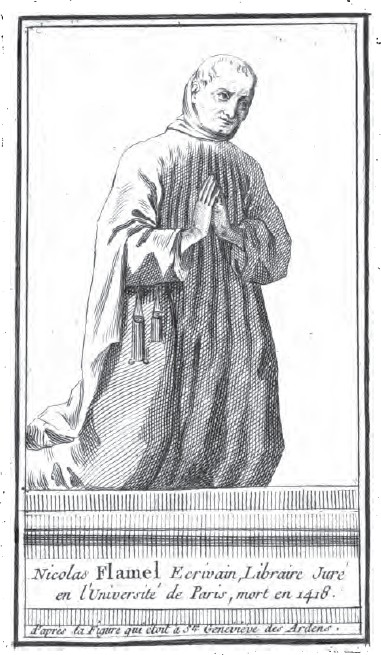
- Flamel as represented in 1402 on the portal of Sainte-Geneviève des Ardens (from Étienne François Villain, 1761)
- Born: c. 1340; Pontoise, France
- Died: 22 March 1418 (aged c. 77–78); Paris, France
- Spouse: Perenelle Flamel (m. 1368; died 1397)

Nicolas Flamel (French: [nikɔla flamɛl]; c. 1340 – 22 March 1418) was a French écrivain public, a draftsman of public documents such as contracts, letters, agreements and requests, at a time when few people could write and read. He and his wife also ran a school that taught this trade.

Long after his death, Flamel developed a reputation as an alchemist thought to have created and discovered the philosopher's stone and to have thereby achieved immortality. These legendary accounts first appeared in the 17th century. According to texts ascribed to Flamel almost 200 years after his death, he had learned alchemical secrets from a Jewish converso on the road to Santiago de Compostela. He has since appeared as a legendary alchemist in various fictional works.

In modern historical publications Flamel is also often referred to as a copyist of manuscripts and a book seller, but research by M. and R. Rouse has demonstrated that this is not correct and that the very few historical documents that refer to him in this capacity do so mistakenly or are later forgeries.

== Life ==
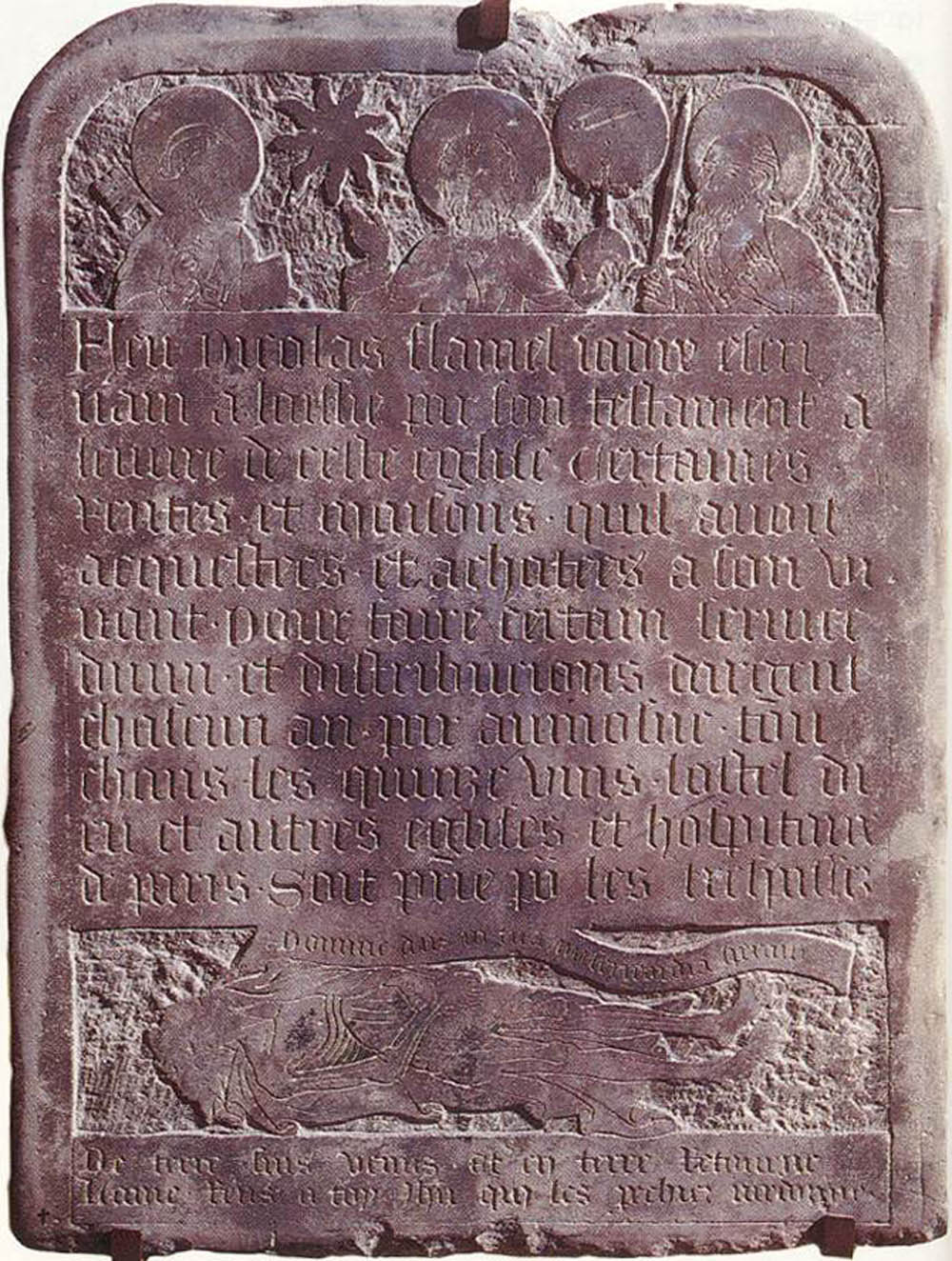
Tombstone of Nicolas Flamel, 1418. Musée de Cluny, Paris.

The historical Flamel lived in Paris in the 14th and 15th centuries, and his life is well documented thanks to many surviving sources that mention him. He ran two shops as a scribe and married Perenelle before 1373. She brought the wealth of two previous husbands to the marriage. The couple owned several properties and contributed financially to churches, sometimes by commissioning sculptures. Later in life, they were noted for their wealth and philanthropy.

Flamel lived into his 80s, and in 1410 designed his own tombstone, which was carved with the images of Jesus Christ, Saint Peter and Saint Paul. The tombstone is preserved at the Musée de Cluny in Paris. Records show that Flamel died in 1418. He was buried in Paris at the end of the nave of the former Church of Saint-Jacques-de-la-Boucherie. His will, dated 22 November 1416, indicates that he was generous but that he did not have the extraordinary wealth of later alchemical legend. There is no indication that the real Flamel of history was involved in alchemy, pharmacy or medicine.

Flamel was a real person, and he may have dabbled in alchemy, but his reputation as an author and immortal adept must be accepted as an invention of the seventeenth century.

== House in Paris ==
One of Flamel's houses still stands in Paris, at 51 rue de Montmorency. It is the oldest stone house in the city. There is an old inscription on the wall, which states, "We, plowmen and women living at the porch of this house, built in 1407, are requested to say every day an 'Our Father' and an 'Ave Maria' praying God that His grace forgive poor and dead sinners." As of 2008, the ground floor housed a restaurant. A Paris street near the Tour Saint-Jacques, the rue Nicolas Flamel, has been named after him; it intersects with the rue Pernelle, named after his wife.

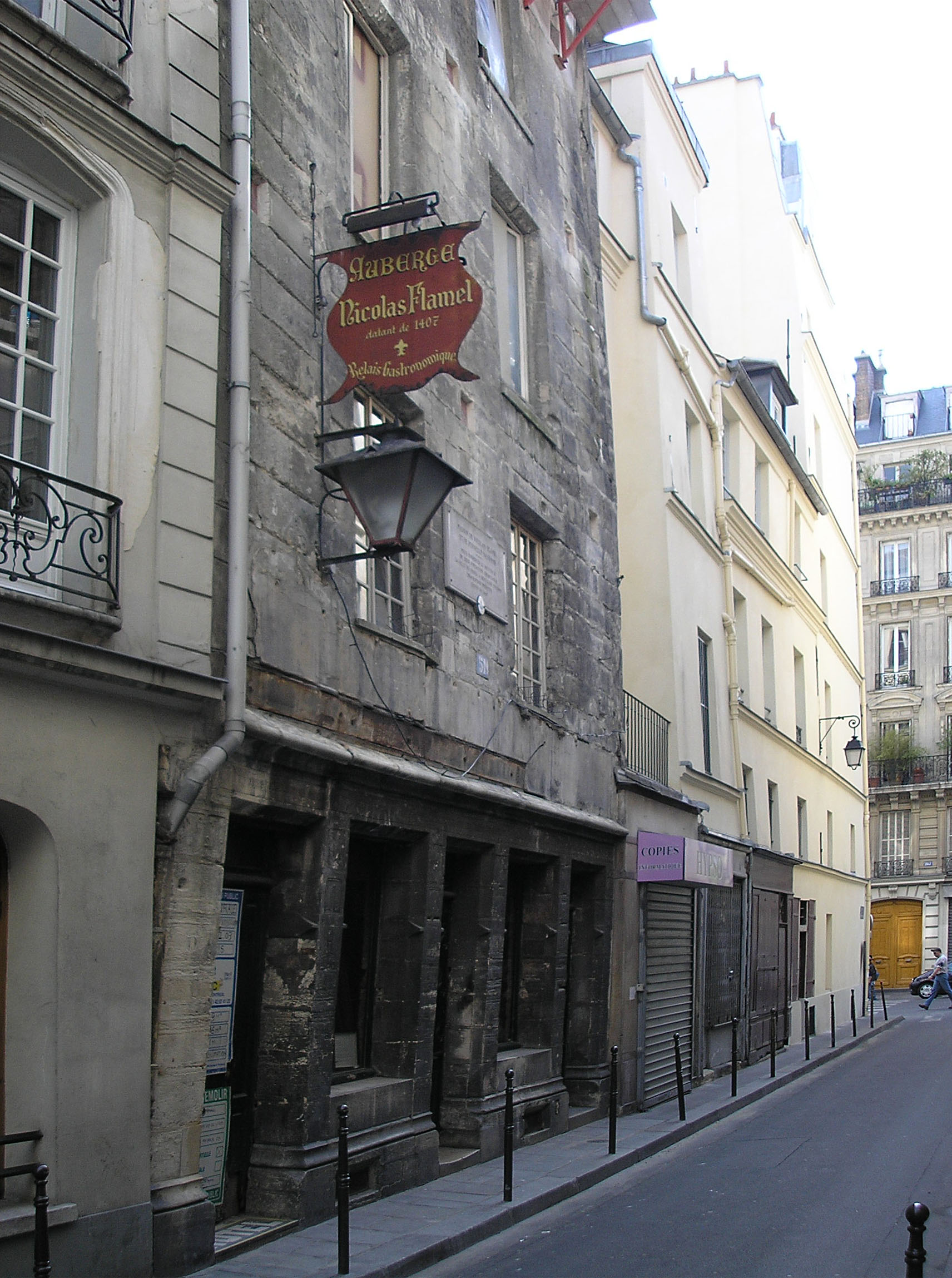
Flamel's Paris home, now a restaurant

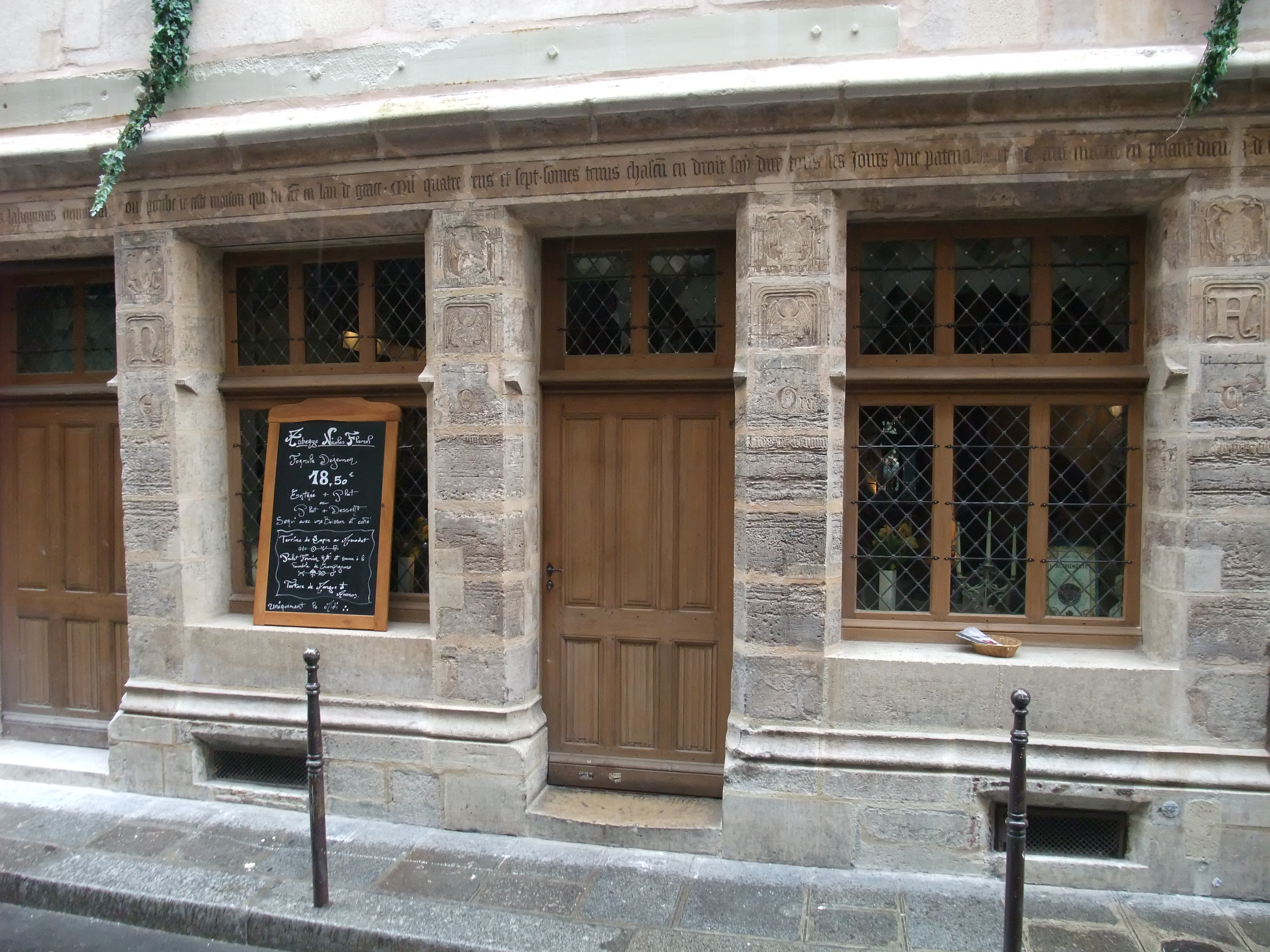
A closer shot of the Auberge Nicolas Flamel, June 2008

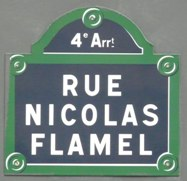
Rue Nicolas Flamel street sign in Paris

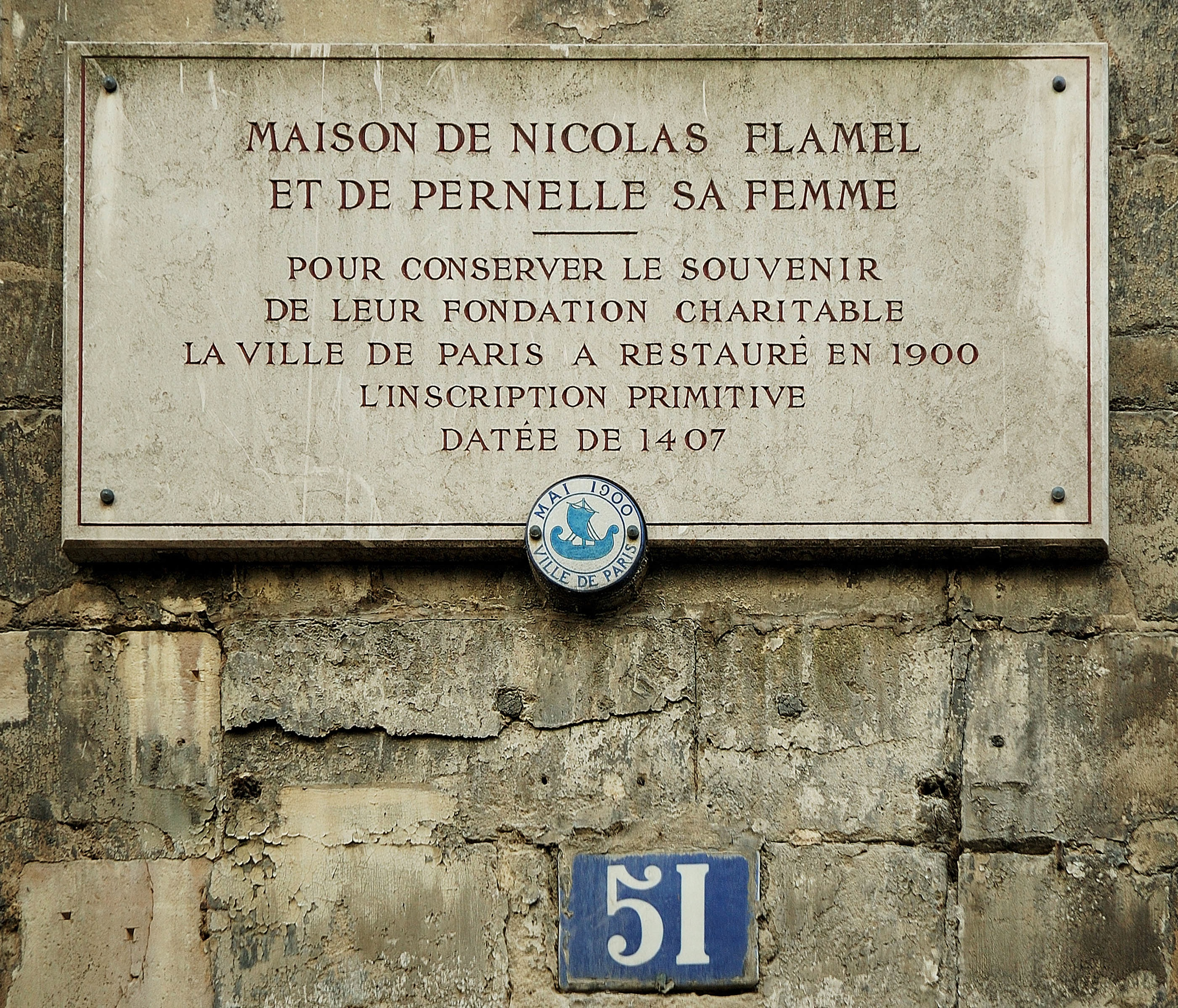
Plaque on home

== Posthumous reputation as an alchemist ==
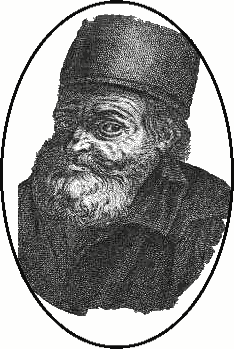
This imaginative portrait of Nicolas Flamel dates from the 19th century.

Legendary accounts of Flamel's life are based on 17th-century works, primarily Livre des figures hiéroglyphiques. The essence of his reputation are claims that he succeeded at the two goals of alchemy: that he made the philosopher's stone, which turns base metals into gold, and that he and his wife, Perenelle, achieved immortality through the "Elixir of Life".

An alchemical book, published in Paris in 1612 as Livre des figures hiéroglyphiques and in London in 1624 as Exposition of the Hieroglyphical Figures was attributed to Flamel. It is a collection of designs purportedly commissioned by Flamel for a tympanum at the Cimetière des Innocents in Paris, long disappeared at the time the work was published. In the publisher's introduction, Flamel's search for the philosopher's stone was described. According to that introduction, Flamel had made it his life's work to understand the text of a mysterious 21-page book he had purchased in 1357, at the cost of two florins. The introduction claims that, around 1378, he traveled to Spain for assistance with translation. On the way back, he reported that he met a sage, who identified Flamel's book as being a copy of the original The Book of Abraham the Jew. With this knowledge, over the next few years, Flamel and his wife allegedly decoded enough of the book to successfully replicate its recipe for the philosopher's stone, producing first silver in 1382 and then gold. Also, Flamel is said to have studied some texts in Hebrew.

The validity of this story was first questioned in 1761 by Etienne Villain. He claimed that the source of the Flamel legend was P. Arnauld de la Chevalerie, publisher of Exposition of the Hieroglyphical Figures, who wrote the book under the pseudonym Eiranaeus Orandus. Other writers have defended the legendary account of Flamel's life, which has been embellished by stories of sightings in the 17th and 18th centuries and expanded in fictitious works ever since.

Flamel had achieved legendary status within the circles of alchemy by the mid 17th century, with references in Isaac Newton's journals to "the Caduceus, the Dragons of Flammel". Interest in Flamel revived in the 19th century: Victor Hugo mentioned him in The Hunchback of Notre-Dame, Erik Satie was intrigued by Flamel, and Albert Pike refers to Nicholas Flamel in his book Morals and Dogma of the Scottish Rite of Freemasonry. Flamel's reputation as an alchemist was further bolstered in the late 20th century by his depiction as the creator of the titular alchemical substance in the best-selling novel Harry Potter and the Philosopher's Stone and its film adaptation. He also appears in the 2018 spinoff film Fantastic Beasts: The Crimes of Grindelwald, where he is portrayed by Brontis Jodorowsky. He is due to appear in the upcoming Harry Potter TV series, where he will be portrayed by Lambert Wilson.

=== Works ascribed to Flamel ===
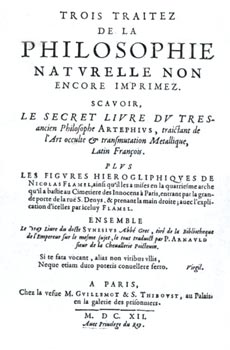
First-edition cover of the book of the hieroglyphic figures, not published until 1612

- Le Livre des figures hiéroglyphiques (The Book of hieroglyphic figures), first published in Trois traictez de la philosophie naturelle, Paris, Veuve Guillemot, 1612
- Le sommaire philosophique (The Philosophical summary), first published in De la transformation métallique, Paris, Guillaume Guillard, 1561
- Le Livre des laveures (The Book of washing), manuscript BnF MS. Français 19978
- Le Bréviaire de Flamel (Flamel's breviary), manuscript BnF MS. Français 14765

== In popular culture ==
- Flamel has been portrayed in popular fiction as a legendary figure who holds the key to immortality or the philosopher's stone.
  - In Victor Hugo's novel Notre Dame de Paris (1831), the tragic main character Claude Frollo is a young priest and alchemist who spends much of his time studying the carvings in Les Innocents, trying to fathom Flamel's secrets.
  - In the tale "Empty Bottles" of the book Twilight Land by Howard Pyle
  - In Harry Potter and Fantastic Beasts (1997–2022)
  - Fullmetal Alchemist (2001–2010)
  - The Secrets of the Immortal Nicholas Flamel (2007–2012)
  - As Above, So Below (2014)
- In Dan Brown's novel The Da Vinci Code as one of the members of the Priory of Sion.
- The works of Nicolas Flamel are central to several missions found in the 2014 video game Assassin's Creed: Unity.
- Nicolas Flamel has also appeared in the video game Steelrising with regards to his legendary Philosopher Stone.
- Nicolas Flamel has also appeared in the video game Full Metal Daemon: Muramasa, sharing his knowledge and the Philosopher Stone.
- Nicolas Flamel was also mentioned in the television series The Librarians being referenced as an immortal being that was able to be injured but could not die.
- Nicolas Flamel was also mentioned in the sequel television series The Librarians: The Next Chapter being referenced as the author of the fictional work "Creatures of the Night".
- Nicolas Flamel was also mentioned in Arturo Pérez-Reverte's novel The Club Dumas Though, he is most known for being portrayed in Harry Potter and the Philosopher's Stone

== See also ==
- List of alchemists
