= Emil Fröschels =

Austrian speech therapist

- Born: August 24, 1884; Vienna, Austria-Hungary
- Died: January 18, 1972 (aged 87); New York City
- Education: University of Vienna
- Occupations: Laryngologist; Speech therapist; Lecturer of otology
- Organizations: St. Anna Kinderspital (of the Vienna University); Physiological Institute (same); Central Institute for the Deaf (Washington University in St. Louis); Mount Sinai Hospital; Beth David Hospital; Pace College; Alfred Adler Institute

Emil Fröschels (August 24, 1884 – January 18, 1972) was an Austrian speech and voice therapy specialist. As a laryngologist and chief speech therapist, in 1924 he introduced the term logopedics, i.e., speech therapy, into medical usage. He established the International Society of Logopedics and Phoniatrics and was a co-founder, with Karl Cornelius Rothe, of the Vienna School for Speech-Disturbed Children.

== Life ==
Fröschels was born in Vienna in what was then Austria-Hungary. He graduated in 1902 from the State Gymnasium in the city's 6th District and then studied medicine at the University of Vienna. He worked from 1905 to 1908 at the St. Anna Children's Hospital of the University of Vienna and was a guest student at the Institute of Chemistry. In 1907 he received his doctorate, and in 1908 he began to work at the otological clinic (Ohrenklinik, literally: ear clinic) of the University of Vienna under the direction of Viktor Urbantschitsch, because he had the intention of becoming an audiologist. He had to drop this intention, however, because his depth perception was not sufficient for otoscopy. He turned to the voice and speech disorders, and went to Hermann Gutzmann Sr. in Berlin and, on his return to Vienna in 1909, opened an outpatient clinic for speech disorders at the Ohrenklinik, which he led for many years. In 1914 he was habilitated as a lecturer in otology. During World War I, he was chief physician of the head injuries and speech disorders department of the Vienna Garrison Hospital.

After the war, Fröschels worked until 1926 at the Ohrenklinik then led by Heinrich Neumann von Héthárs and was at the same time assistant for phonetics at the Physiological Institute. In 1920, together with colleagues and educators, he set up a language welfare center for schoolchildren in the city of Vienna. In 1921, he and Karl Cornelius Rothe first organized special courses in voice and speech therapy for educators in Vienna and founded the Vienna School for Speech-Disturbed Children.

In 1924 Fröschels founded the International Association of Logopedics and Phoniatrics (IALP), which he chaired from 1924 to 1953. He taught voice and voice therapy at the teacher training institute and at the conservatory. He was a member of the Association for Psychiatry and Neurology, President of the Austrian Society for Abnormal Child Psychology and from 1926 to 1938 president of the Austrian Society for Experimental Phonetics. He was involved in the Association for Individual Psychology in educational counseling and founded in 1926 an individual psychological outpatient clinic for speech disorders at the Polyclinic, which he directed in collaboration with Alfred Adler and Leopold Stein. In 1927 he was appointed associate professor at the University of Vienna.

After Austria's annexation by Germany in the Anschluss, Fröschels was forcibly suspended on account of his Jewish origin and lost his venia legendi (status as a lecturer). In 1939 he emigrated to the United States, where he found a position as a research professor of speech disorders at the Central Institute for the Deaf, led by Max A. Goldstein, at Washington University School of Medicine. From 1940 to 1949 he was founder and director at the Speech and Language Clinic at Mount Sinai Hospital and from 1950 to 1955 at the Beth David Hospital in New York. From 1947 he was president of the New York Society of Speech and Voice Therapy. He taught at Pace College in New York and became in 1955 the first director of the Alfred Adler Institute in New York.

Fröschels died in New York in 1972.

== Work ==
Fröschels is next to Hermann Gutzmann Sr. as a pioneer of modern language research and founder of speech therapy. In 1909 he published a lecture on the nature and treatment of speech disorders. In 1913 he published his textbook of speech and voice, which contributed to the recognition of voice and voice therapy in medicine with the works of Gutzmann. His research was devoted to the psychological causes of various language and speech disorders. He attributed stuttering to mental, not innate causes. He developed a therapy for stutterers, for whom he thought the typical spasms could be solved by chewing movements while speaking and at the same time stimulating the various muscles of the vocal tract. Therapists support this process, in the sense of individual psychology, by words of encouragement. He was also involved in the invention of Fröschel-Scholit prosthesis for correcting cleft palate.

Fröschels wrote 23 books and about 300 articles on speech disorders, psychotherapy, and philosophical issues, and was a member of the American Speech Correction Association, the Association for the Advancement of Psychotherapy, the Rudolf Virchow Society, and others.

== Awards ==
In 1961, Fröschels received the Austrian Cross of Honor for Science and Art First Class from the Austrian Government for his services in the field of science and art. He was supported by the International Association of Logopedics and Phoniatrics (IALP) to be made an honorary member.

== Selected works ==
- Lehrbuch der Sprachheilkunde (Logopädie) für Aerzte, Pädagogen und Studierende (Textbook of Speech Therapy for Physicians, Educators and Students). Verlag Deuticke, Leipzig/Vienna 1913
- Hilfsbuch für die Behandlung von Sprachstörungen (Handbook for the Treatment of Speech Disorders). Perles Verlag, Vienna 1916
- Ratschläge für die Erziehung kleiner Kinder (Advice for the Education of Small Children). Perles Verlag, Vienna 1916
- Kindersprache und Aphasie: Gedanken zur Aphasielehre auf Grund von Beobachtungen der kindlichen Sprachentwicklung und ihrer Anomalien unter Berücksichtigung der modernen Psychologie (Child Language and Aphasia: Thoughts on Aphasia Theory Based on Observations of Infantile Language Development and Its Anomalies, Taking into Account Modern Psychology). Karger Verlag, Berlin 1918
- Die sprachärztliche Therapie im Kriege (Linguistic Therapy in War). Verlag Urban & Schwarzenberg, Berlin/Vienna 1919
- Singen und Sprechen: Ihre Anatomie, Physiologie, Pathologie und Hygiene (Singing and Speaking: Your Anatomy, Physiology, Pathology and Hygiene). Verlag Deuticke, Leipzig/Vienna 1920
- Psychologie der Sprache (Psychology of Language). Verlag F. Deuticke, Vienna 1925
- Das Stottern (assoziative Aphasie) (Stuttering (Associative Aphasia)). Verlag F. Deuticke, Vienna 1925
- Stimme und Sprache in der Heilpädagogik (Voice and Language in Special Education). Verlag C. Marhold Halle a. S.
- Sprach- und Stimmstörungen (Stammeln, Stottern usw.) (Speech and Voice Disorders (Stammering, Stuttering, etc.)). Verlag Julius Springer, Berlin 1929
- Methoden zur Untersuchung der Sinnesorgane (Methods for the Examination of the Sense Organs). Verlag Urban & Schwarzenberg, Berlin/Vienna 1920–1937 (5 Bände)
- Angst: eine philosophisch-medizinische Betrachtung (Fear: A Philosophical-Medical View). Verlag Karger, Basel 1950

== Literature ==
- Alexandra Adler: Emil Fröschels (1884–1972). JIP 28/1, 1972
- M. Klang (ed.): Die Geistige Elite Österreichs. Ein Handbuch der Führenden in Kultur und Wissenschaft 1816–1936 (The Spiritual Elite of Austria: A Handbook of Leaders in Culture and Science 1816–1936). Wien, 1936
- K. Mühlberger: Vertriebene Intelligenz 1938. Der Verlust geistiger und menschlicher Potenz an der Universität Wien von 1938 bis 1945 (Displaced Intelligence 1938: The Loss of Intellectual and Human Power at the University of Vienna from 1938 to 1945). Universität Wien 1993
- Clara Kenner: Der zerrissene Himmel: Emigration und Exil der Wiener Individualpsychologie (The Torn Sky: Emigration and Exile of Viennese Individual Psychology). Verlag Vandenhoeck & Ruprecht, Göttingen 2007, ISBN 3-525-45320-5
- Emil Fröschels, in: Judith Bauer-Merinsky: Die Auswirkungen der Annexion Österreichs durch das Deutsche Reich auf die medizinische Fakultät der Universität Wien im Jahre 1938: Biographien entlassener Professoren und Dozenten (The Effects of the Annexation of Austria by the German Reich on the Medical Faculty of the University of Vienna in 1938: Biographies of Dismissed Professors and Lecturers). Wien: Diss., 1980, S. 66–68b.
