= Box office =

Office selling event tickets

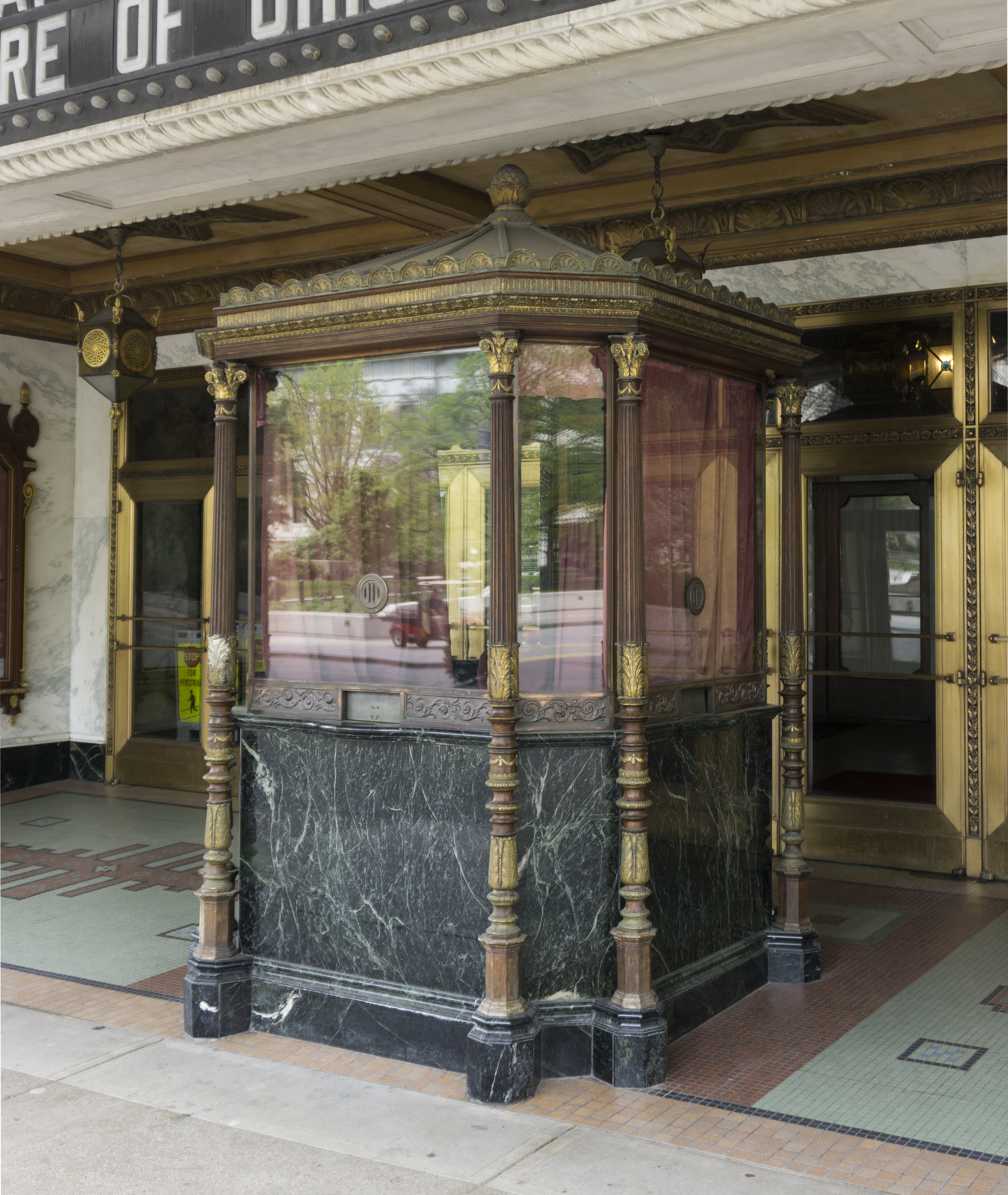
Box office at the Ohio Theatre in Columbus, Ohio

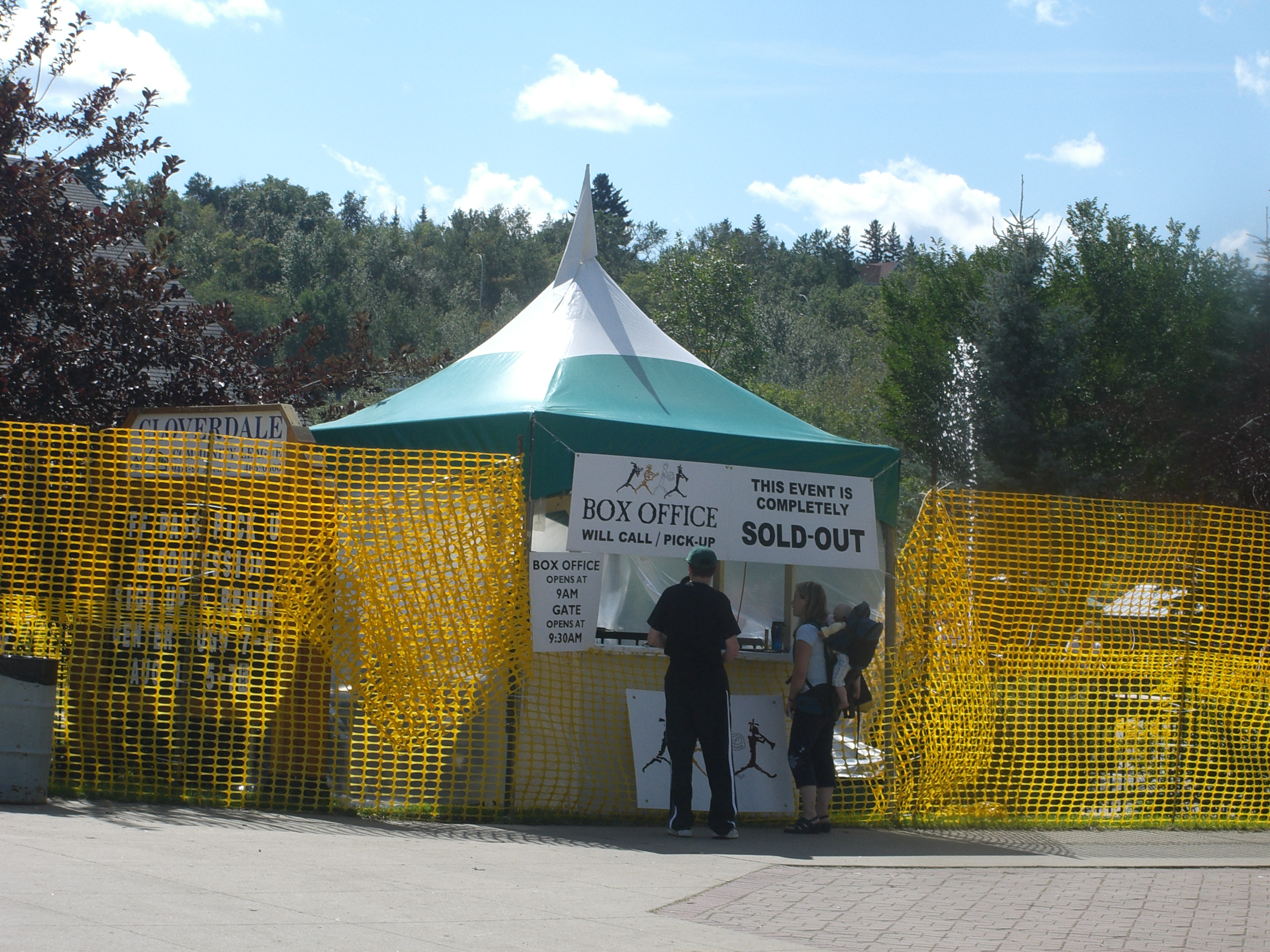
Folk festival box office in Edmonton, Alberta

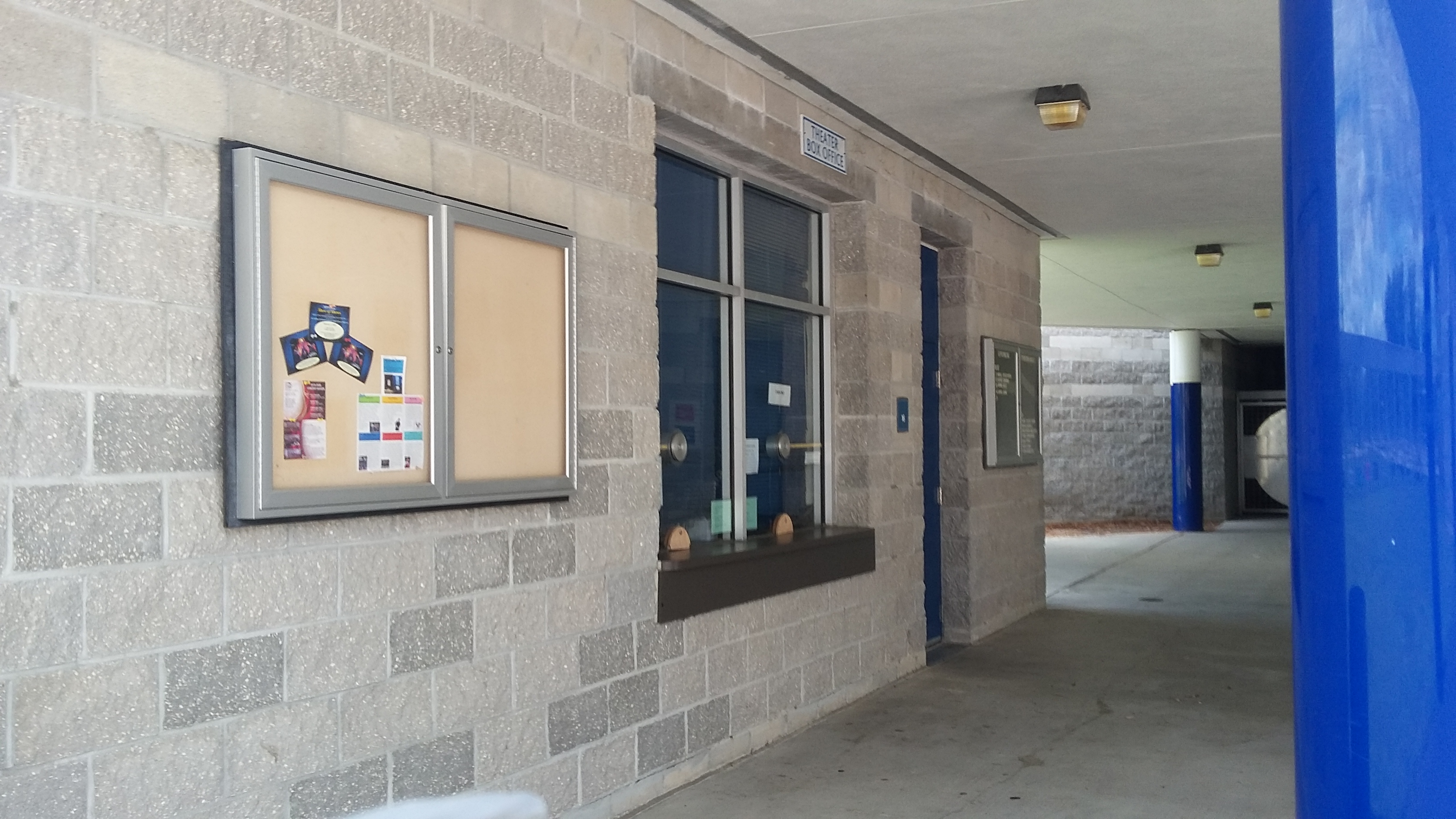
Ticket window at North Port High School Performing Arts Center

A box office or ticket office is a place where tickets are sold to the public for admission to an event. Patrons can perform the transaction at a countertop, through a hole in a wall or window, or at a wicket. By extension, the term is frequently used, especially in the context of the film industry, as a metonym for the amount of business a particular production, such as a film or theatre show, receives. The term is also used to refer to a ticket office at an arena or a stadium.

== Etymology ==
Ceramic money boxes were used at the sixteenth-century Globe Theatre, Curtain Theatre and Rose Theatre in London, where many examples have been found during archaeological investigations. They were possibly used by the "gatherer" at the entrance to the theatres, who collected the admission money. There is disagreement, however, around whether the term originates from this time, as the objects could have been carried by the many snack-sellers attending the audiences; they too needed a convenient and secure way to collect their customers' cash. (Note: Thomas Dekker, in his The Gull's Horn Book of 1609, is the first on record to use box in the theatrical sense. He described boxes as: crammed spaces "in the suburbs of the stage" from which to watch a performance.)

There is no record of the term "box office" being used until the eighteenth century: it was being used from at least 1741, deriving from the office from which tickets for theatre boxes were sold. This is the derivation favoured by the Oxford English Dictionary.

== Related terminology ==
Total movie ticket sales were being termed box office from at least 1904.
