= Stenger =

Stenger is a surname. Notable people with the surname include:

- Bep Stenger (1922–2016), Dutch aid worker and resistance member
- Brian Stenger (born 1947), American football player
- Carl Stenger (1905–1982), German German politician and trade unionist
- Georg Stenger (born 1957), German philosopher
- Harvey G. Stenger, American educator and academic administrator
- Jaap Stenger (1907–1992), Dutch rower
- Michael C. Stenger (1950–2022), 41st Sergeant at Arms of the United States Senate
- Nicole Stenger (born 1950), French artist
- Ricka Stenger (born 1979), Danish Paralympic swimmer
- Steve Stenger, American attorney
- Victor J. Stenger (1935–2014), American particle physicist
- William Stenger (1840–1918), American politician

== See also ==
- Stengers
