= TWJ =

TWJ can refer to

- TWJ Foundation, a United Kingdom-based charity
- T. W. Josey High School, Augusta, Georgia, United States
- Timothy Woodward Jr., an American director, actor and producer
