= Stengers =

Stengers is a surname. Notable people with the surname include:

- Isabelle Stengers (born 1949), Belgian philosopher
- Jean Stengers (1922–2002), Belgian historian

== See also ==
- Stenger
- Stenvers
