= Max A. Goldstein =

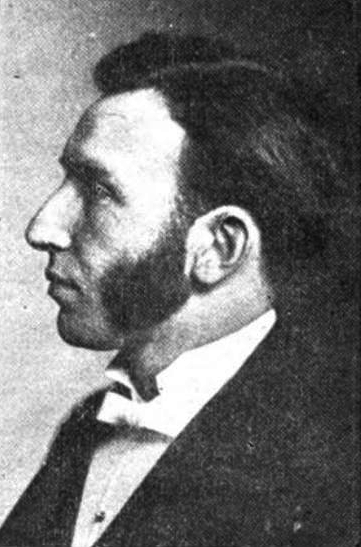
- Born: Max Aaron Goldstein; April 19, 1870; St. Louis, Missouri
- Died: July 27, 1941 (aged 71); Frankfort, Michigan
- Burial place: New Mount Sinai Cemetery
- Education: Missouri Medical College
- Occupations: Otolaryngologist, educator

Max Aaron Goldstein (April 19, 1870 – July 27, 1941) was best known for founding the Central Institute for the Deaf, his extensive study of ear, nose, and throat medicine, and for pioneering an "oral" approach to educating the deaf in the U.S. His parents, William and Hulda Goldstein, had immigrated to New Orleans from Germany prior his birth, but moved further inland to Missouri due to fear of the yellow fever outbreak occurring at the time in the southern United States.

== Biography ==
Max A. Goldstein was born in St. Louis on April 19, 1870. At age 22, he graduated from Missouri Medical College (now Washington University School of Medicine) then served a one-year internship at the St. Louis City Hospital. Following his internship and university education, he continued on to specialty training in otolaryngology in London Berlin, Strasbourg, and Vienna throughout 1894 and 1895.

One of Goldstein's "most formative experiences abroad" was his opportunity to work with Adam Politzer and Victor Urbantschitsch at their clinic in Vienna. It is apparent that Goldstein's work throughout his career was inspired heavily by these two individuals, as throughout the subsequent decades he would continue to return to this clinic and "share his experiences in America and continue to learn from his European colleagues." Much of his work would later build upon the base research that these two had begun.

Goldstein would return to America, and in 1895 marry Leonore Weiner shortly before opening his own private practice in St. Louis, MO. That same year he would also be appointed to the Chair of Otology at Beaumont Medical College (now known as Saint Louis University) and begin his bi-weekly visits to the Sisters of Saint Joseph School for the Deaf. During these visits, he would apply his researched methods of deaf education. Goldstein would instruct "each of the 16 students ranging in age from 6 to 18 years for 15 minutes each" and would also spend time with the teachers to educate them on the details of the acoustic stimulation method. In 1896, the same year as the birth of his only daughter, he would found one of his lifelong works; a medical journal dubbed The Laryngoscope, "in an effort to speed the dissemination of the rapidly expanding body of knowledge in otolaryngology". Goldstein would contribute to this ever-expanding journal until his death in 1941. By 1901 he had published eight scientific articles and presented his work on deaf education at several scientific meetings including the inaugural scientific session of the American Academy of Ophthalmology and Otolaryngology.

In the following years, Goldstein would continue his research in otolaryngology, but deaf education would remain at the forefront of his professional life as he was "frustrated by the futility of contemporary medical treatment and the education provided to the deaf." He developed a compassion for the families burdened with the struggles of inadequate care and education for the deaf. His concern for providing a better education would begin the foundations of the Central Institute for the Deaf (CID). Goldstein began using his own house at Vandeventer and Westminster Place in St. Louis, MO as his office, utilizing his downstairs area as "a waiting room, offices, examination rooms, and an operating room," while the rest of the Goldstein family lived on the upstairs level. Only months after converting his home into his clinic space, an additional area was built onto the back side of the house for postoperative patients to temporarily live, which Goldstein respectively called "the hospital." In 1910 a woman came to Goldstein seeking his help in educating her daughter, who was deaf. He allowed the child to live in "the hospital" while he would work with her in scholastics and other speech practices on a daily basis. Soon after her admittance, word spread of his work and the number of requests for children to work with Goldstein surpassed what he alone could handle. In 1914, he hired two teachers of the deaf to work with just four children. By 1916, this small operation had outgrown not just the two teachers, but Goldstein's entire house. With this predicament the first CID building was constructed on South Kingshighway. This building housed 38 students and 11 teachers all devoted to deaf education. By the time of his death, CID would be internationally acclaimed and would have more than 300 enrolled students from the U.S., as well as several foreign countries. In 1929, the second school building was constructed on South Euclid Avenue where CID expanded into adult auditory rehabilitation. At this time the training standards for teachers of the deaf were raised, requiring two years of pre-professional college education and a two-year professional curriculum, to ensure the highest quality education possible for their deaf students. While the intention of CID was the education of deaf children, "a second mission of great importance was the training of teachers of the deaf." Goldstein was noted to go out of his way to personally instruct the newly hired teachers in deaf education methods. By the time of his death the institute had seen over 700 trained teachers employed to further deaf education.

Despite his successes, Goldstein's mission in furthering the legitimacy of CID was not yet complete. The only issue was funding for further expansion of the institute. Goldstein was once described as an "entrepreneurial showman," which he fully lived up to in 1939. Despite the Great Depression being at its peak, and philanthropy not being a common investment of time or money, Goldstein sought to further expand CID through fundraising. He began planning a fundraising night, which he would host, for the institute's 25th anniversary. He signed a contract for a night at the St. Louis Municipal Auditorium and began to prepare. The centerpiece of the event was to be his close friend Helen Keller; a "woman of striking intelligence who enjoyed responding to questions in English, French, or German, depending on the language of the question". Goldstein had many memories of his friendship with Keller, but was always "particularly pleased" to recount the story detailing how he taught her to Fox Trot at a ball in Boston. Over the course of the fundraising night, many of the attendees witnessed Keller's linguistic abilities and asked her many questions. The night eventually came to an end and, against all odds, many generous donors made the night a massive financial success.

By 1940, clinical advances and expansion of the fields related to hearing and deafness continued to feed the growth of CID and more building space was once again needed. Goldstein pushed to buy the land directly adjacent to the existing CID buildings, but a project of such a scale was turned down by the Board of Managers due to the fear of the looming World War II. In January 1941, at 71 years of age, Goldstein had a stroke, which forced his early professional retirement. In the final months of his life "he was down, but not out." Following his debilitating stroke, he purchased the two apartment buildings next to CID with his own money for its expansion. On July 27, 1941, Goldstein died at his summer home in Frankfort, Michigan, and was buried at New Mount Sinai Cemetery.

He donated the land from the apartment buildings to CID. A decade later, in 1951, the land was used for the building of a cutting edge clinic and fully outfitted research lab, which contained one of only two anechoic chambers in the U.S., subsequently allowing dozens of important findings fortifying CID as a modern institution.

Goldstein was not just known for his professional endeavors; he also was a man who appreciated the arts. He was a member of the Board of the St. Louis Symphony and had an expansive art collection that contained over 3,000 pieces, which he donated to CID upon his death. He also collected hundreds of Native American Relics, stamps, snuff bottles, mechanical banks, rare medical books, and glass paperweights from across the globe, which he also donated to CID, the Missouri Historical Society, and others upon his passing. In his frequent educational travels to Europe, it was noted that he frequently enjoyed fishing, going to museums, and that "his first stop in each location would be his favorite book store."

He also served as President of the American Otological Society and The Triological Society, which once presented Goldstein with a gold medal rewarding his outstanding work with the deaf. In an "interesting turn of events," Goldstein was the first Triological Society President to decline the offer of delivering the Presidential Address at the annual meeting. He simply said "We are anxious that this program will speak for itself."
