= Theodor Simon Flatau =

German physician (1860–1937)

Theodor Simon Flatau (4 June 1860 – 1937) was a German physician.

Flatau was born in Lyck, East Prussia (today Ełk, Poland), where he attended school. He passed his Abitur at the Graues Kloster in Berlin and studied medicine at the Universities of Berlin and Heidelberg. In 1883 Flatau started to work as a physician in Berlin, specialized on ear- and nose-diseases. He became a teacher of voicephysiology and the theory of singing at the royal music-academy and studied Philosophy and Psychology in 1894-97 In 1926 Flatau became the head of the phoniatric section of the Charité hospital and was dismissed in 1933.

Flatau died in Berlin.

== Publications ==
- "Die Laryngoskopie und Rhinoskopie mit Einschluss der Allgemeinen Diagnostik und Therapie," Berlin, 1890
- Die Nasen-, Rachen- und Kehlkopfkrankheiten, Leipzig 1894
- Die Bauchrednerkunst (with H. Gutzmann), Leipzig 1894
- Die Nasen-, Rachen- und Kehlkopfkrankheiten, Lehrbuch für Ärzte und Studierende, Leipzig 1895
- Die Sprachgebrechen des Jugendlichen Alters, Halle 1896
- Hygiene des Kehlkopfes und der Stimme; die Stimmstörungen der Sänger, Vienna 1898
- Die Anwendung des Röntgenschen Verfahrens in der Rhinolaryngologie, Vienna 1899
- Die Hysterie in ihren Beziehungen zu den oberen Luftwegen und zum Ohre, Halle 1899
- Die Bauchrednerkunst mit Einschluss der allg. Diagnostik, Berlin 1899
- Prophylaxe der Hals- und Nasenkrankheiten, Munich 1900
- Intonationsstörungen und Stimmverlust, Berlin 1902
