= Stenvers =

Stenvers is a Dutch surname. Notable people with the surname include:

- Björn Stenvers (born 1972), Dutch museum director
- Hendrik Willem Stenvers (1889–1973), Dutch physician
  - Stenvers projection, oblique view of skull in radiology
