= Piggy bank =

Novelty container used for holding coin money

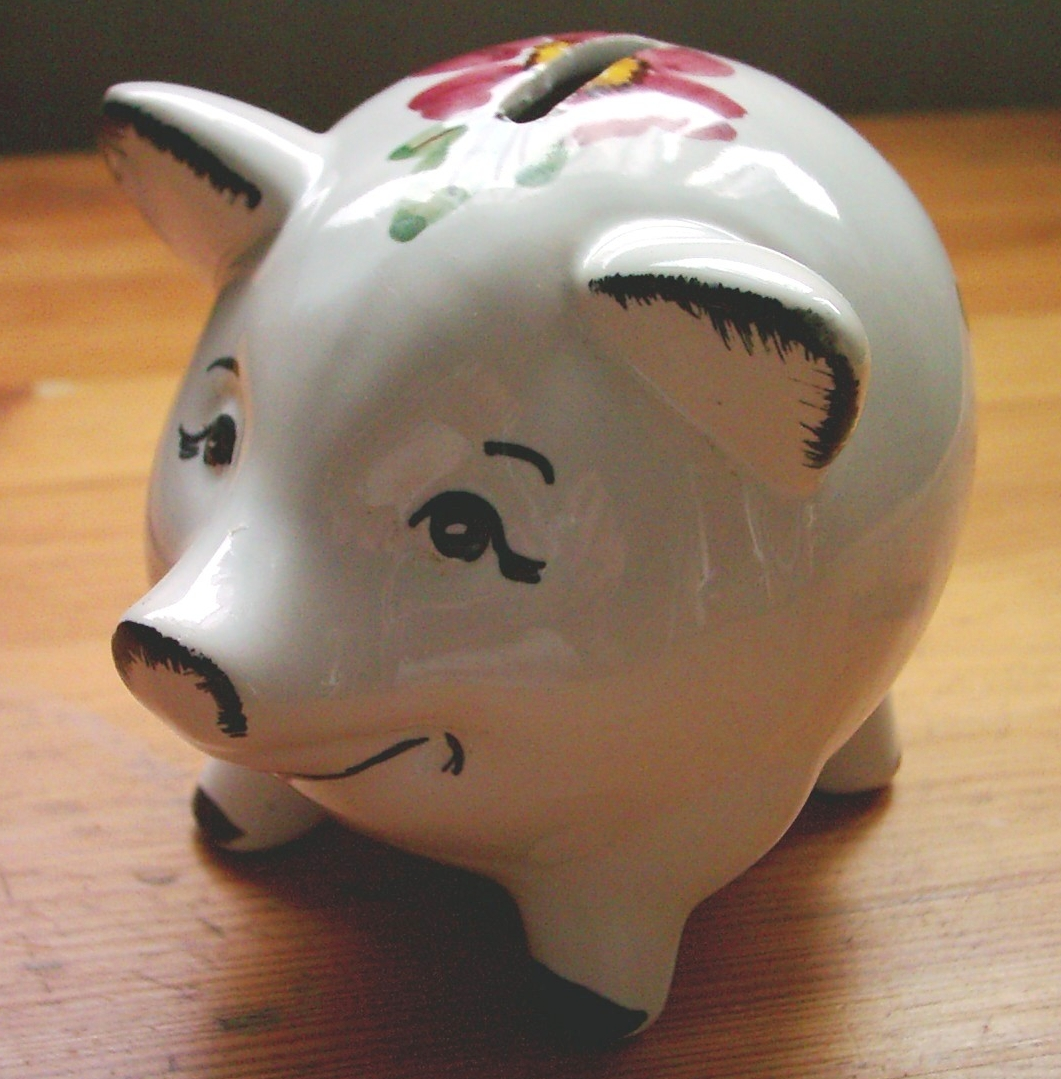
A piggy bank, circa 1970.

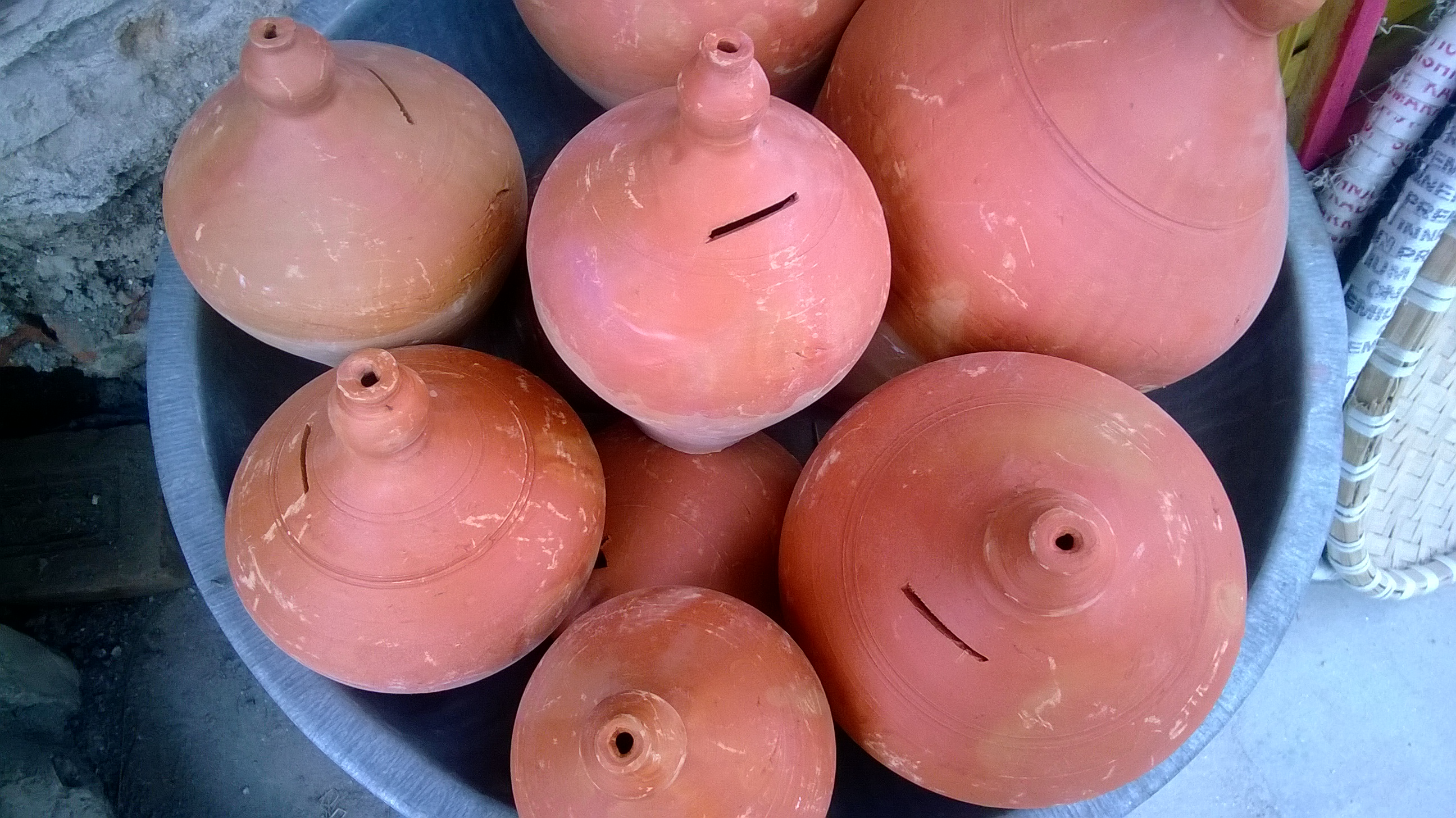
Earthen pots used in Nepal as piggy banks.

A piggy bank (sometimes penny bank or money box) is a coin container normally used by children, featuring a slot at the top to insert coins or folded bank notes. The piggy bank is known to collectors as a "still bank" as opposed to the "mechanical banks" popular in the early 20th century. These items are also often used by companies for promotional purposes, and many financial service companies use piggy banks as logos for their savings products.

== Uses ==
The general use of piggy banks is to store loose change in a quaint, decorative manner. They commonly serve as a pedagogical device to teach children the rudiments of thrift and saving; money can be easily inserted but is more difficult to remove. Because they can be fairly secure from casual theft, they are sometimes used by temples and churches to collect monetary donations, with the contents removed periodically.

== Design ==
Modern piggy banks are usually made of painted ceramic or porcelain. They are popularly in the shape of a rotund pig, but come in a range of shapes, sizes, and colors. In addition to a slot at the top, many piggy banks have a rubber plug on the underside to allow removal of the coins; others are made of vinyl and have a removable nose for easy coin access. Some incorporate electronic systems that calculate the amount of money deposited. To discourage spending, some banks do not have an opening for removal of coins, requiring the owner to smash the bank with a hammer or other means, to access the money within.

== Origins ==
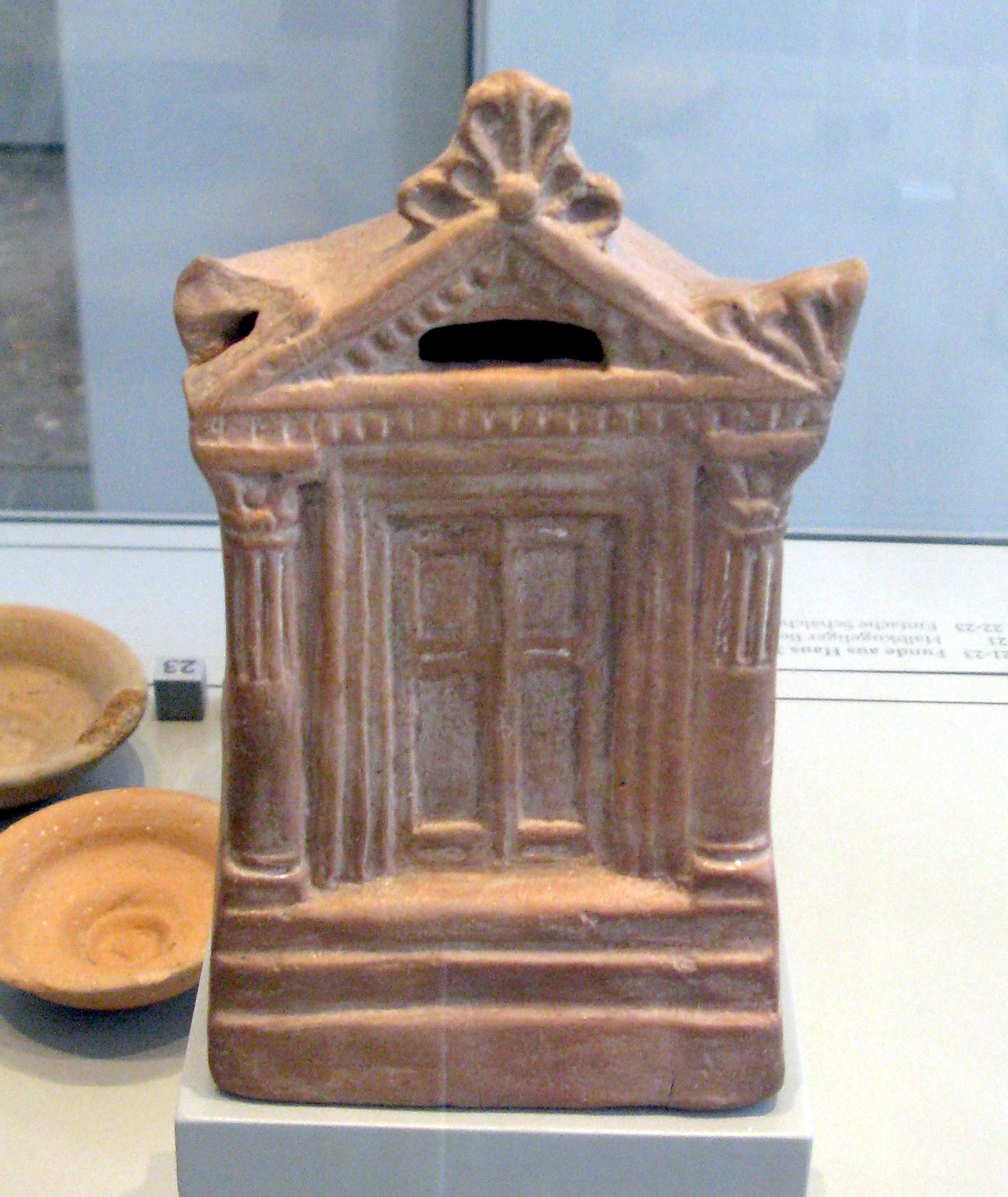
An ancient Greek money box from Priene, 2nd century BC.

The oldest Western find of a money box dates from the 2nd century BC Greek colony Priene, Asia Minor, and features the shape of a miniature Greek temple with a slit in the pediment. Money boxes of various forms were also excavated in Pompeii and Herculaneum, and appear quite frequently in late ancient provincial sites, particularly in Roman Britain and along the Rhine.

=== Pig shape ===
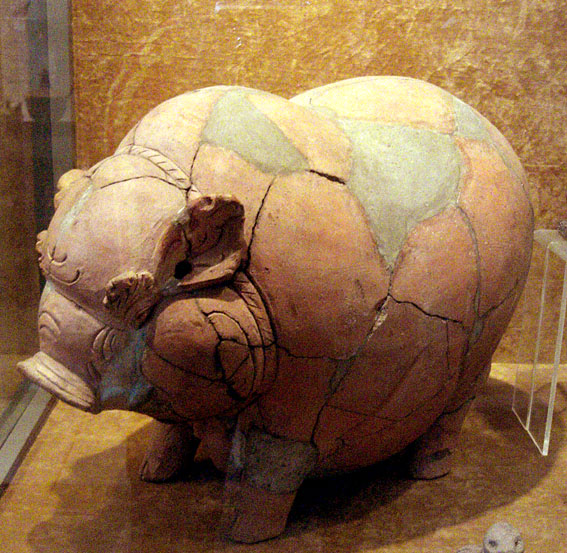
Majapahit terracotta piggy bank, 14th/15th century Trowulan, East Java. (Collection of National Museum of Indonesia, Jakarta)

The earliest known pig-shaped money containers date to the 12th century on the island of Java. The Javanese term cèlèngan (ꦕꦺꦭꦺꦁꦔꦤ꧀; literally "likeness of a wild boar", (Note: A cèlèng (ꦕꦺꦭꦺꦁ) is a wild boar, with the "an" affix used to denote a likeness) but used to mean both "savings" and "piggy bank") is also in the modern Indonesian language.

A large number of boar-shaped piggy banks were discovered at the large archaeological site surrounding Trowulan, a village in the Indonesian province of East Java and a possible site of the capital of the Majapahit Empire.

There are some folk etymologies regarding the English language term "piggy bank," but in fact, there is no clear origin for the phrase. The earliest citation in the Oxford English Dictionary is from 1913, and from 1902 for the variant "pig bank". The earliest known uses of "pig bank" are in newspaper articles from 1900. The popularity of Western piggy banks may have originated in Germany, where pigs were revered as symbols of good fortune. The oldest German piggy bank dates to the 13th century and was recovered during construction work in Thuringia.

== See also ==
- Maneki-neko
- Tudor money box

== Image gallery ==
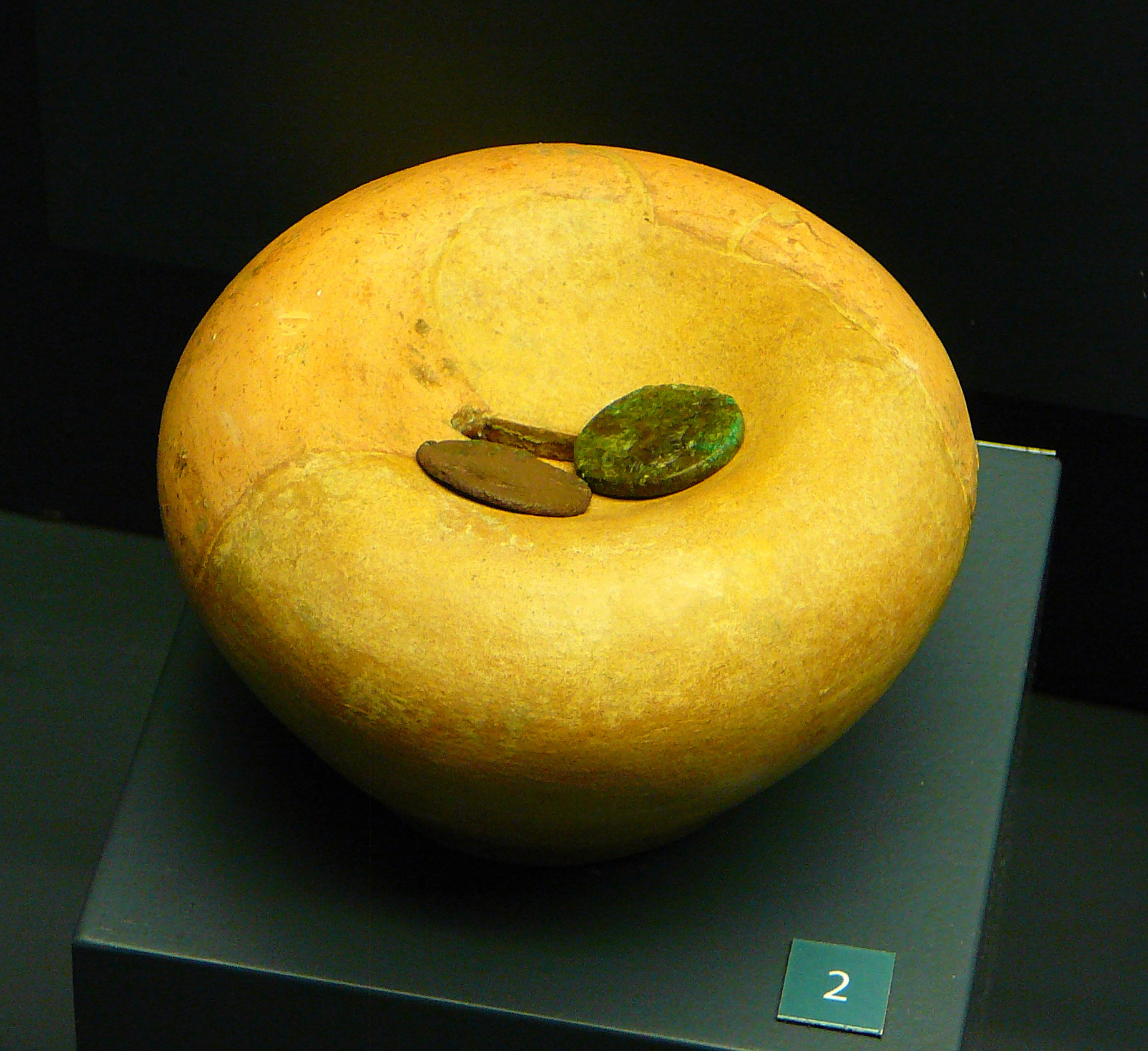
Roman vase-shaped money box (2nd/3rd century AD). Ancient money boxes appear in the archaeological record in a wide variety of shapes.

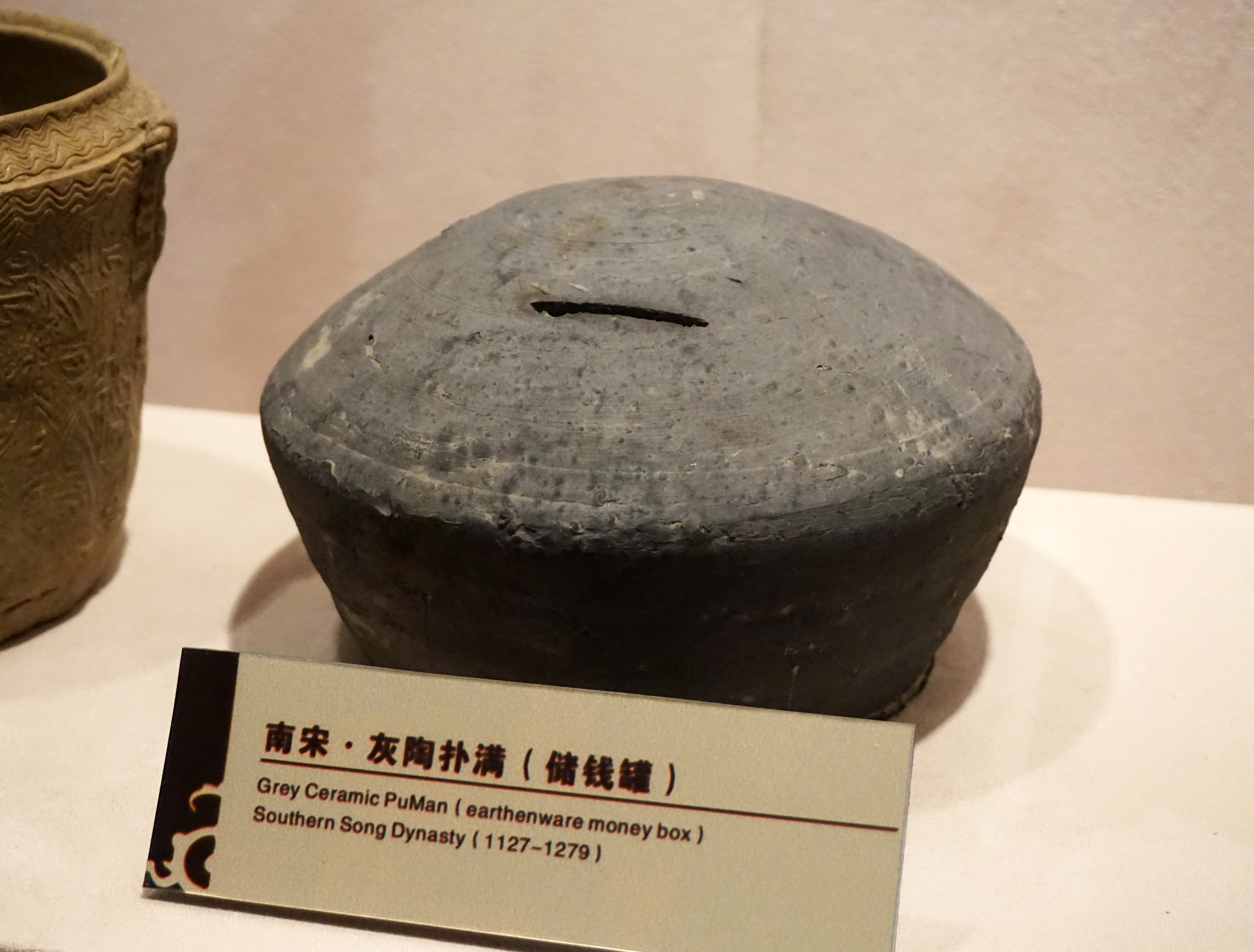
Money box from the Southern Song dynasty (1127–1279).

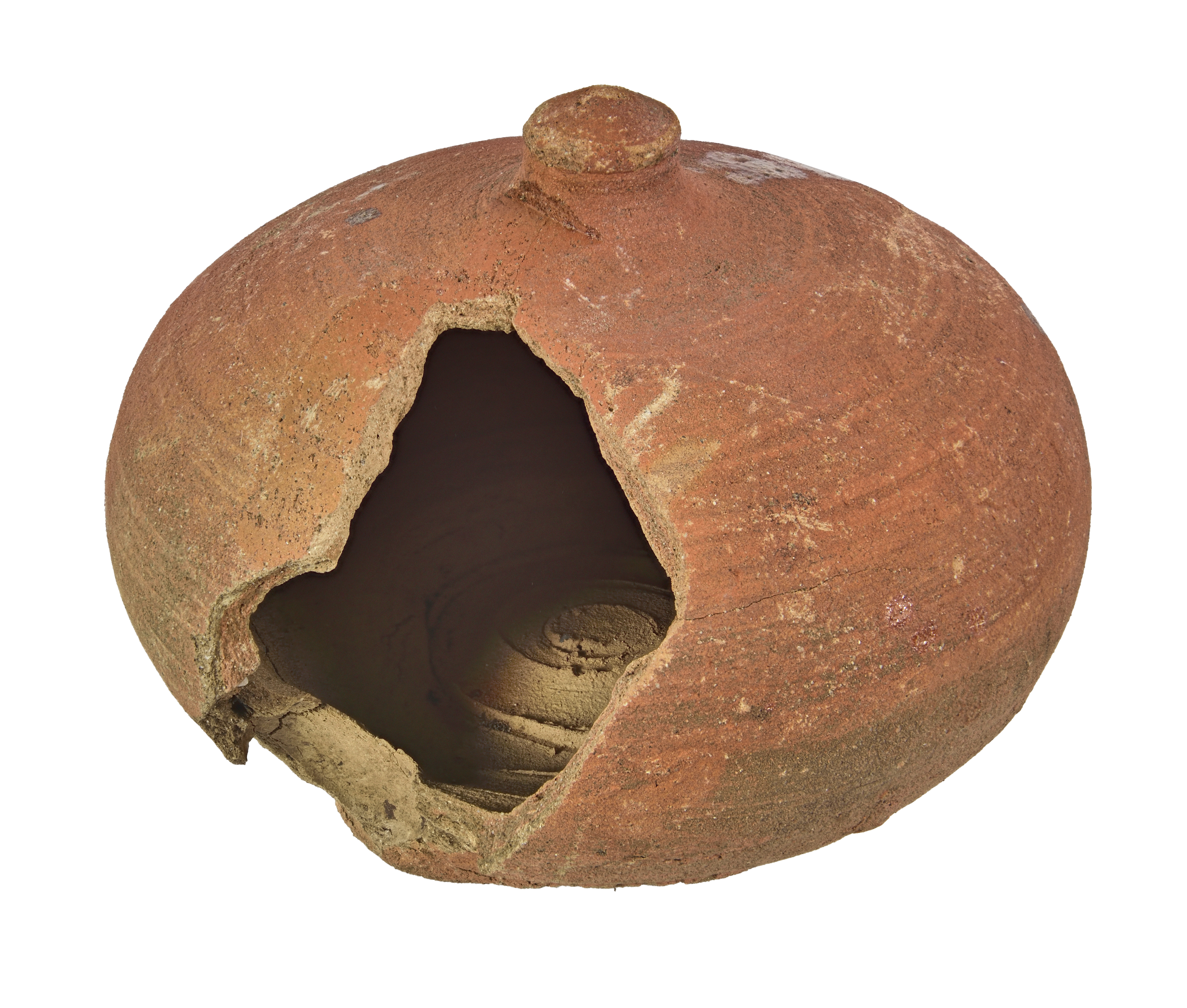
Broken money box in red earthenware (between 1250 and 1350), archaeological find from Bruges.

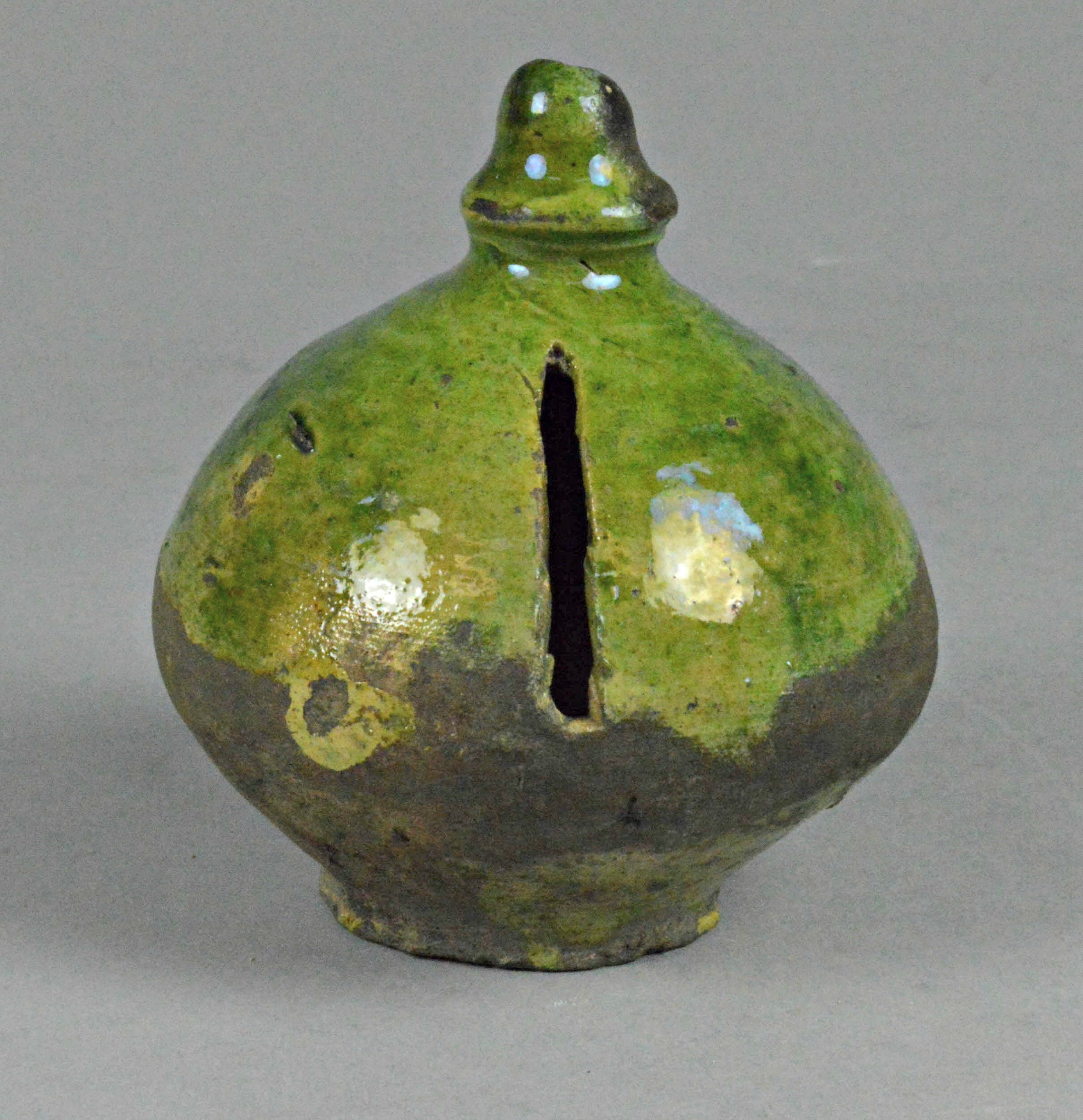
Tudor money box from the 16th century, England.
