= Hermann Gutzmann =

German physician (1865–1922)

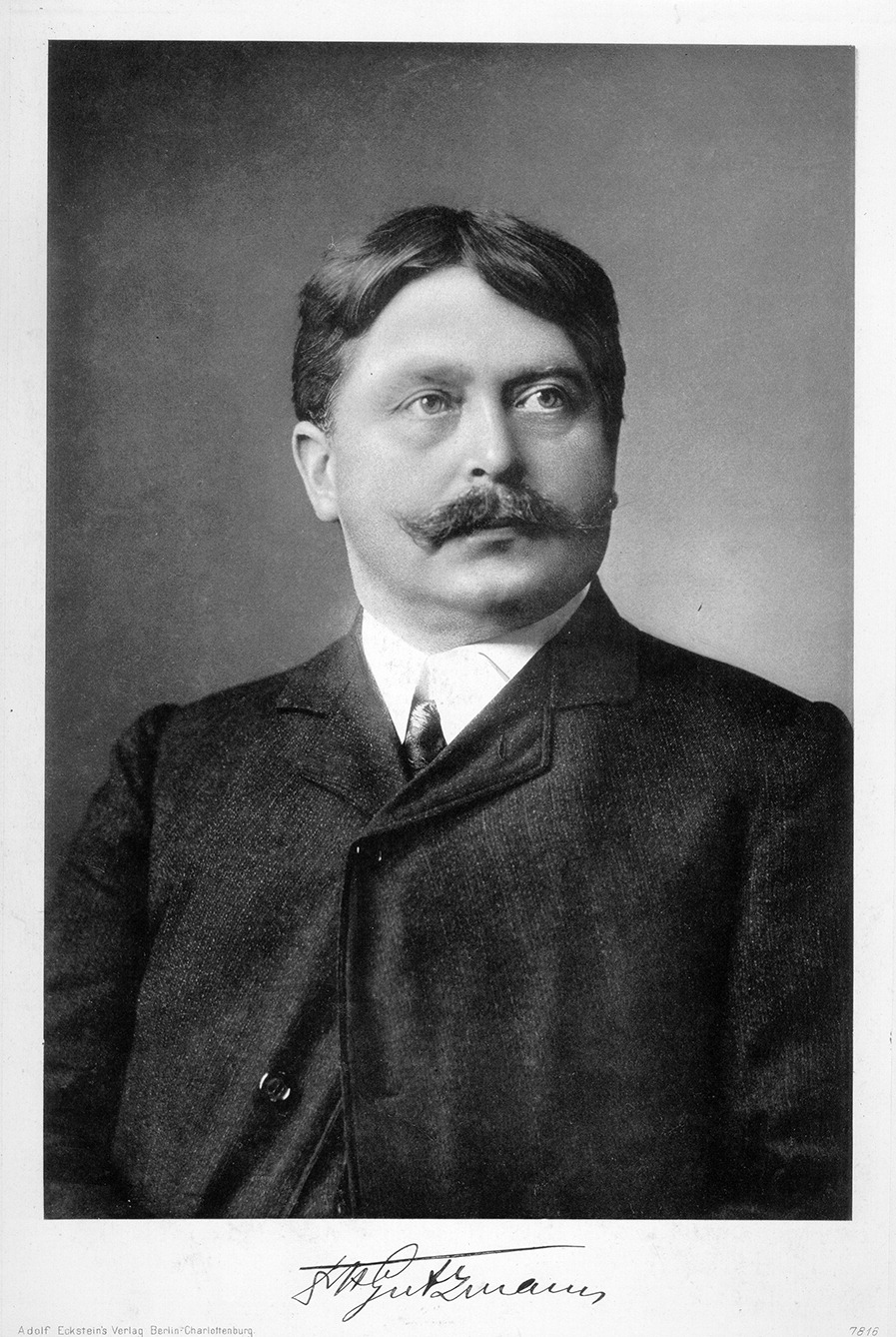
- Born: 29 January 1865; Bütow, Pomerania, Kingdom of Prussia, German Confederation
- Died: 4 November 1922 (aged 57); Berlin, Free State of Prussia, Weimar Republic
- Occupation: Physician
- Children: Hermann Gutzmann, Jr.

Academic background
- Education: University of Berlin
- Thesis: Über das Stottern (1887)

Academic work
- Discipline: Medicine
- Sub-discipline: Voice and speech pathology
- Notable students: Emil Fröschels; Max Nadoleczny; Władysław Ołtuszewski; Rudolf Schilling; Hugo Stern
- Notable works: Des Kindes Sprache und Sprachfehler (1894); Physiologie der Stimme und Sprache (1909)

Hermann Carl Albert Gutzmann, Sr. (29 January 1865 – 4 November 1922) was a German physician. He is considered the founder of phoniatrics as a medical discipline.

== Early life and education ==
Hermann Gutzmann was born into a Jewish family in Bütow, Pomerania, in 1865. His father, Albert Gutzmann, was a prominent teacher for the deaf and dumb.

He graduated from the Friedrichswerdersches Gymnasium in 1883, and went on to study medicine in Berlin under Ernst von Bergmann, Carl Gerhardt, and others. He received the degree of Doctor of Medicine from the University of Berlin in 1887, with the dissertation Über das Stottern ("On Stuttering").

== Career ==
From 1889 Gutzmann practised as a specialist in diseases of the vocal organs, and, together with his father, he founded in 1890 the journal Medizinisch-pädagogische Monatsschrift für die gesamte Sprachheilkunde. In 1891 he established an outpatient clinic for the speech-impaired in Berlin, which was moved to the Medizinische Poliklinik in 1907 and affiliated with the Charité Hospital in 1912. From 1896 Gutzmann also directed a private clinic and sanatorium for the speech-impaired in Zehlendorf. He completed his habilitation in 1905 on the basis of his work Über die Atmungsstörungen beim Stottern ("On Respiratory Disorders and Stuttering"). In his inaugural lecture, he outlined the close relationship of speech therapy to other areas of medical practice.

During World War I, Gutzmann ran a treatment centre for traumatized soldiers who had developed speech and voice disorders.

Gutzmann published 13 books and over 300 scientific papers in his lifetime. He was a member of the Prussian State Health Council, an honorary member of the Austrian Society for Experimental Phonetics, secretary of the Berlin Laryngological Society, and a member of various learned societies.

He died of sepsis in November 1922 after suffering a stab wound from a gramophone needle.

== Selected bibliography ==
- Verhütung und Bekämpfung des Stotterns in der Schule. Berlin. 1889.
- Facial speech-reading. Washington: Gibson Brothers. 1892.
- Vorlesungen über die Störungen der Sprache. Berlin: Kornfeld. 1893. hdl:2027/uc1.b3393184.
- Die Bauchrednerkunst. Berlin: A. Meiner. 1894. hdl:2027/chi.65442124. With Theodor Simon Flatau.
- Des Kindes Sprache und Sprachfehler. 1894.
- Die praktische Anwendung der Sprachphysiologie beim ersten Leseunterricht. Sammlung von Abhandlungen aus dem Gebiete der Pädagogischen Psychologie und Physiologie; Bd. I, Heft 2. Berlin: Reuther & Reichard. 1897.
- Das Stottern. Frankfurt: J. Rosenheim. 1898.
- Mutism and Aphasia: A Clinical Lecture. Philadelphia: s.n. 1902.
- Stimmbildung und Stimmpflege; gemeinverständliche Vorlesungen. Wiesbaden: Bergmann. 1906. hdl:2027/uc1.c037153035.
- Sur la symptomatologie et le traitement de l'aphonie spasmodique et d'autres troubles phonateurs d'origine spasmodique (in French). Paris: J.-B. Baillière et fils. 1906. Translated by M. Ménier.
- Sprachstörungen und Sprachheilkunde. Berlin: S. Karger. 1908. hdl:2027/uc1.$b174142.
- Zur Messung der relativen Intensität der menschlichen Stimme. Berlin: S. Karger. 1909. hdl:2027/uc1.b3135867.
- Physiologie der Stimme und Sprache. Die Wissenschaft; Sammlung naturwissenschaftlicher und mathematischerMonographien. 29. HFT. Brunswick: F. Vieweg und Sohn. 1909. hdl:2027/uc1.b4139504.
- Die graphische Registrierung der Stimmund Sprachbewegnungen. 1911. hdl:2027/uc1.$b564107.
