= Stenvers projection =

Radiological technique

- Purpose: Viewing the petrous bone, bony labyrinth and internal auditory canal

Within the medical field of otology, the Stenvers projection is a radiological technique that provides an oblique view of the skull and establishes a better perspective on the petrous bone, bony labyrinth, and internal auditory canal. It focuses on the posteroanterior and lateral planes.

The Stenvers projection was named after the physician Hendrik Willem Stenvers (1889–1973) of Utrecht, who developed it in 1917. It was described in 1938 by Schütz along with the lateral projection, and later recommended by Muntean and Fink in 1941.

For the Stenvers projection, a patient is placed facing the film, with the head flexed slightly and rotated 45 degrees away from the side being examined. The X-ray beam will be angled 10 to 15 degrees caudal.
