= Mechanical bank =

Type of container used for coins

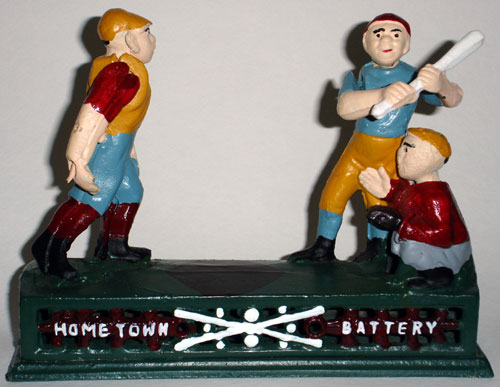
An example of a mechanical bank

Mechanical banks are small containers with a decorative mechanical action, used to store coins. They were originally intended to promote saving money among children in the mid-19th century. Frequently made of cast iron, mechanical banks were often creatively designed, depicting historical, legendary, or everyday events to increase their appeal. Each bank performed a stunt or an action when a coin was dropped into a slot and a lever was pulled. The banks quickly became popular with children and adults alike and soon became a sought-after collector's item.

== See also ==
- Piggy bank
