= TWJ Foundation =

The TWJ Foundation is a charity providing grants to ENT Specialist Registrars who are currently on a numbered otolaryngological training programme in the British Isles, in order to enhance their otological experience. These grants include major overseas Otology Fellowships. More than half of British otologists have been associated in some way with a TWJ grant.

== History ==
The TWJ Foundation (after Thomas Whickham Jones) was founded in 1954 and became a registered charity on 14 March 1974. It was largely funded by Lilian Wickham Higgs and her son Thomas Higgs, in memory of her father, Thomas Wickham-Jones (1847–1929), who had been a City of London wharfinger.

Patrick Hunter Jobson (1913–1998), a consultant in otorhinolaryngology, who had married one of TWJ's granddaughters, became the Foundation's first executive Chairman, a position he held until 1994. His successor was David Wright.
