= Tudor money box =

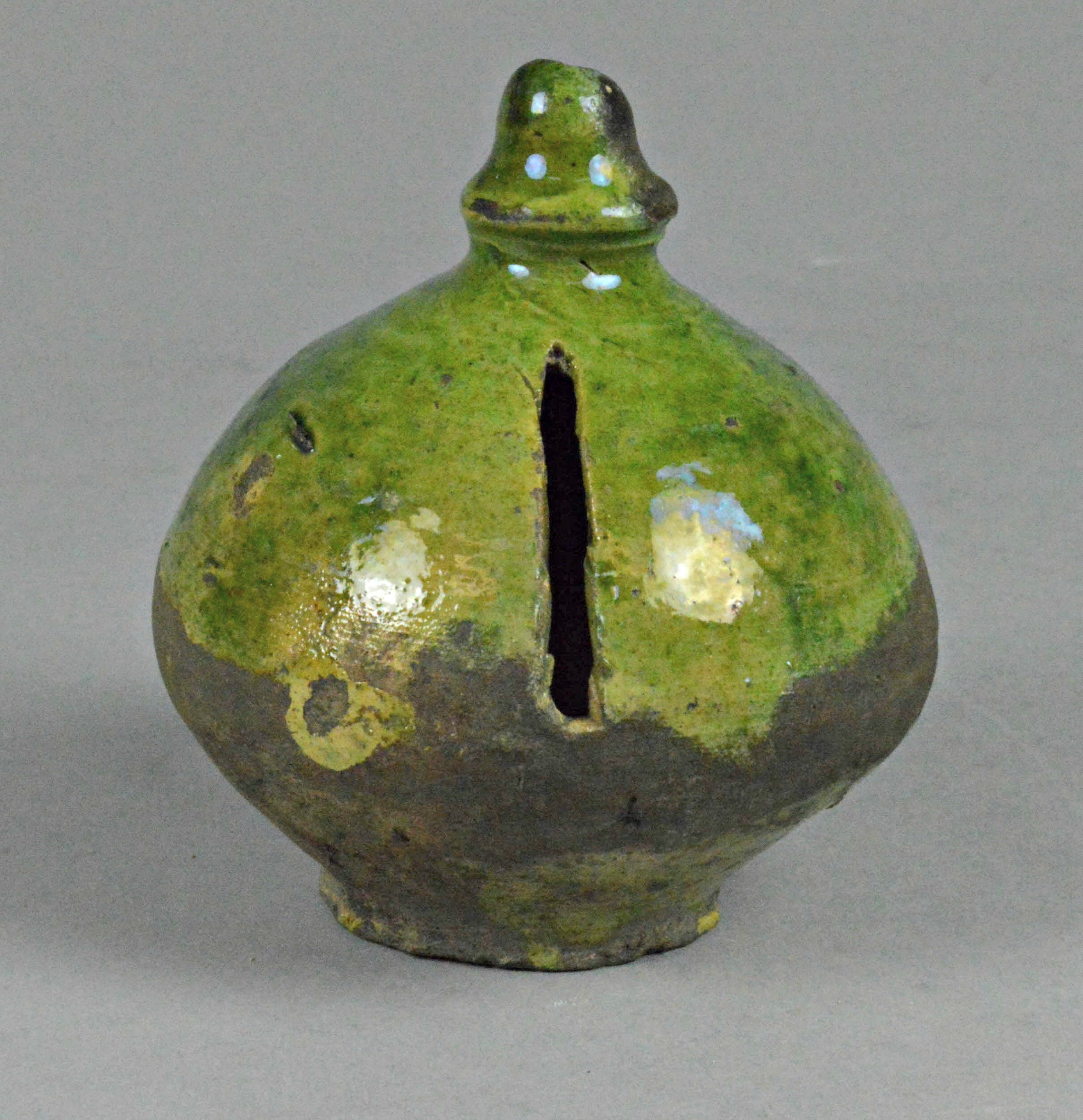
16th century Tudor money box

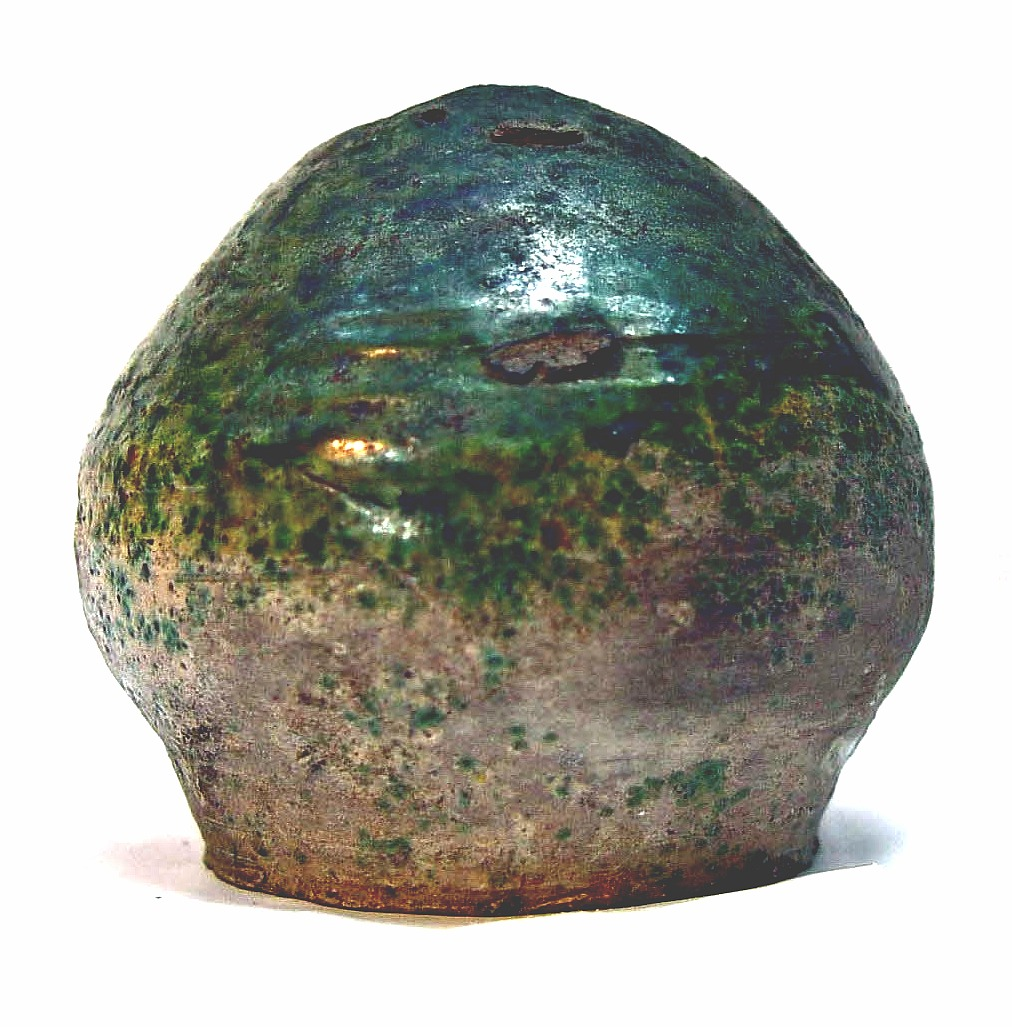
Money pot

A Tudor money box (or Tudor money pot) is a glazed earthenware container used in late Medieval Britain as a small, portable bank for collecting and saving money. The typical money box was a round, sealed, green-glazed pot with a vertical coin slot. These sturdy, small pots were commonly used by Elizabethan theatres to collect ticket earnings. Money would be retrieved from the full money box by breaking it open and destroying the pot.

== Description ==
The small ceramic money box was typically spherical in shape. By the 16th century, the form included a tapering, bell-shaped, knobbed top. The container was completely sealed with a narrow coin slot on the side. The glazed, ceramic pots were produced in Surrey and near the Surrey-Hampshire borders. Individual pots were made by white-firing earthenware and then decorating each item with a coloured glaze, known as "Tudor Green". The distinctive colour was created by adding powdered copper to a clear, lead glaze. The glazed pot would range in colour from dark green to yellow-green, depending upon the colour of the clay and thickness of the glaze.

== History ==
Tudor money boxes were used as small, inexpensive collecting and savings banks in Britain from the 1300s to the 1600s. They were in service during the Elizabethan era by London and surrounding area theatres to collect ticket money from customers. When the money pot was full, it was destroyed to retrieve the coins. In 1988 and in 2010, the Museum of London Archaeology (MOLA) uncovered many Tudor money box fragments during excavation at the site of the Elizabethan period Rose Theatre in London. Original, unbroken money boxes are quite rare.

== See also ==
- Christmas box
- Piggy bank
- Poor box
