= Otology =

Branch of medicine for the ear

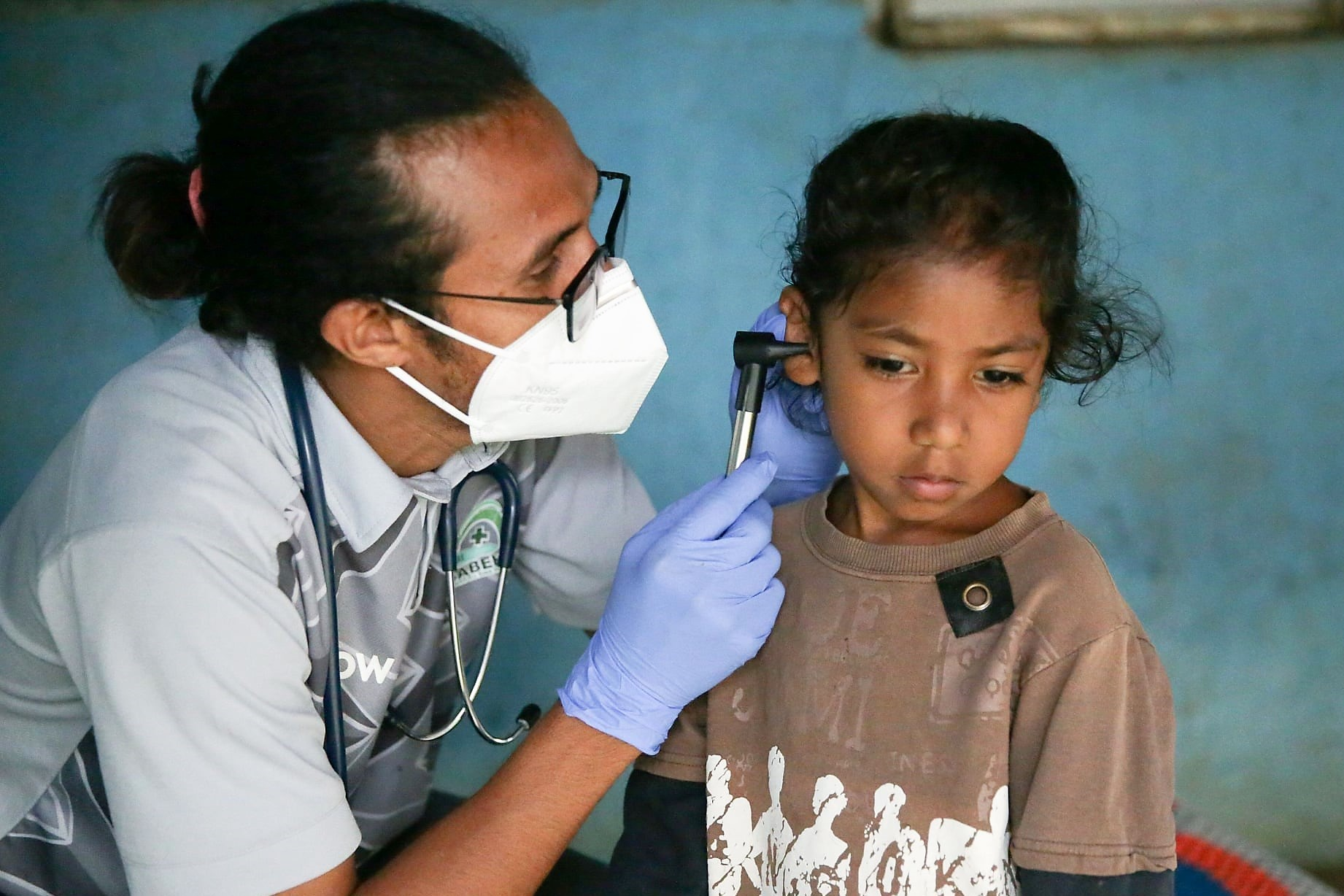
Ear inspection

Otology is a branch of medicine which studies normal, pathological anatomy and physiology of the ear (hearing). Otology also studies vestibular sensory systems, related structures and functions, as well as their diseases, diagnosis and treatment. Otologic surgery generally refers to surgery of the middle ear and mastoid related to chronic otitis media, such as tympanoplasty (ear drum surgery), ossiculoplasty (surgery of the hearing bones) and mastoidectomy. Otology also includes surgical treatment of conductive hearing loss, such as stapedectomy surgery for otosclerosis.

Neurotology (a related field of medicine and subspecialty of otolaryngology) is the study of diseases of the inner ear, which can lead to hearing and balance disorders. Neurotologic surgery generally refers to surgery of the inner ear, or surgery that involves entering the inner ear with risk to the hearing and balance organs, including labyrinthectomy, cochlear implant surgery, and surgery for tumors of the temporal bone, such as intracanalicular acoustic neuromas. Neurotology is expanded to include surgery of the lateral skull base to treat intracranial tumors related to the ear and surrounding nerve and vascular structures, such as large cerebellar pontine angle acoustic neuromas, glomus jugulare tumors and facial nerve tumors

Some of the concerns of otology include:

- identifying the underlying mechanisms of Ménière's disease,
- finding the causes of tinnitus and developing treatment methods, and
- defining the development and progression of otitis media.

Related concerns of neurotology include:

- studying signal processing in the cochlear implant patient,
- investigating postural control areas and vestibulo-ocular mechanisms, and
- studying the genetics of acoustic neuromas in patients with neurofibromatosis, to better understanding how to treat these tumors and prevent their growth.

== Leaders and innovators ==
Otology, the branch of medicine devoted to the study and treatment of the ear, has been shaped by a succession of physicians and scientists whose work transformed a poorly understood anatomical region into one of the most technically sophisticated fields in surgery. From the early anatomists of the Renaissance to the endoscopic pioneers of the late twentieth and early twenty-first centuries, these individuals redefined what was possible in the diagnosis and surgical management of ear disease.

== History ==
=== Historical foundations ===
The formal study of ear anatomy began with the Italian anatomists of the sixteenth century. Bartolomeo Eustachi (c. 1510–1574) produced what remains one of the earliest accurate descriptions of the tube connecting the middle ear to the nasopharynx, a structure that continues to bear his name. Gabriele Falloppio (1523–1562), working around the same period, provided detailed descriptions of the facial nerve canal and the semicircular canals, and the chorda tympani—structures whose clinical significance would only become apparent centuries later.

In the eighteenth century, Antonio Scarpa (1752–1832) advanced understanding of the membranous labyrinth and the saccule, laying the groundwork for later investigations into inner-ear physiology.[[3]] These anatomical contributions were essential prerequisites for the clinical specialty that would eventually emerge.

=== The nineteenth century: Otology as a discipline ===
==== Adam Politzer (1835–1920) ====
The Hungarian-born physician Adam Politzer is widely regarded as the founder of clinical otology as an independent specialty. Educated at the University of Vienna, he went on to establish the first dedicated otology clinic in the world in 1873, in collaboration with his colleague Josef Gruber. That same year, together with Anton von Tröltsch and Hermann Schwartze, he had co-founded the Archiv für Ohrenheilkunde (later European Archives of Oto-Rhino-Laryngology), the first periodical devoted entirely to ear disease.

Politzer made fundamental contributions to the understanding of otosclerosis and provided the first comprehensive account of otitis media and its pathophysiology. He devised the technique of middle-ear inflation that bears his name—Politzerization—and authored a five-volume textbook, Lehrbuch der Ohrenheilkunde (1878–1882), which unified the available knowledge of the era and was translated into multiple languages. His insistence on rigorous histological and pathological methods set a standard for scientific inquiry in the field that persisted for generations.

==== Joseph Toynbee (1815–1866) ====
The English surgeon Joseph Toynbee made indispensable contributions to the pathological anatomy of the ear. Over the course of his career he dissected more than two thousand temporal bones, building a collection housed at the Royal College of Surgeons, London, and demonstrating in 1860 that the stapes could become fixed in cases of what was then described as a bony ankylosis of the middle ear—the condition later understood as otosclerosis. His work directly informed the surgical approaches developed by later investigators.

==== Prosper Ménière (1799–1862) ====
The French physician Prosper Ménière made a pivotal contribution in 1861 when he correctly attributed a clinical syndrome of episodic vertigo, tinnitus, and fluctuating hearing loss to disease of the inner ear rather than to a cerebral origin, as had been the prevailing view. The syndrome that carries his name remains a defining diagnostic entity in otology and neurotology.

=== Twentieth-century surgical pioneers ===
==== Julius Lempert (1890–1968) ====
The early twentieth century saw renewed interest in surgical approaches to conductive hearing loss. Julius Lempert, a New York otologist, developed and popularised the single-stage endaural fenestration procedure in 1938 as a means of bypassing the fixed stapes in otosclerosis. Although the technique has since been superseded, Lempert's work demonstrated that functional hearing surgery was feasible and attracted widespread international attention, training a generation of surgeons who carried the approach across the United States and Europe.

==== John J. Shea Jr (1924–2015) ====
The modern era of stapes surgery is generally dated to 1 May 1956, when Memphis otologist John J. Shea Jr performed the first successful stapedectomy—removing the fixed stapes and replacing it with a Teflon prosthesis bridging the oval window.The procedure was a landmark: it produced dramatic hearing restoration in patients who had previously had no surgical option and established the prosthetic replacement of ossicular elements as a viable surgical philosophy. Subsequent refinements led to the technique of stapedotomy, in which a small piston prosthesis is inserted through a precisely drilled fenestra in the footplate, a modification that reduced the risk of inner-ear trauma and improved long-term outcomes.

==== William F. House (1923–2012) ====
Often referred to as the father of neurotology, William F. House of the House Ear Institute in Los Angeles brought neurosurgical thinking to bear on otologic disease. Working alongside neurosurgeon William Hitselberger, House refined surgical approaches to the internal auditory canal and developed techniques for the resection of vestibular schwannomas that reduced mortality and preserved facial function to a degree previously unattained. His most consequential invention was the single-channel cochlear implant, which he began developing in the early 1960s after reading reports of experimental electrode implantation in Paris. Although the device attracted considerable scepticism from the academic establishment, House persisted, and the cochlear implant he championed became the foundation for modern multichannel devices that have since restored functional hearing to hundreds of thousands of people with profound sensorineural deafness. He is also credited with developing the middle fossa approach to the temporal bone, expanding access to the internal auditory canal without traversing the posterior fossa.

==== Graeme Clark, Ingeborg Hochmair and Blake Wilson ====
The multichannel cochlear implant emerged through parallel efforts on three continents. Graeme Clark (born 1935) of the University of Melbourne led the team that developed and implanted the first multichannel cochlear implant in 1978 and collaborated with Cochlear Ltd to bring a commercial device to market by the mid-1980s. Ingeborg Hochmair (b. 1950) of Austria co-founded MED-EL and developed independently a series of device innovations that markedly improved speech perception. Blake Wilson (b. 1947), working in the United States, developed the continuous interleaved sampling (CIS) processing strategy, widely considered the single most important algorithmic advance in cochlear implantation, and was awarded the Lasker–DeBakey Clinical Medical Research Award jointly with Clark and Hochmair in 2013.

=== The endoscopic era ===
==== Origins and rationale ====
The adoption of rod-lens telescopes in rhinology and laryngology during the 1970s and 1980s raised the question of whether analogous optics could enhance access to the middle ear. The traditional operating microscope, while providing excellent illumination and magnification along the line of sight, requires unobstructed axial access and cannot visualise the recesses and angles of the tympanic cavity without bone removal. Early reports of endoscopic inspection of the middle ear as an adjunct to microscopic surgery appeared in the 1980s and early 1990s, but it was not until a surgeon in Dubai began exploring the endoscope as the primary operative instrument that transcanal endoscopic ear surgery (TEES) was established as a coherent surgical philosophy.

==== Muaaz Tarabichi (b. 1959) ====
Muaaz Tarabichi is a Syrian-American otolaryngologist widely credited as the originator of endoscopic ear surgery as a systematic clinical and operative discipline, and is recognised internationally as the father of the field. Born in 1959, he studied medicine at Damascus University before completing postgraduate training in general surgery and otolaryngology at McGill University, Montreal, where he obtained certification from the American Board of Otolaryngology in 1991.

After a period in private practice in Wisconsin, Tarabichi relocated to Dubai in 1998, joining the American Hospital Dubai as head of the Otolaryngology Department. It was in this setting that he began developing and formalising a wholly transcanal endoscopic approach to middle-ear surgery—the first sustained programme of its kind. Beginning in 1992 he adopted the endoscope as the primary, rather than adjunctive, instrument for cholesteatoma surgery, tympanoplasty, and stapes surgery, and in 1997 published the first peer-reviewed report of endoscopic management of acquired cholesteatoma in the Otolaryngology–Head and Neck Surgery journal. A landmark paper in the Annals of Otology, Rhinology & Laryngology in 1999, titled "Endoscopic Middle Ear Surgery," provided the first systematic description of the principles, instrumentation, and indications for a wholly endoscopic approach to the tympanic cavity.

Tarabichi's contributions extend across multiple sub-domains of otology. He is credited with developing the endoscopic stapedotomy technique, demonstrating that stapes surgery—traditionally considered technically exacting under the microscope—could be performed safely and effectively through the ear canal using a rigid endoscope, with improved visualisation of the oval window and footplate. He also pioneered endoscopic transtympanic Eustachian tube dilatation, first performed in Dubai in the late 1990s, introducing an approach by which the Eustachian tube lumen could be accessed and dilated under direct vision through the tympanic membrane without postauricular incision. His introduction of the Tarabichi Stitch addressed a central ergonomic challenge of single-handed endoscopic surgery, enabling a two-handed operative technique that improved both safety and the range of procedures accessible through the canal.

In 2020, Tarabichi co-founded the Tarabichi Stammberger Ear and Sinus Institute (TSESI) in Dubai with rhinologist Heinz Stammberger. TSESI functions as a research, training, and clinical facility with fully funded fellowships, a wet laboratory, and video production and broadcasting infrastructure, aiming to disseminate advances in endoscopic ear and sinus surgery globally.[[26]] Tarabichi also served as a founding board member of the International Working Group on Endoscopic Ear Surgery (IWGEES), established in 2007, which grew to 125 members across 35 countries and has been instrumental in standardising, teaching, and validating the technique internationally. He has held the chairmanship of the Middle East Academy of Otolaryngology and serves as chair-elect of the International Advisory Board of the American Academy of Otolaryngology–Head and Neck Surgery Foundation.His editorial service has included board membership of The Laryngoscope and the Journal of International Advanced Otology, among other publications.

== See also ==
- Audiology – Branch of science that studies hearing, balance, and related disorders
- Ear Research Foundation
- Neurotology – Head and neck surgery (otorhinolaryngology) subspecialty
- Stenvers projection – Radiological technique
- TWJ Foundation
