= Ear Research Foundation =

US research institute

Coordinates: 27.3200°N 82.5313°W

The Ear Research Foundation, located in Sarasota, Florida, is a center for research and development and medical education. Herbert Silverstein, M.D., is the president and founder of the non-profit corporation.

== Significance ==
A division of the Silverstein Institute, the Ear Research Foundation is one of the largest centers in the world for:

- Ear and Sinus Research and Development
- Ear and Sinus Education
- Ear and Sinus Treatment

== Facilities and equipment ==
The Ear Research Foundation maintains a complete microsurgical laboratory, and an audiovisual and scientific library for ear physicians and surgeons. In 2004, Gloria and Louis Flanzer donated $100,000 to the Temporal Bone and Research Laboratory in the Ear Research Foundation wing. This donation enabled the Ear Research Foundation to purchase microscopes, flat screen monitors and video equipment which visiting physicians use to learn minimally invasive surgical techniques.

== Academic opportunities ==
The Ear Research Foundation also offers a Clinical Fellowship for board eligible or board certified otolaryngologists. The Fellowship provides training in the diverse field of otology. Thirty two fellows have been trained as of 2007.

The Ear Research Foundation offers lectures and symposia, including a Ménière's Symposium, Minimally Invasive Otologic Surgery course, Non-Invasive Cosmetic Facial Rejuvenation and many others. They also host several support group meetings including Tinnitus and Cochlear Implant Support Group Meetings.

== Treatment of ear and sinus disorders ==
The Ear Research Foundation also provides medical care, treatment, and rehabilitation of ear diseases and hearing and balance disorders. Primarily for the low-income sector, Ear Research Foundation provides some treatment funding for children and adults referred from such agencies as children's Medicaid Children's Medical Service, Early Learning Coalition, County Health Department, public schools and service agencies. Ear Research Foundation doctors donate 10 hours each week to provide medical and surgical care.

The Flanzer Children's Hearing Outreach Program, which is run by the Ear Research Foundation, was established in 2004 by a donation from Gloria & Louis Flanzer. The program travels to local pre-schools and daycare facilities to test children's hearing. It offers a free children's clinic to diagnose and treat all ear, nose and throat problems. The Ear Research Foundation clinic has treated 35,000 children and has performed over 8000 surgeries including many cochlear implant surgeries for indigent children.
