= Nicole Stenger =

French-born American artist

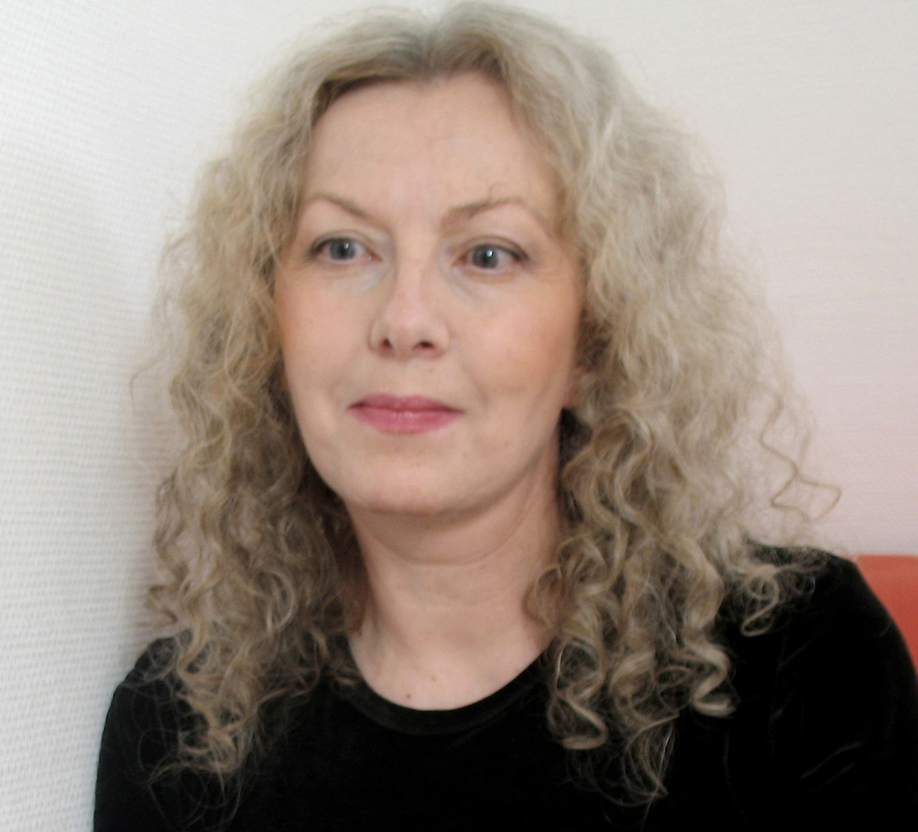
- Nicole Stenger in 2010
- Born: Nicole Stenger; Paris, France
- Known for: New Media Art
- Website: http://www.nicolestenger.com/

Nicole Stenger is a French-born American artist, pioneer in virtual reality and Internet movies. In 1989 to 1991, she was a research fellow at MIT (CAVS & Visual Arts Program, now merged into ACT). In 1991 to 1992, she was a visiting scholar at the Human Interface Technology Laboratory (Hitlab) in Seattle. Her works have been featured in the SIGGRAPH Art Show, the FILE Festival, the JavaMuseum, the Cartier Art Foundation and are part of the Archive of Digital Art (ADA). In 2013, she was included in the "Contemporary women artists on the web" collection of the National Museum of Women in the Arts, in Washington, D.C. To this day, Stenger is considered to be one of the first artists to explore the artistic virtual reality medium.

== Early VR works ==
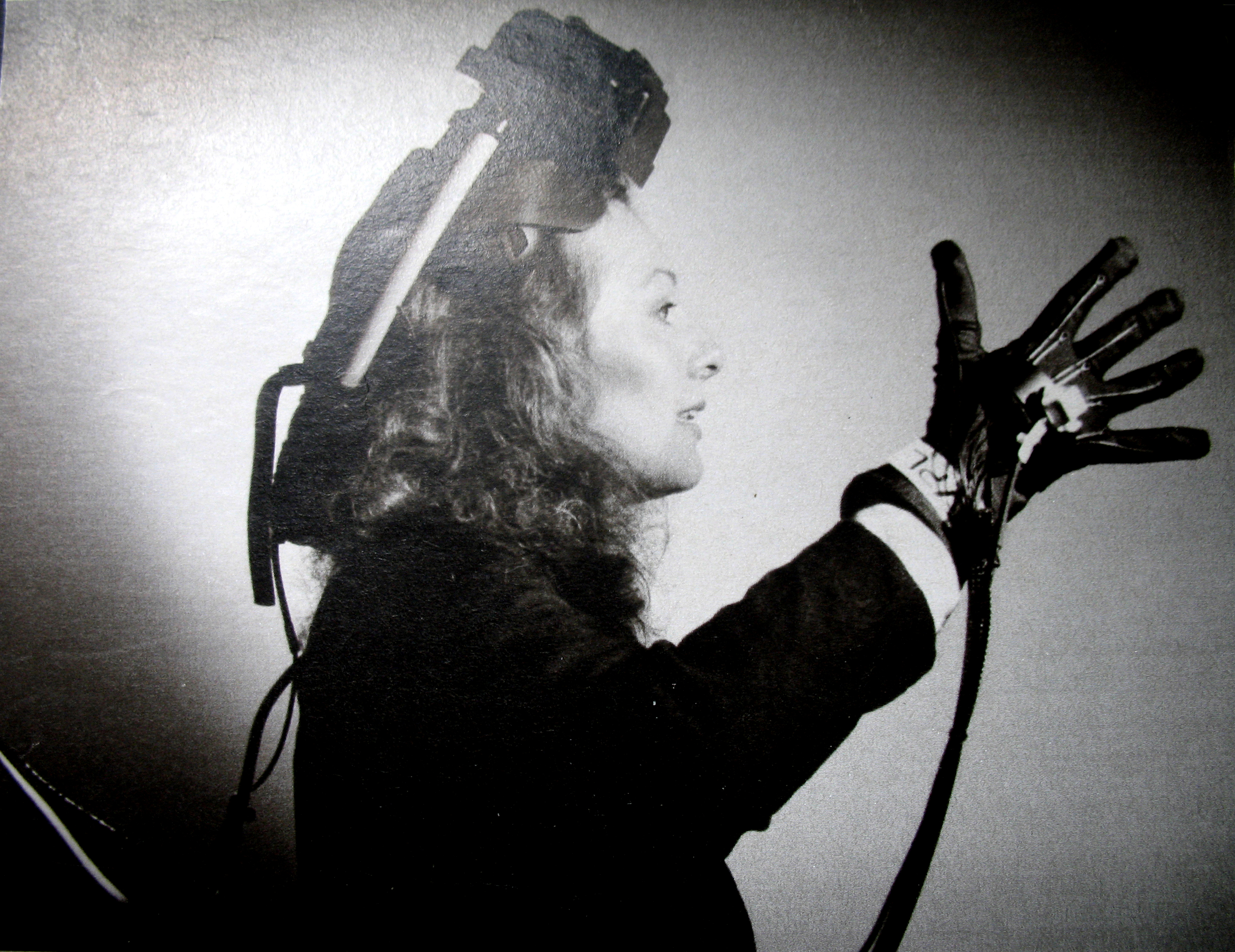
Stenger with VPL VR equipment developed by Jaron Lanier

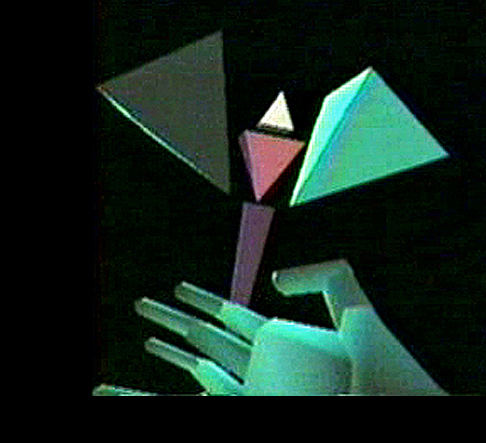
A movie still from Angels (1989–1991)

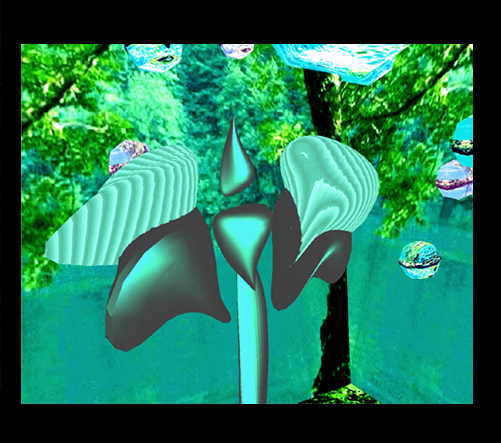
The VRML version of Angels

Between 1989 and 1992, she created Angels, the first immersive movie. The project foundation was laid out at the Visual Arts Program at MIT, employing Wavefront's Advanced Visualizer on a Silicon Graphics personal IRIS. The VR work was done at the Hitlab (University of Washington) using VPL's Virtualization interface and its Body Electric software running on the IRIS. Angels is a real-time interactive immersive movie, a kind of travel in a virtual paradise. The participant uses a VPL Dataglove and high-resolution HRX goggles developed by Jaron Lanier. Following Tom Furness' theory, the artwork was developed for the three senses: vision, audio and touch, though the technological restraints at the time could only implement vision, audio, and a non tactile data glove. Each user starts his/her experience in front of an odd carousel that is a passage to more VR worlds. Touching one of the three angels’ hearts in the carousel, defines the range in which the following three segments will appear. The duration of the sections varies from just about 30" to 2'30". The brilliantly colourful environments are a gateway to more scenes. The angels' voices ask the users to interact with them, causing a story to open. The music was composed by Diane Thome. While at MIT, Stenger also contributed to the seminal Cyberspace First Steps edited by Michael L. Benedikt with the now famous essay "Mind is a Leaking Rainbow".

== Online works ==
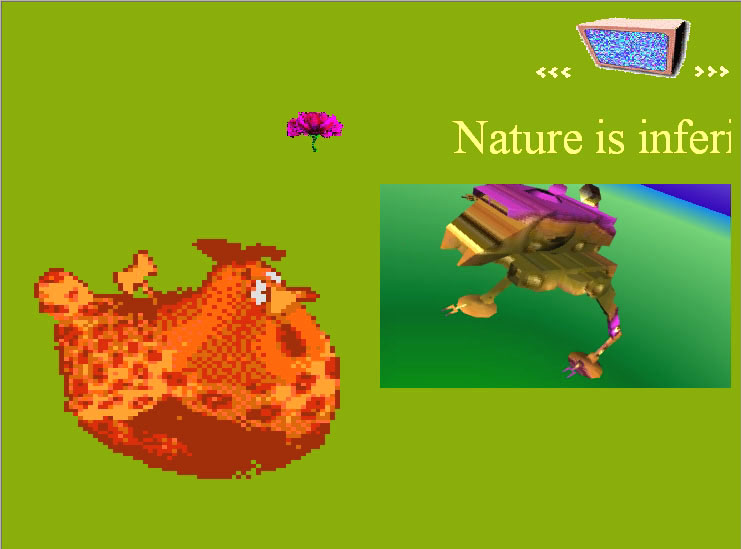
A screenshot from Nature (2000)

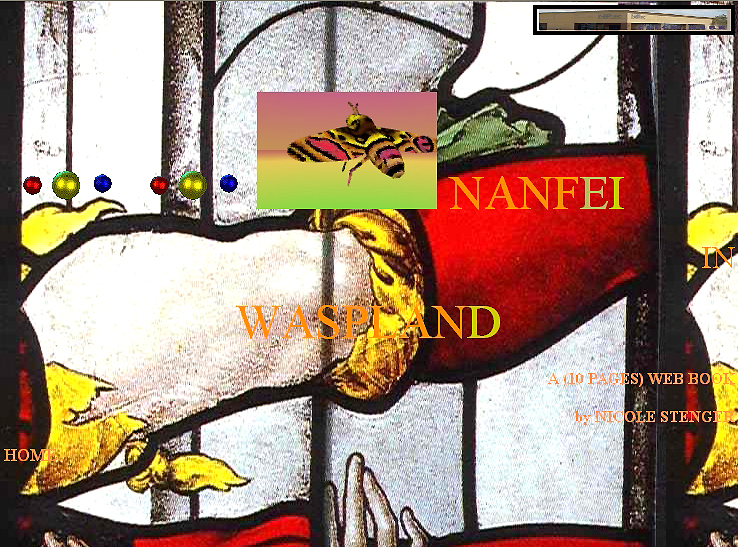
A screenshot from Nanfei in Waspland (2001)

In the 1990s, after the completion of her VR project, Stenger worked on VRML works and developed online art projects that are early examples of web cinema. My Faux Cinema’s website (1998–2003) was a project composed of web pages with animated gifs, java applets, open source audio files, textual parts written by Stenger or sampled from the Internet. It included VRML movies, web books and “faux films”. Stenger's web books, To Dream or Not to Eat (1998), California Trilogy (1996-2000), Nature (2000), Nanfei in Waspland (2000) show her innovative spirit.A web book is a kind of book with a story, a cover, an introduction, a conclusion, and a narrative of seven to twelve pages. The “faux films”, Fresh! (2000) and Bitchery (2001), are stylistic jokes. They mimic cinema moving images through javascripts.

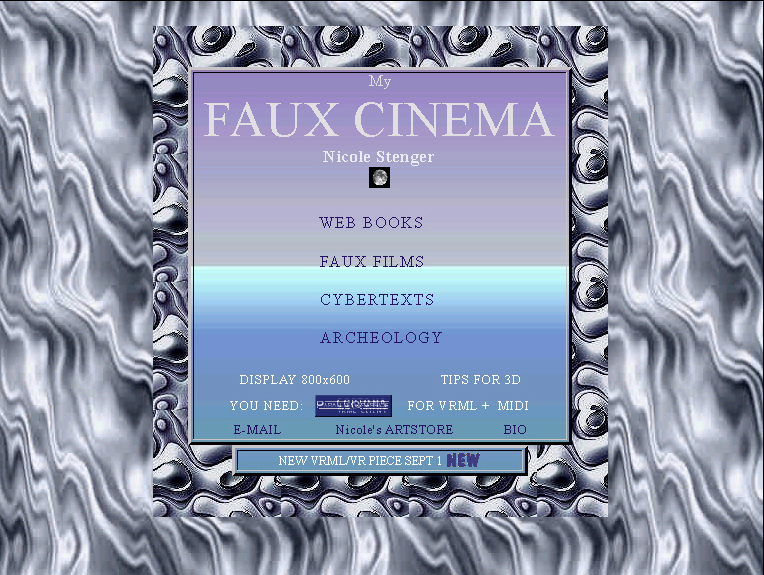
A screenshot from My Faux Cinema (1998-2003)

== Recent works ==
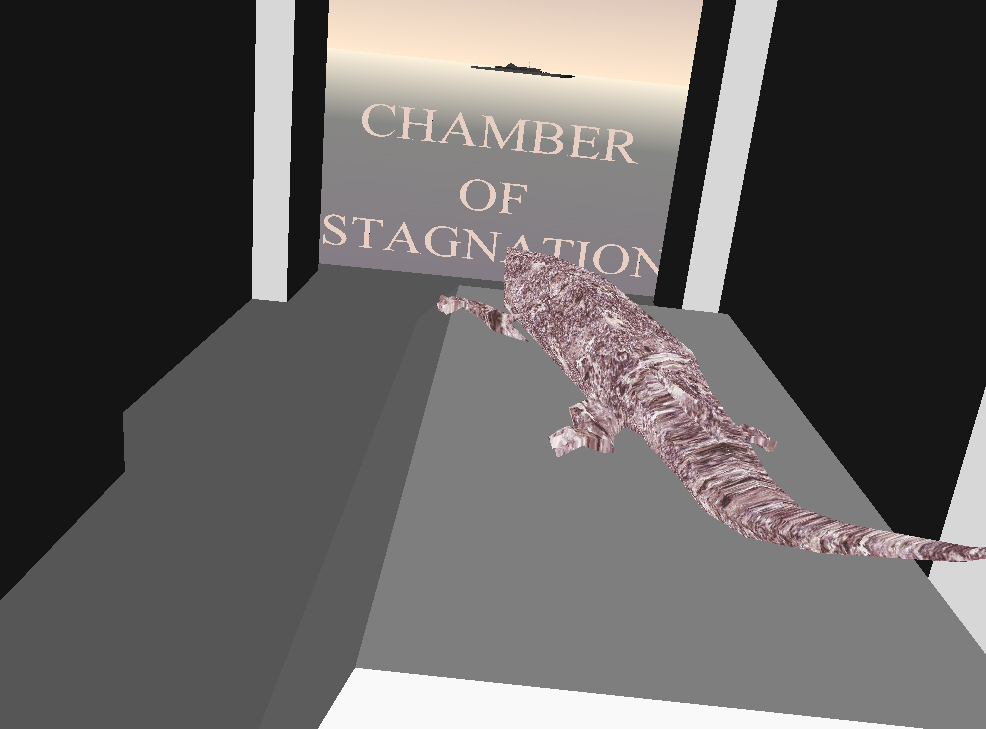
A movie still from Chambers(2001)

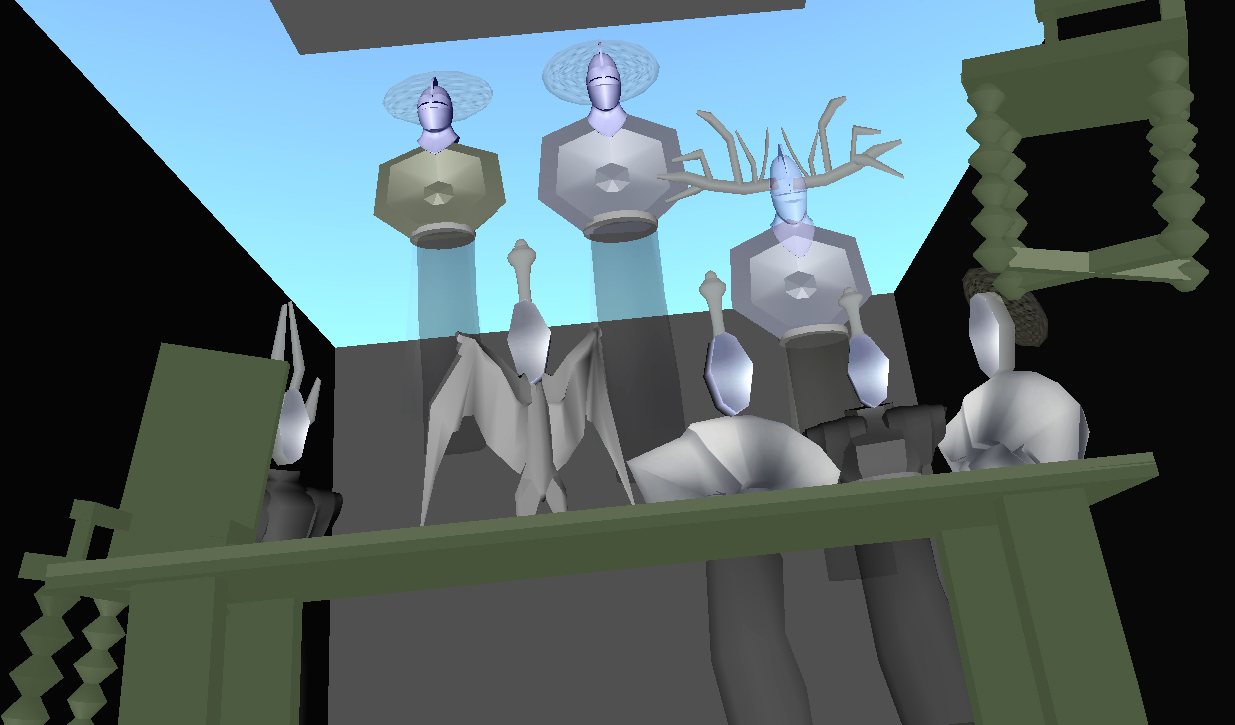
A movie still from Dynasty (2007-2009)

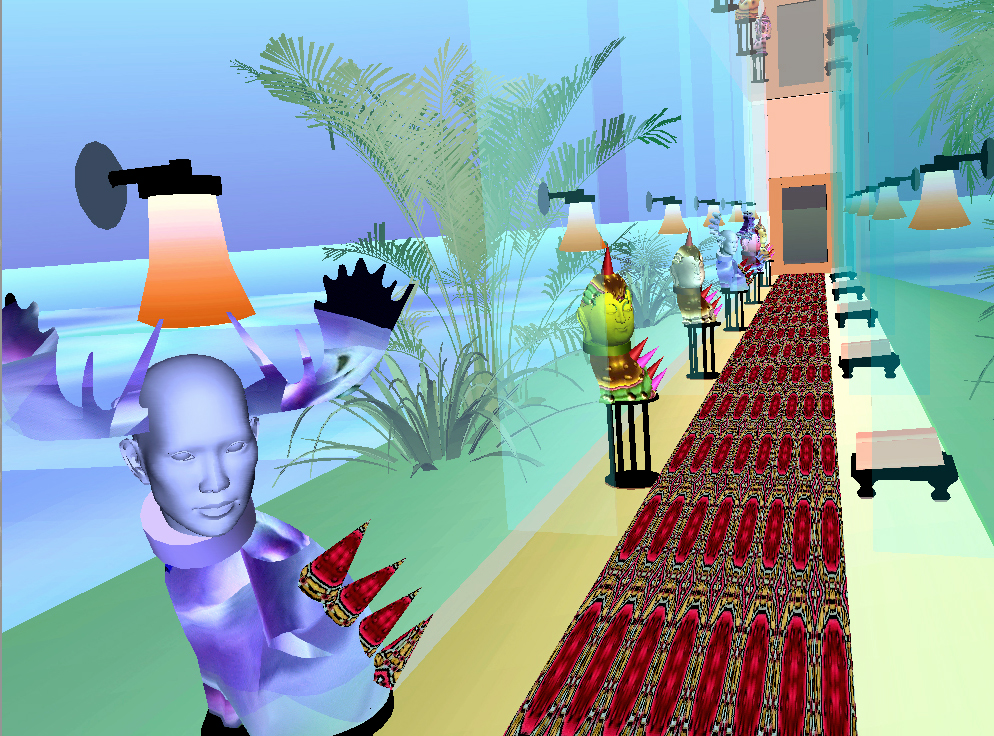
A movie still from The Isle That Was A Book (2011).

During the first decade of the 21st century, Stenger worked on a series of VRML movies and environments, which, though she had no more access to VR interfaces, were still conceived for immersion. In 2001, she created Chambers. The movie, completed days before 9/11, is an emotional journey through the different stages of a dying love. Towards the end of the decade, Stenger concluded her Virtual Reality trilogy with Dynasty (2007-2009). Dynasty is composed of 15 scenes with music by Tchaikovsky. The movie is a travel through time, in which users revisit their childhood and meet their ancestors from a remote past.

In 2011 Stenger completed The Isle That Was A Book, another VRML piece, based on a 1970s Beat Poetry book with 14 texts read by Stenger. In 2012, she composed a short story for Twitter called IS IT U, I U? (I U=Internet Unicorn). Her last published work is TheyNuked My Lettuce! (2012). Created in Machinima style, this 3D/2D animation is a cautionary tale on the effects of cyberwar on our daily lives. The Wish (2015) is Stenger's most recent VR film which incorporated music from Mozart and Victoria Mariano.

In 2016, Stenger began experimenting with moving past projects into Unity and Oculus for VR game exploration. The first release of this was the Dynasty Experience in 2016 which incorporated Stenger's film Dynasty (2007–2009) into the Oculus Rift platform for VR exploration. The process was also done with Angles (1989–1991) in 2017 and Chambers (2001) in 2018. In 2019, The Wish VR and The Isle VR were announced to be under development. The Wish VR part one and part two have been published on Stenger website in 2020. In 2021, Stenger's continues to focus on incorporating more of her previous VR films into VR related programs.

== Exhibitions ==
- SIGGRAPH 1992: Art Show (1992)
- Beaux Arts, Paris (1993 & 1994)
- Dotcom Gallery New York (1996)
- NTT Art Center, Tokyo (1997)
- Museum of Contemporary Art, Oslo (2003)
- "Celebrate" Java Museum 10 years, Cologne (2010)
- "Contemporary Women Artists on the Web" National Museum of Women in the Arts, Washington (2013)
