= Central Institute for the Deaf =

School in St. Louis, Missouri, U.S.

CID - Central Institute for the Deaf
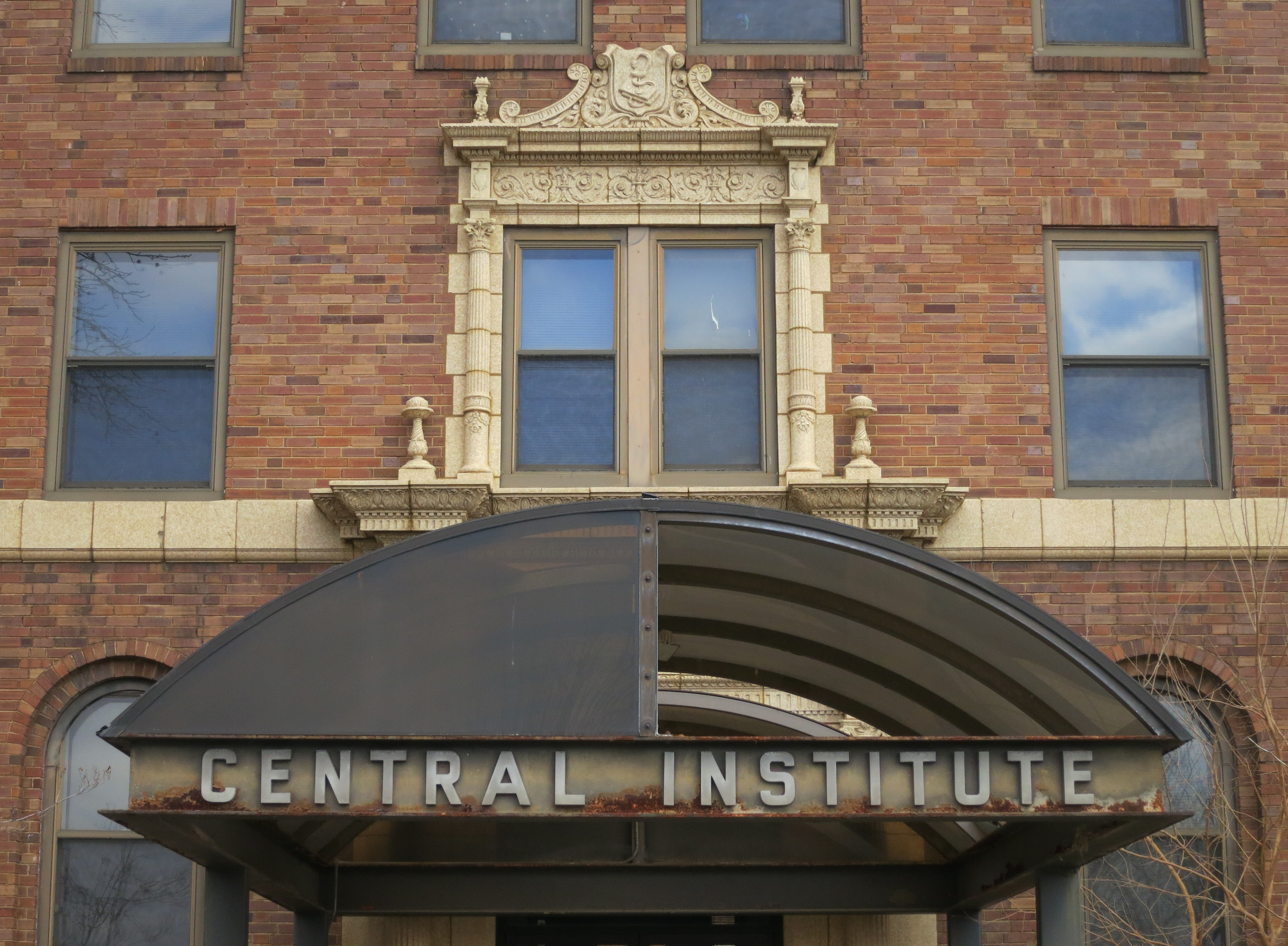

Location
- Saint Louis, Missouri 63110 38.632714°N 90.262967°W

Information
- Type: Listening and Spoken Language School for Children Who Are Deaf and Hard of Hearing
- Motto: Where Children Who Are Deaf and Hard of Hearing Learn to Listen, Talk, Read and Succeed
- Established: 1914
- Principal: Lynda Berkowitz, MSSH, CED, LSLS Cert. AVEd
- Affiliation: Washington University School of Medicine
- Executive Director: Heather Grantham, PhD
- Board President: Frank S. Childress
- Address: 825 S. Taylor Avenue Saint Louis, MO 63110
- Languages: English
- Website: www.cid.edu

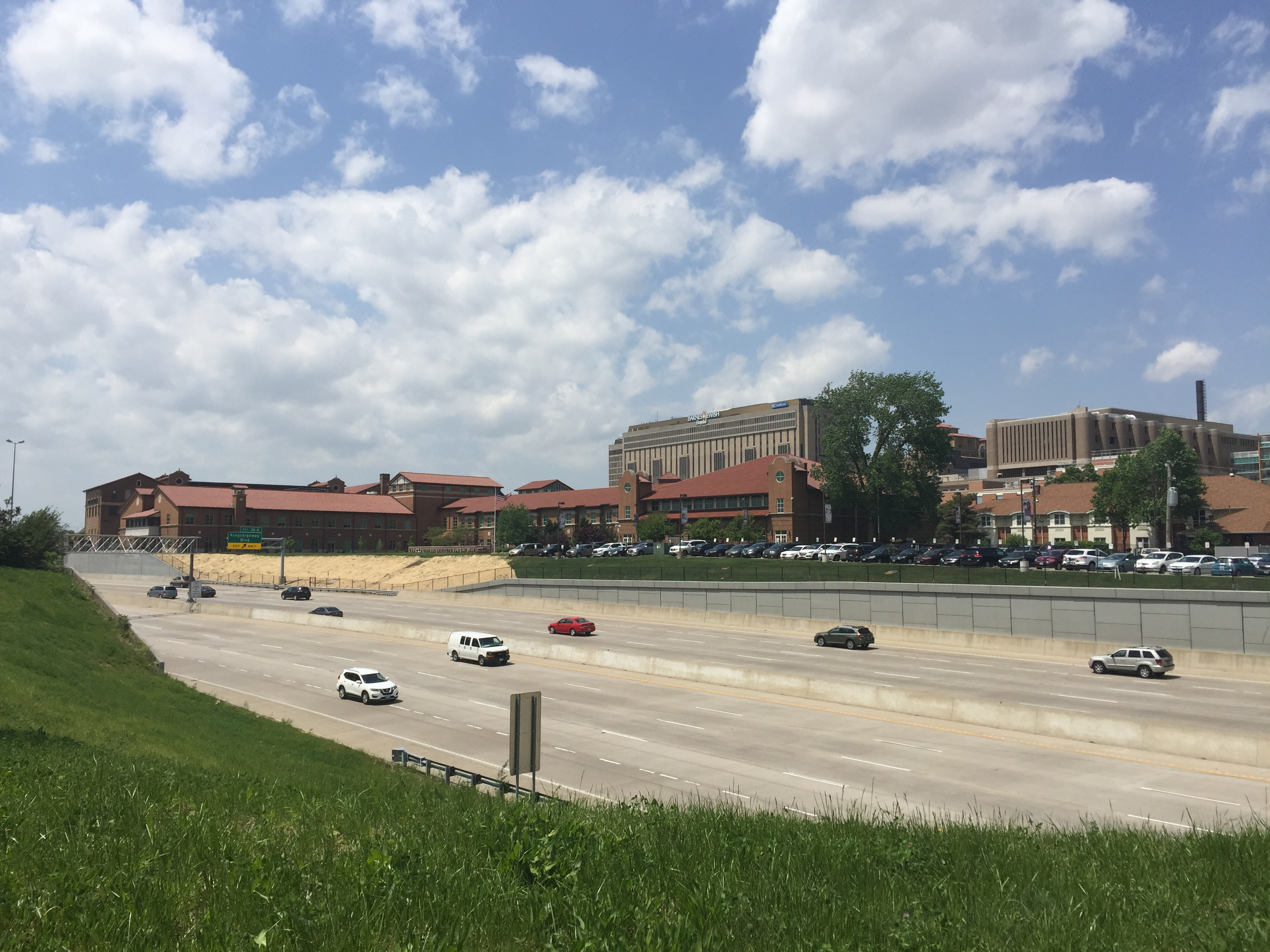
Central Institute for the Deaf as seen across I-64, May 2018

CID – Central Institute for the Deaf, located in St. Louis, Missouri, is an American program specializing in listening and spoken language (LSL) education for children who are deaf or hard of hearing from birth through elementary school. CID provides integrated early intervention, pediatric audiology, family coaching and school-age services grounded in research on listening and spoken language development.

CID's model emphasizes family-centered practice, individualized instruction and targeted support to help children develop strong spoken language and literacy skills. CID also advances the field through professional development, resources and training for early interventionists, educators, clinicians and listening and spoken language programs worldwide.

== History ==
CID was founded in 1914 by Max Aaron Goldstein, an ear, nose and throat physician, with the encouragement of his friend, deaf-blind activist Helen Keller. Goldstein set out to do what most thought was impossible at the time – teach deaf children to talk. Goldstein built on techniques he had learned at the Vienna Polyclinic in Austria from Victor Urbantschisch related to methods of teaching the deaf how to speak using "remnants" of hearing. When CID's new school building opened two years later, it had become enormously successful and its methods for speech and auditory training, now known as listening and spoken language, were groundbreaking.

Goldstein's vision included more than a school. He believed having physicians, teachers and researchers work side by side on issues related to hearing and deafness was essential. He began training teachers of the deaf in 1914. In 1931, that teacher training program affiliated with Washington University in St. Louis, becoming the first deaf education teacher training program in the country to be offered through a college or university.

The 1930s also saw the development of a research department that aimed to better understand the anatomy and science of hearing. Under the direction of Hallowell Davis, who came to CID from Harvard University, the research department would become world-renowned for its work related to hearing and deafness, attracting some of the world's top faculty over the next seven decades. Davis' early work there was done during World War II on behalf of the Veterans Administration, developing improved hearing aids for those who had sustained hearing loss in combat. This research laid the foundation for what would become the field of audiology.

It was in 1947 that CID established one of the country's first two university training programs in audiology, a PhD degree, through its affiliation with Washington University in St. Louis. Within a few months of each other, both CID/Washington University in St. Louis and Northwestern University had enrolled students and officially launched the country's academic training efforts in audiology. Both programs continue today as top-ranked leaders in audiology education. It was also in 1947 that CID added a master's program in deaf education, also the first such program in the country.

CID principals and clinical directors Helen S. Lane, Mildred McGinnis, Ann E. Geers, and Jean Moog were pioneers who made major contributions to listening and spoken language deaf education and audiological science. S. Richard Silverman, Donald Calvert, and Ira J. Hirsh, were among notable CID directors who moved the field forward during the decades after Goldstein's death.

In September 2003 in the wake of CID's financial difficulties, Washington University in St. Louis acquired the graduate education, adult clinical and research divisions, formalizing a longtime connection between the two institutions. These programs are today known as "CID at Washington University School of Medicine." Clinical and research programs are operated through the Department of Otolaryngology; the graduate education programs are operated through the Program in Audiology and Communication Sciences. The CID school remains a separate, non-profit agency focused on educating children who are deaf and hard of hearing, supporting their families and providing continuing education, consulting and resources for listening and spoken language professionals.

== Campus ==
The CID campus is located between Clayton Avenue and Interstate 64 in St. Louis's Central West End, south of the Washington University Medical School. The westernmost building of the complex is also the oldest, dating to 1928. CID's original 1916 building was torn down around 2000, when the modern portions of the complex were built. The 1928 building, designed by local architect William B. Ittner, was listed on the National Register of Historic Places in 2015 as a reminder of CID's early history. This building, located at 818 S. Euclid Ave., was ceded to Washington University, which later converted it to housing for medical students. CID's address is 825 S. Taylor Avenue, Saint Louis, MO 63110.

== Notable alumni ==
- T. Alan Hurwitz (born 1942), the tenth President of Gallaudet University (2010–2015).
- Heather Whitestone-McCallum attended CID from 1984 to 1987. In 1995, she became the first deaf woman to be crowned Miss America.
- Jeffrey Zuckerman, a profoundly deaf American literary translator. He began attending CID as a one-year-old in 1988 and spent eight years learning to listen and talk. After earning an English degree from Yale University, Zuckerman earned wide acclaim for his English translations of French fiction. In 2020, the French government named him a Chevalier dans l’ordre des Arts et des Lettres, the civilian equivalent of a knighthood for a man of letters.
