= HPV-positive oropharyngeal cancer =

Cancer of the throat

Human papillomavirus-positive oropharyngeal cancer
- Other names: HPV16+ oropharyngeal cancer, HPV16+OPC
- Microscope image of tumour showing HPV positivity by in situ hybridization
- Specialty: Oncology
- Symptoms: Sore or blister in back of the mouth, difficulty with speech, swallowing or breathing, swelling in the neck, loss of appetite, loss of weight, and weakness
- Causes: Human papilloma virus
- Risk factors: oral sexual contact
- Diagnostic method: Endoscopy, Biopsy, Staining for p16, CT Scan,
- Differential diagnosis: Tobacco associated oropharyngeal cancer
- Prevention: Vaccination
- Treatment: Surgery, radiation, chemotherapy
- Frequency: 22,000 cases globally (2008)

Human papillomavirus-positive oropharyngeal cancer (HPV-positive OPC or HPV+OPC), is a cancer (squamous cell carcinoma) of the throat caused by the human papillomavirus type 16 virus (HPV16). In the past, cancer of the oropharynx (throat) was associated with the use of alcohol or tobacco or both, but the majority of cases are now associated with the HPV virus, acquired by having oral contact with the genitals (oral-genital sex) of a person who has a genital HPV infection. Risk factors include having a large number of sexual partners, a history of oral-genital sex or anal–oral sex, having a female partner with a history of either an abnormal Pap smear or cervical dysplasia, having chronic periodontitis, and, among men, younger age at first intercourse and a history of genital warts. HPV-positive OPC is considered a separate disease from HPV-negative oropharyngeal cancer (also called HPV negative-OPC and HPV-OPC).

HPV-positive OPC presents in one of four ways: as an asymptomatic abnormality in the mouth found by the patient or a health professional such as a dentist; with local symptoms such as pain or infection at the site of the tumor; with difficulties of speech, swallowing, and/or breathing; or as a swelling in the neck if the cancer has spread to local lymph nodes. Detection of a tumour suppressor protein, known as p16, is commonly used to diagnose an HPV-associated OPC. The extent of disease is described in the standard cancer staging system, using the AJCC TNM system, based on the T stage (size and extent of tumor), N stage (extent of involvement of regional lymph nodes) and M stage (whether there is spread of the disease outside the region or not), and combined into an overall stage from I–IV. In 2016, a separate staging system was developed for HPV+OPC, distinct from HPV-OPC.

Whereas most head and neck cancers have been declining as smoking rates have declined, HPV-positive OPC has been increasing. Compared to HPV-OPC patients, HPV-positive patients tend to be younger, have a higher socioeconomic status and are less likely to smoke. In addition, they tend to have smaller tumours, but are more likely to have involvement of the cervical lymph nodes. In the United States and other countries, the number of cases of oropharyngeal cancer has been increasing steadily, with the incidence of HPV-positive OPC increasing faster than the decline in HPV-negative OPC. The increase is seen particularly in young men in developed countries, and HPV-positive OPC now accounts for the majority of all OPC cases. Efforts are being made to reduce the incidence of HPV-positive OPC by introducing vaccination that includes HPV types 16 and 18, found in 95% of these cancers, before exposure to the virus. Early data suggest a reduction in infection rates.

In the past, the treatment of OPC was radical surgery, with an approach through the neck and splitting of the jaw bone, which resulted in morbidity and poor survival rates. Later, radiotherapy with or without the addition of chemotherapy, provided a less disfiguring alternative, but with comparable poor outcomes. Now, newer minimally invasive surgical techniques through the mouth have improved outcomes; in high-risk cases, this surgery is often followed by radiation and/or chemotherapy. In the absence of high-quality evidence regarding which treatment provides the best outcomes, management decisions are often based on one or more of the following: technical factors, likely functional loss, and patient preference. The presence of HPV in the tumour is associated with a better response to treatment and a better outcome, independent of the treatment methods used, and a nearly 60% reduced risk of dying from the cancer. Most recurrence occurs locally and within the first year after treatment. The use of tobacco decreases the chances of survival.

== Signs and symptoms ==
HPV+OPC may presents in one of four ways:

1. As an asymptomatic abnormality in the mouth found by the patient or a health professional such as a dentist. This may include painless masses, discolorations or patches along the tongue, jaw or throat,
2. Local symptoms such as pain or infection at the site of the tumor, persistent sore throat, dull aches in the ear (this is from referred pain from a primary tumor), asymmetric tonsil swelling, spitting up blood.
3. Difficulties of speech, swallowing, and/or breathing. This can include persistent coughing, hoarseness of the voice, difficulty with opening the mouth, or difficulty with moving the tongue.
4. Swelling in the neck (if the cancer has spread to lymph nodes). These may be accompanied by more general symptoms such as loss of appetite, weight loss, and weakness.

Patients may also note discolorations of the mouth such as leukoplakia (white or gray areas that remain unchanged when scraped), erythroplakia (raised red areas that bleed if scraped), or erythroleukoplakia (white and red patches) that may represent precancerous lesions and should be assessed.

== Cause ==
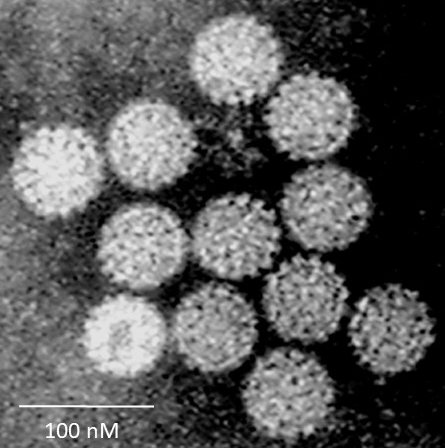
Electron micrograph of Human Papilloma Viruses

Most mucosal squamous cell head and neck cancers, including oropharyngeal cancer (OPC), have historically been attributed to tobacco and alcohol use. However, this pattern has changed considerably since the 1980s. It was realised that some cancers occur in the absence of these risk factors, and an association between human papillomavirus (HPV) and various squamous cell cancers, including OPC, was first described in 1983. Since then, both molecular and epidemiological evidence has been accumulating, with the International Agency for Research on Cancer (IARC) stating that high-risk HPV types 16 and 18 are carcinogenic in humans in 1995, and in 2007 that HPV was a cause for oral cancers. Human papillomavirus (HPV)-positive cancer (HPV+OPC) incidence has been increasing while HPV-negative (HPV-OPC) cancer incidence is declining, a trend that is estimated to rise further in coming years. Since there are marked differences in clinical presentation and treatment relative to HPV status, HPV+OPC is now viewed as a distinct biologic and clinical condition.

Human HPV has long been implicated in the pathogenesis of several anogenital cancers including those of the anus, vulva, vagina, cervix, and penis. In 2007, it was also implicated by both molecular and epidemiological evidence in cancers arising outside of the anogenital tract, namely oral cancers. HPV infection is common among healthy individuals and is acquired through oral sex. Although less data is available, the prevalence of HPV infection is at least as common among men as among women, with 2004 estimates of about 27% among US women aged 14–59.

HPV oral infection precedes the development of HPV+OPC. Slight injuries in the mucous membrane serve as an entry gate for HPV, which thus works into the basal layer of the epithelium. People testing positive for HPV type 16 virus (HPV16) oral infection have a 14 times increased risk of developing HPV+OPC. Immunosuppression seems to be an increased risk factor for HPV+OPC. Individuals with TGF-β1 genetic variations, specially T869C, are more likely to have HPV16+OPC. TGF-β1 plays an important role in controlling the immune system. In 1993 it was noted that patients with human papillomavirus (HPV)-associated anogenital cancers had a 4-fold increased risk of tonsillar squamous-cell carcinoma. Although evidence suggests that HPV16 is the main cause of OPC in humans not exposed to smoking and alcohol, the degree to which tobacco and/or alcohol use may contribute to increasing the risk of HPV+OPC has not always been clear but it appears that both smoking and HPV infection are independent and additive risk factors for developing OPC. The connection between HPV-infection and oropharyngeal cancer is stronger in regions of lymphoepithelial tissue (base of tongue and palatine tonsils) than in regions of stratified squamous epithelium (soft palate and uvula). Human herpesvirus-8 infection can potentiate the effects of HPV-16.

== Risk factors ==
Risk factors include a high number of sexual partners (25% increase >= 6 partners), a history of oral-genital sex (125% >= 4 partners), or anal–oral sex, a female partner with a history of either an abnormal Pap smear or cervical dysplasia, chronic periodontitis, and, among men, decreasing age at first intercourse and history of genital warts.

== Pathology ==
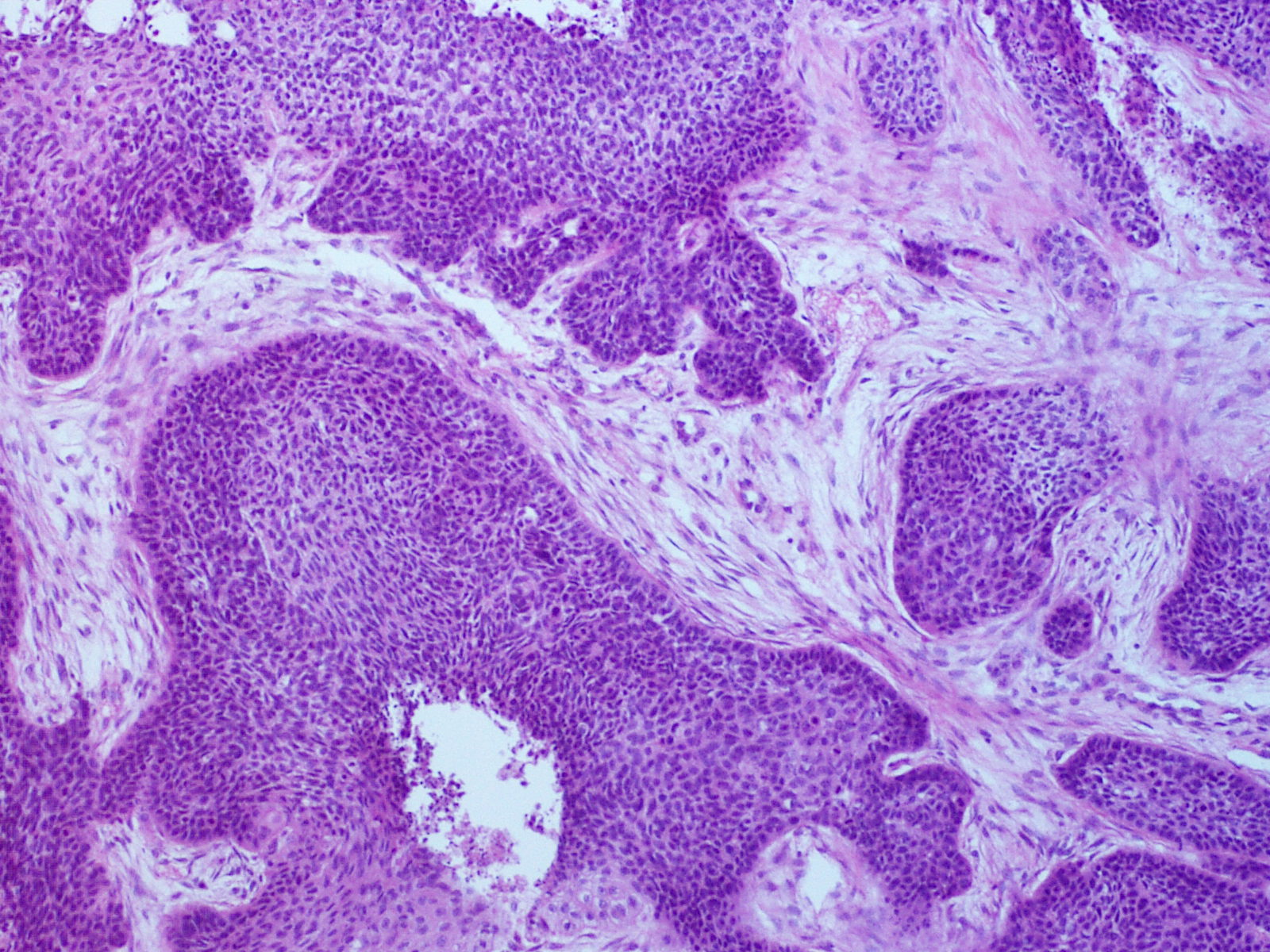
Basaloid pattern of squamous cell cancer

Cancers of the oropharynx primarily arise in lingual and palatine tonsil lymphoid tissue that is lined by respiratory squamous mucosal epithelium, which may be invaginated within the lymphoid tissue. Therefore, the tumour first arises in hidden crypts. OPC is graded based on the degree of squamous and keratin differentiation into well, moderate, or poorly (high) differentiated grades. Other pathological features include the presence of finger-like invasion, perineural invasion, depth of invasion, and distance of the tumour from resection margins. Phenotypic variants include basaloid squamous carcinoma, a high-grade form (see Chung Fig. 35-3(C) and illustration here). They are most commonly non-keratinising. HPV+OPC also differs from HPV-OPC in being focal rather than multifocal and not being associated with pre-malignant dysplasia. HPV+OPC patients are therefore at less risk of developing other malignancies in the head and neck region, unlike other head and neck primary tumours that may have associated second neoplasms, that may occur at the same time (synchronous) or a distant time (metachronous), both within the head and neck region or more distantly. This suggests that the oncogenic alterations produced by the virus are spatially limited rather than related to a field defect.

=== Anatomy ===
Anatomy of oropharynx and surrounding structures
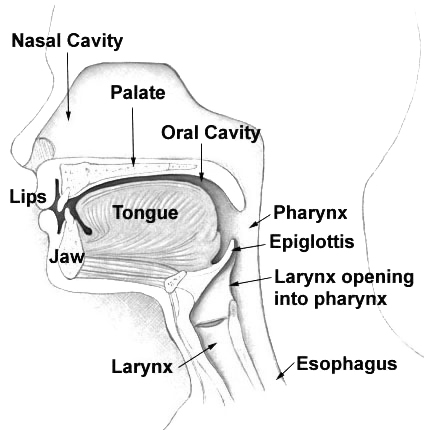
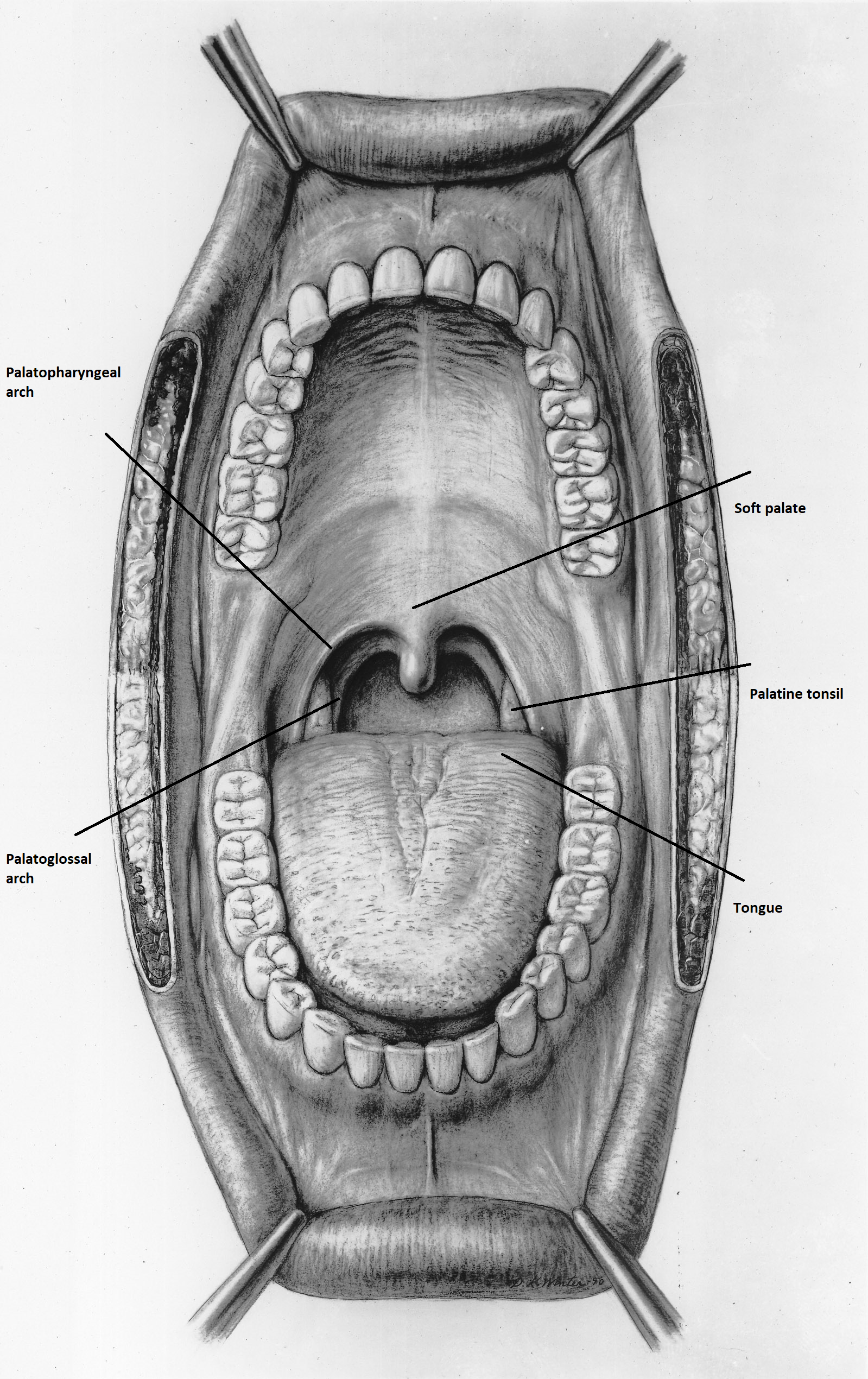
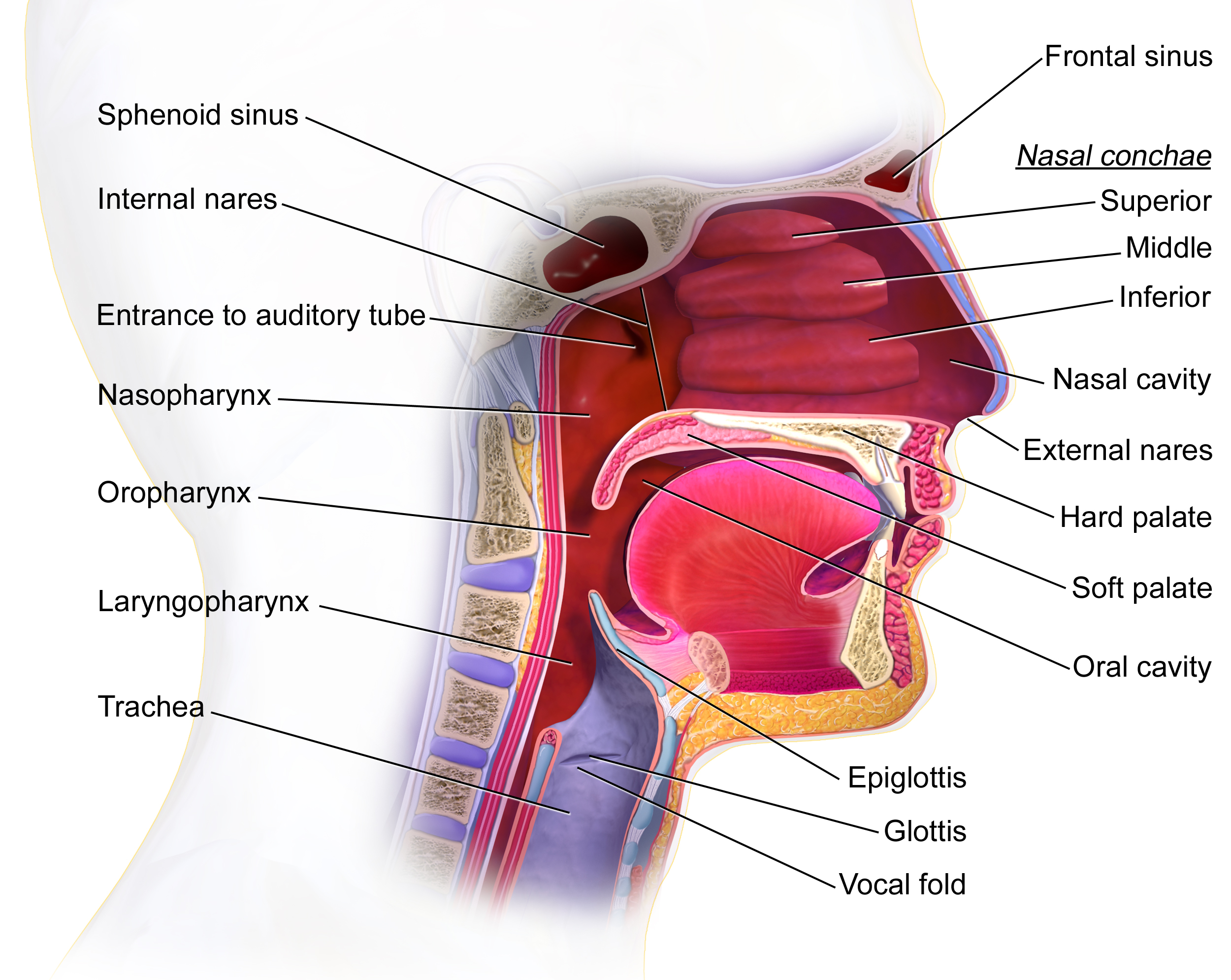

The oropharynx, at the back of the mouth, forms a circle and includes the base of the tongue (posterior third) below, the tonsils on each side, and the soft palate above, together with the walls of the pharynx, including the anterior epiglottis, epiglottic valleculae and branchial cleft at its base. The oropharynx is one of three divisions of the interior of the pharynx based on their relation to adjacent structures (nasal pharynx (nasopharynx), oral pharynx (oropharynx) and laryngeal pharynx (laryngopharynx – also referred to as the hypopharynx), from top to bottom). The pharynx is a semicircular fibromuscular tube joining the nasal cavities above to the larynx (voice box) and oesophagus (gullet), below, where the larynx is situated in front of the oesophagus.

The oropharynx lies between the mouth (oral cavity) in the front and the laryngopharynx below, which separates it from the larynx. The upper limit of the oropharynx is marked by the soft palate and its lower limit by the epiglottis and root of the tongue. The oropharynx communicates with the mouth, in front through what is known as the oropharyngeal isthmus, or isthmus of the fauces. The isthmus (i.e., connection) is formed above by the soft palate, below by the posterior third of the tongue, and at the sides by the palatoglossal arches. The posterior third of the tongue or tongue base contains numerous follicles of lymphatic tissue that form the lingual tonsils. Adjacent to the tongue base, the lingual surface of the epiglottis, which curves forward, is attached to the tongue by median and lateral glossoepiglottic folds. The folds form small troughs known as the epiglottic valleculae. The lateral walls are marked by two vertical pillars on each side, the pillars of the fauces, or palatoglossal arches. More properly they are separately named the palatoglossal arch anteriorly and the palatopharyngeal arch posteriorly. The anterior arch is named from the palatoglossal muscle within, running from the soft palate to the tongue (glossus), while the posterior arch similarly contains the palatopharyngeal muscle running from the soft palate to the lateral pharynx. Between the arches lies a triangular space, the tonsillar fossa in which lies the palatine tonsil, another lymphoid organ.

The external pharyngeal walls, consisting of the four constrictor muscles, form part of the mechanism of swallowing. The microscopic anatomy is composed of four layers, from the lumen outwards, the mucosa, submucosa, muscles, and the fibrosa, or fibrous layer. The mucosa consists of stratified squamous epithelium, which is generally non-keratinised, except when exposed to chronic irritants such as tobacco smoke. The submucosa contains aggregates of lymphoid tissue.

=== Patterns of spread ===
Cancers arising in the tonsillar fossa spread to the cervical lymph nodes, primarily the subdigastric (upper jugular) lymph nodes (level II), with secondary involvement of the mid (level III) and low (level IV) jugular nodes and sometimes the posterior cervical nodes (level V). Base of tongue cancers spread to the subdigastric and mid jugular nodes, and occasionally posterior cervical nodes, but being closer to the midline, are more likely to have bilateral nodal disease. Tonsillar cancers rarely spread to the contralateral side unless they involve the midline.

=== Mechanism ===
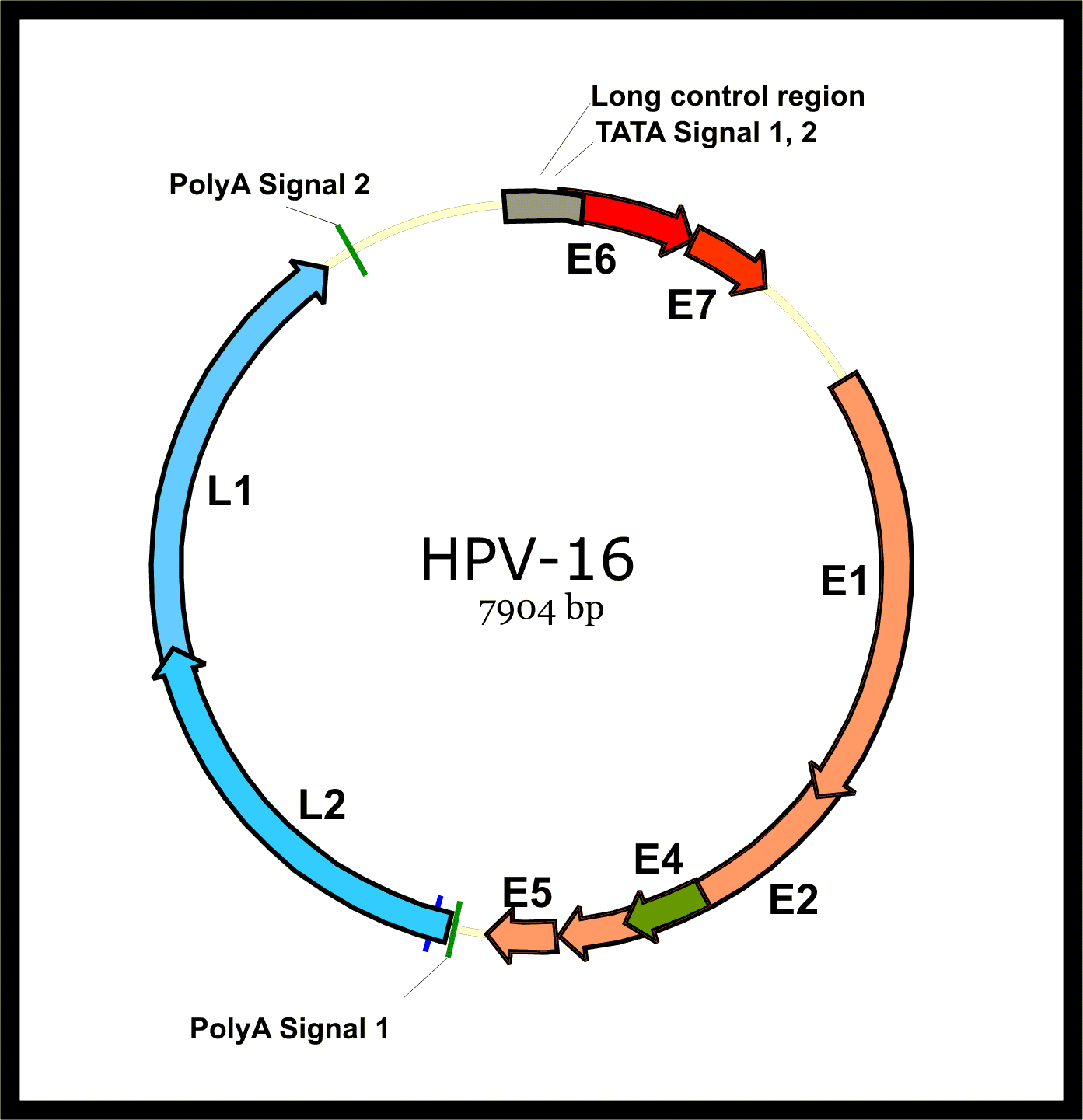
Genomic structure of HPV

==== Virology ====
HPV-associated cancers are caused by high-risk strains of HPV, mainly HPV-16 and HPV-18. HPV is a small non-enveloped DNA virus of the papillomavirus family. Its genome encodes the early (E) oncoproteins E5, E6 and E7 and the late (L) capsid proteins L1 and L2. The virus gains access to the mucosa through microlesions, where it infects the basal layer of cells, which are still able to proliferate. While the virus does not replicate in these cells, expression of its early genes stimulates proliferation and lateral expansion of the basal cells. As this moves the virus particles into the overlying suprabasal layers, late viral gene expression occurs, enabling replication of the circular viral genome (see figure) and structural proteins. As these are pushed into the most superficial mucosal layers, complete viral particles are assembled and released.

==== Oncogenesis ====
An increased risk of HPV+OPC is observed more than 15 years after HPV exposure, pointing to a slow development of the disease, similar to that seen in cervical cancer. Relative to HPV-OPC, the oncogenic molecular progression of HPV+OPC is poorly understood. The two main viral oncoproteins of the high risk HPV types are E6 and E7. These are consistently expressed in malignant cell lines, and if their expression is inhibited the malignant phenotype of the cancer cells is blocked. Either of these oncoproteins can immortalise cell lines, but are more efficient when both are expressed since their separate molecular roles are synergistic. The E6 and E7 oncogenes become integrated into host-cell DNA, and the oncoproteins they express interfere with a variety of predominantly antiproliferative cellular regulatory mechanisms. They bind to and inactivate the best known of these mechanisms, the tumor suppressor proteins p53 and retinoblastoma protein pRB (pRb) leading to genomic instability and then cell cycle deregulation (see Chung et al., 2016 Fig. 35.2). Further, yet to be elicited, mechanisms are required for the final steps of malignant transformation of HPV infected cells.

HPV- and HPV+OPC are distinguishable at the molecular level. The naturally occurring (wild type) p53 is widely involved in cellular processes, including autophagy, response to DNA damage, cell cycle regulation, and senescence, apoptosis and the generation of adenosine triphosphate (ATP) through oxidative phosphorylation. The gene encoding p53 is inactivated by E6 at the protein level and is found as the wild type in HPV+OPC but mutated in HPV-OPC. In HPV+OPC p53 protein undergoes accelerated degradation by E6, drastically reducing its levels, while in HPV-OPC it undergoes genetic mutation, which may result in synthesis of an abnormal p53 protein, that may not only be inactive as a tumour suppressor but can also bind and inactivate any non-mutated wild type p53, with an increase in oncogenic activity. Although p53 mutations occur in HPV+OPC, they are far less common than in HPV-OPC (26% vs 48%), and do not appear to affect clinical outcome.

The pRb protein is inactivated by E7 in HPV+OPC, but in HPV-OPC, it is the p16 tumour suppressor part of the pRb tumour suppressor network that is inactivated. Also the pRb pathway is inactivated by E7 instead of Cyclin D1 amplification. CDKN2A is a tumour suppressor gene that encodes a tumor suppressor protein, p16 (cyclin-dependent kinase inhibitor 2A) and inhibits the kinase activity of the cyclin-dependent kinases CDK4 and CDK6, which in turn induce cell cycle arrest. p16 expression is cell cycle-dependent and is expressed focally in only about 5–10% of normal squamous epithelium. Like most HPV+ cancers, HPV+OPC express p16 but the latter does not function as a tumour-suppressor, because the mechanism by which this is achieved, pRb, has been inactivated by E7. p16 is upregulated (over-expressed) due to E7-related loss of pRB with reduced negative feedback, whereas it is downregulated in up to 90% of HPV-OPC. This diffuse over-expression in the tumour cells provides a diagnostic marker for HPV involvement. Although HPV E6 and E7 reduce tumour suppressor activity, they do so less than genetic and epigenetic processes do in HPV-OPC.

The tonsillar epithelia (palatine and lingual) share similar nonkeratinization characteristics with the cervix, where HPV infection plays the major role in cases of cervical cancer. Also E6 and E7 may make HPV+OPC more immunogenic than HPV-OPC, since anti-E6 and E7 antibodies may be detected in these patients. This, in turn, could restrict the malignant behaviour of HPV+OPC, and the presence of antibodies has been associated with a better prognosis, while treatment may enhance the immunogenicity of the tumour, and hence improve response, although to what extent is not clear. Outcomes are also associated with improved adaptive immunity.

== Diagnosis ==
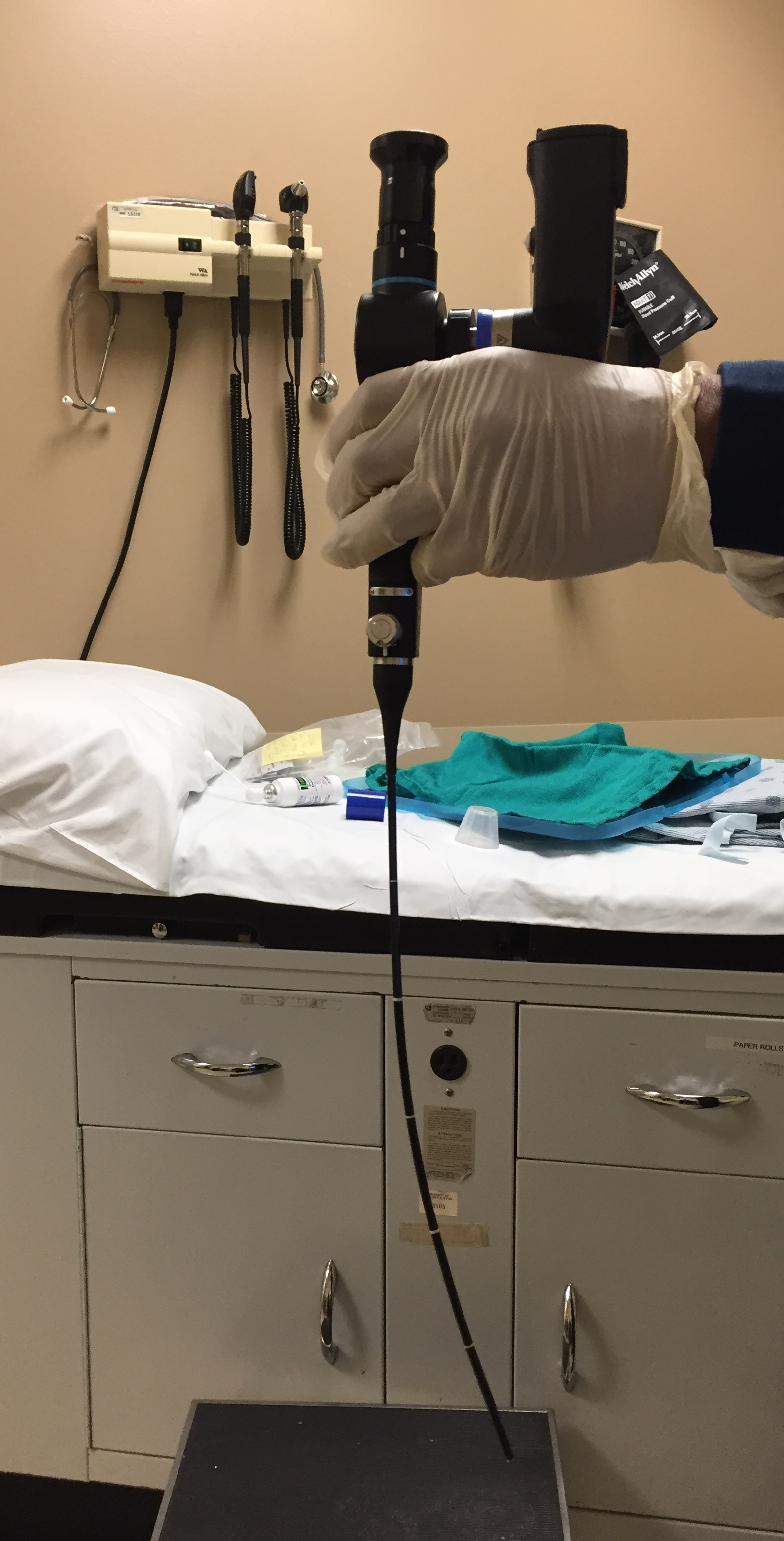
Rhinoscope used in diagnosis and surveillance

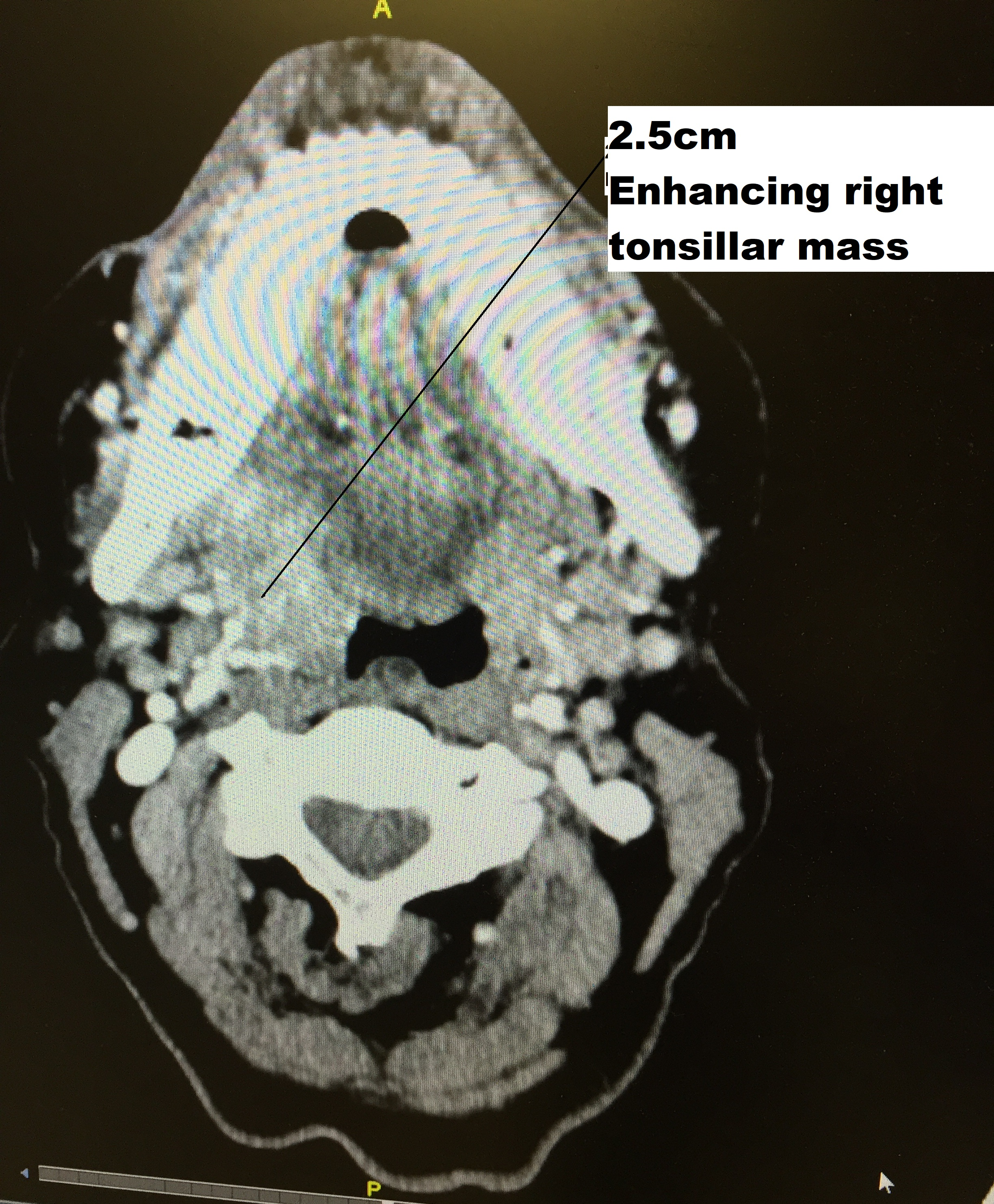
CT scan in transverse plane, viewed from below, showing a contrast-enhancing right tonsil mass due to HPV+OPC

=== Biopsy ===
Initial diagnosis requires visualisation of the tumour either through the mouth or endoscopically through the nose using a rhinoscope, illustrated to the right, followed by biopsy.

=== Differentiating HPV+OPC from HPV-OPC ===
HPV+OPC is usually diagnosed at a more advanced stage than HPV-OPC, with 75–90% having involvement of regional lymph nodes. Furthermore, HPV+OPC is more likely to be poorly differentiated with nonkeratinized or basaloid cells.

Genetic signatures of HPV+ and HPV- OPC are different. HPV+OPC is associated with expression level of the E6/E7 mRNAs and of p16. HPV16 E6/E7-positive cases are histopathologically characterized by their verrucous or papillary (nipple like) structure and koilocytosis of the adjacent mucosa. Approximately 15% of HNSCCs are caused by HPV16 infection and the subsequent constitutive expression of E6 and E7, and some HPV-initiated tumors may lose their original characteristics during tumor progression. High-risk HPV types may be associated with oral carcinoma, by cell-cycle control dysregulation, contributing to oral carcinogenesis and the overexpression of mdm2, p27, and cathepsin B.

HPV+OPC is not merely characterized by the presence of HPV-16: only the expression of viral oncogenes within the tumor cells, plus the serum presence of E6 or E7 antibodies, is unambiguously conclusive for HPV+OPC.

There is no standard HPV testing method in head and neck cancers, both in situ hybridization (ISH) and polymerase chain reaction (PCR) are commonly used. Both methods have comparable performance for HPV detection; however, it is important to use appropriate sensitivity controls. Immunohistochemistry (IHC) staining of the tissue for p16 is frequently used as a cost-effective surrogate for HPV in OPC, compared to ISH or PCR. There is a small incidence of HPV-negative p16-positive disease, accounting for about 5% of HPV-OPC.

== Staging ==
Staging is generally by the UICC/AJCC TNM (Tumour, Nodes, Metastases) system. Staging is based on clinical examination, diagnostic imaging, and pathology. On imaging, involved lymph nodes may appear cystic, a characteristic of HPV+OPC.

HPV+OPC has been treated similarly to stage-matched and site-matched HPV-unrelated OPC. Its unique features, which contrast with smoking-related HPV-OPC head and neck cancers, for which patients' demographics, comorbidities, risk factors, and carcinogenesis differ markedly, suggest that a distinct staging system be developed to more appropriately represent the severity of the disease and its prognosis. Standard AJCC TNM staging, such as the seventh edition (2009), while predictive for HPV-OPC, has no prognostic value in HPV+OPC. The 8th edition of the AJCC TNM Staging Manual (2016) incorporates this specific staging for HPV+OPC. As of 2018, treatment guidelines are evolving to account for the different outcomes observed in HPV+OPC. Consequently, less intensive (de-intensification) use of radiotherapy or chemotherapy, as well as specific therapy, is under investigation, enrolling HPV+OPC in clinical trials to preserve disease control and minimise morbidity in selected groups based on modified TNM staging and smoking status.

HPV+ cancer of the oropharynx are staged as (AJCC 8th ed. 2016): Tumour stage

- T0 no primary identified
- T1 2 cm or less in greatest dimension
- T2 2–4 cm
- T3 >4 cm, or extension to the lingual surface of the epiglottis
- T4 moderately advanced local disease, invading larynx, extrinsic muscle of tongue, medial pterygoid, hard palate, mandible, or beyond

Nodal stage

- Nx regional lymph nodes cannot be assessed
- N0 no regional lymph nodes involved
- N1 one or more ipsilateral nodes involved, less than 6 cm
- N2 contralateral or bilateral lymph nodes, less than 6 cm
- N3 lymph node(s) larger than 6 cm

Clinical stage

- Stage I: T0N1, T1–2N0–1
- Stage II: T0N2, T1–3N2, T3N0–2
- Stage III: T0–3N3, T4N0-3
- Stage IV: any metastases (M1)

However, the published literature and ongoing clinical trials use the older seventh edition that does not distinguish between HPV+OPC and HPV-OPC – see Oropharyngeal Cancer – Stages. The T stages are essentially similar between AJCC 7 and AJCC 8. with two exceptions. Tis (carcinoma in situ) has been eliminated, and the division of T4 into substages (e.g., T4a) has been removed. The major changes are in the N stages, and hence the overall clinical stage. N0 remains the same, but as with the T stage, substages such as N2a have been eliminated. Extracapsular extension (ECE), also referred to as extranodal extension (ENE), which is invasion by the tumour beyond the capsule of the lymph node, has been eliminated as a staging criterion. (Note: N stage, AJCC 7th ed. N1: one ipsilateral node involved, 3 cm or smaller, ECE negative (ECE−) N2a: one ipsilateral node 3–6 cm, ECE− N2b: more than one ipsilateral node, less than 6 cm, ECE− N2c: bilateral nodes, less than 6 cm, ECE− N3a: any lymph node larger than 6 cm, ECE− N3b: any lymph node ECE+)

This results in an HPV+OPC tumour being given a lower stage than if it were HPV-OPC. For instance, a 5 cm tumour with one ipsilateral node involved that is 5 cm in size but has ECE would be considered T3N3bM0 Stage IVB if HPV- but T3N1M0 Stage II if HPV+.

== Prevention ==
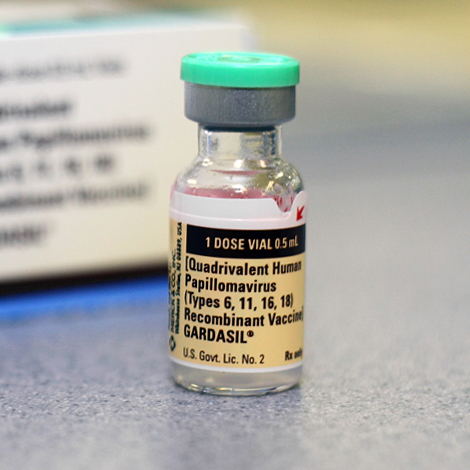
Vial of HPV vaccine

=== Avoiding exposure ===
Prevention of HPV+OPC involves avoiding or reducing exposure to risk factors where possible.

=== Vaccination ===
About 90% of HPV+OPC carry HPV 16, and another 5% HPV 18. These two types are both targets of available vaccines. HPV vaccines given before exposure can prevent persistent genital infection and the consequent precancerous state. Therefore, they have a theoretical potential to prevent oral HPV infection. A 2010 review study has found that HPV16 oral infection was rare (1.3%) among the 3,977 healthy subjects analyzed.

== Treatment ==
The goals of treatment are to optimise survival and locoregional disease control, and prevent spread to distant areas of the body (metastasis), while minimising short- and long-term morbidity. There is no high quality Level I evidence from prospective clinical trials in HPV+OPC, therefore treatment guidelines must rely on data from treatment of OPC in general and from some retrospective unplanned subsetting of those studies, together with data for head and neck cancer in general. Treatment for OPC has traditionally relied on radiotherapy, chemotherapy, and/or other systemic treatments, and surgical resection. Depending on the stage and other factors, treatment may include a combination of modalities. The mainstay has been radiotherapy in most cases. a pooled analysis of published studies suggested comparable disease control between radiation and surgery, but higher complication rates for surgery +/− radiation. Ideally a single modality approach is preferred since triple modality is associated with much more toxicity and a multidisciplinary team in a large centre with high patient volumes is recommended.

Differences in response to treatment between HPV-OPC and HPV+OPC may include differences in the extent and manner in which cellular growth-regulatory pathways are altered in the two forms of OPC. For instance, in HPV+OPC, the HPV E6 and E7 oncogenes merely render the p53 and pRb pathways dormant, leaving open the possibility of reactivation of these pathways by down-regulating (reducing) expression of the oncogenes. This is in contrast to the mutant form of p53 found in HPV-OPC, which is associated with treatment resistance. Furthermore, it is suggested that the effects of E6 and E7 on these pathways render the tumour more radiosensitive, possibly by interference with mechanisms such as DNA repair, repopulation signalling, and cell-cycle redistribution. The microenvironment is also important, with radiation increasing host immune response to viral antigens expressed on the tumour. Also, there is an association between an increase in tumour-infiltrating lymphocytes and in circulating white blood cells in HPV+OPC patients and better prognosis. This implies a role for an adaptive immune system in suppressing tumour progression.

=== Surgery ===
Historically, surgery provided a single approach to head and neck cancer. Surgical management of OPC carries significant morbidity with a transcervical (through the neck) approach, often involving mandibulotomy, in which the jawbone (mandible) is split. This is referred to as an open surgical technique. Consequently, surgical approaches declined in favour of radiation. In the United States, the use of surgery declined from 41% of cases in 1998 to 30% by 2009, the year that the Food and Drug Administration approved the use of the newer techniques.

These improvements in surgical techniques have allowed many tumours to be resected (removed) by transoral (through the mouth) surgical approaches (TOS), using transoral endoscopic head and neck surgery (HNS). Consequently, surgery became used more, increasing to 35% of cases by 2012. This approach has proven safety, efficacy and tolerability, and includes two main minimally invasive techniques, transoral robotic surgery (TORS) and transoral laser microsurgery (TLM). No direct comparisons of these two techniques have been conducted, and clinical trials in head and neck cancer such as ECOG 3311 allow either. They are associated with substantial postoperative morbidity, depending on the extent of resection but compared to older techniques have a shorter hospital stay, faster recovery, less pain, and less need for gastrostomy or tracheostomy, and less long-term effects, which are minimal in the absence of postoperative radiation (RT), or chemoradiation (CRT). TORS has the practical advantage that angled telescopes and rotating robotic surgical arms provide better line of sight. Outcomes of minimally invasive procedures also compare favourably with more invasive ones. In early-stage disease, including involvement of neck nodes, TORS produces a 2-year survival of 80–90%. TLM is similarly reported to have a five-year survival of 78% and local control rates of 85–97%. In addition to early disease, minimally invasive surgery has been used in advanced cases, with up to 90% local control and disease-specific survival. Postoperative swallowing was excellent in 87%, but long-term dysphagia was associated with larger (T4) cancers, especially if involving the base of the tongue.

The details of the surgical approach depend on the location and size of the primary tumour and its N stage. Neck dissection to examine the draining lymph nodes may be carried out simultaneously or as a second staging procedure. For tumours of the tonsil and lateral pharyngeal wall, and clinically node-negative (N0) disease, dissection of the neck typically involves levels 2–4 (see diagram in Dubner 2017) ipsilaterally. Where nodes are involved clinically, dissection will depend on the location and size of the node or nodes. In the case of tongue base primaries, close to the midline, bilateral dissection is recommended.

==== Pathological staging ====
An advantage of a primary surgical approach is the amount of pathological information made available, including grade, margin status, and degree of involvement of lymph nodes. This may change the staging, as up to 40% of patients may have a different postoperative pathological stage compared to their preoperative clinical stage. In one study, 24% had their stage reduced (downstaged), which may impact subsequent decision making, including a reduction in intensity and morbidity. In the United Kingdom, the Royal College of Pathologists (1998) (Note: Revised 3rd edition, 2013) has standardised the reporting of surgical margins, with two categories, "mucosal" and "deep", and for each created groups based on the microscopic distance from invasive cancer to the margin, as follows: more than 5 mm (clear), 1–5 mm (close) and less than 1 mm (involved).

==== Adjuvant postoperative therapy ====
Data on the use of postoperative radiation therapy (PORT) is largely confined to historical or retrospective studies rather than high quality randomized clinical trials and are based on the overall population of patients with head and neck cancer, rather than specific studies of HPV+OPC, which would have formed a very small proportion of the population studied. Despite surgical excision, in the more advanced cases, local and regional recurrence of the cancer, together with spread outside of the head and neck region (metastases), are frequent. The risk of subsequent recurrent disease has been considered highest in those tumours where the pathology shows tumour at the margins of the resection (positive margins), multiple involved regional lymph nodes, and extension of the tumour outside of the capsule of the lymph node (extracapsular extension), based on historical experience with head and neck cancer. PORT was introduced in the 1950s in an attempt to reduce treatment failure from surgery alone. Although never tested in a controlled setting, PORT has been widely adopted for this purpose. In an analysis of surgical treatment failure at Memorial Sloan-Kettering Cancer Center, patients treated with surgery alone between 1960 and 1970 had failure rates of 39 and 73% for those with negative and positive surgical margins, respectively. These were compared to those who received PORT (with or without chemotherapy) from 1975 to 1980. The latter group had lower failure rates of 2% and 11% respectively. In addition, one randomised study from the 1970s (RTOG 73–03) compared preoperative radiation to PORT, and found lower failure rates with the latter.

The addition of another modality of treatment is referred to as adjuvant (literally helping) therapy, compared to its use as the initial (primary) therapy, also referred to as radical therapy. Consequently, many of these patients have been treated with adjuvant radiation, with or without chemotherapy. In the above series of reports of minimally invasive surgery, many (30–80%) patients received adjuvant radiation. However, functional outcomes were worse if radiation was added to surgery and even worse if both radiation and chemotherapy were used. Radiation dosage has largely followed that derived for all head and neck cancers, in this setting, based on risk. Historically, only one randomised clinical trial has addressed optimal dosage, allocated patients to two dosage levels, stratified by risk, but showed no difference in cancer control between the low and high doses (63 and 68.4 Gy), and a higher incidence of complications at the higher doses. Consequently, the lower dose of 57.6 Gy was recommended. Because the authors used a fractionation scheme of 1.8 Gy per treatment, this dosage was not widely adopted, practitioners preferring a larger fraction of 2 Gy to produce a shorter treatment time, and a slightly higher dose of 60 Gy in 2 Gy fractions (30 daily treatments). Yet 57.6 Gy in 1.8 Gy fractions is equivalent (iso-effective dose) to only 56 Gy in 2 Gy fractions. 60 Gy corresponds to the 63 Gy used as the low dose in the high-risk group. 60 Gy was also the dose used in RTOG 73–03. Subsequently, there was a tendency to intensify treatment in head and neck cancer, and many centres adopted a dose of 66 Gy, at least for those patients with adverse tumour features. The effectiveness of PORT in HPV+OPC receives some support from a cohort study (Level 2b), although the number of patients was low, and the number of events (recurrent disease or death), only 7%. Another retrospective population-level study (Level 4) of the SEER database (1998–2011) concluded that there was an overall survival but not disease-specific survival effect of radiation in 410 patients with a single lymph node involved, but used only univariate statistical analysis and contained no information on HPV status. A subsequent much larger study on a similar population in the National Cancer Database (2004–2013) of over 9,000 patients found a survival advantage but this was only in HPV-OPC, not in 410 HPV+OPC patients, and a subsequent study of 2,500 low and intermediate risk HPV+OPC patients showed similar overall survival whether PORT was given or not.

===== Deintensification =====
While fewer studies have been completed examining deintensification (de-escalation) in this setting than in primary radical radiation for this cancer (see below), it is an area of active investigation. In one single institution study, a decision was made to reduce the radiation dose in high-risk patients with HPV+OPC from 66 to 60 Gy, corresponding to the actual evidence, and follow-up has shown no decrease in cancer control. Current trials, both in North America and Europe (such as ECOG 3311 (Note: ECOG 3311 (NCT01706939) was activated in 2013 and completed accrual of 511 patients and is now in follow up – see Talk) and PATHOS (Note: Planned accrual of 242 patients to PATHOS commenced in late 2014 – see Talk)) use 50 Gy as the comparison arm. The comparator of 50 Gy was chosen on the grounds of (i) the exquisite sensitivity of HPV+OPC to radiation, both in vitro and in vivo; ECOG 1308 showing excellent disease control at 54 Gy; and data suggesting that 50 Gy in 1.43 Gy (iso-effective dose 43 Gy in 2.0 Gy) was sufficient to electively treat the neck. Other studies, such as MC1273 and DART-HPV have evaluated doses as low as 30–36 Gy. Lowering the radiation dose to 54 Gy was identified as one of the important Clinical Cancer Advances of 2018 by the American Society of Clinical Oncology, under the general theme of "Less Is More: Preserving Quality of Life With Less Treatment". Chemotherapy has been used concurrently with radiation in this setting, as in primary treatment with radical radiation, particularly where pathological features indicated a higher risk of cancer recurrence. Several studies have suggested that this does not improve local control but adds toxicity.

=== Radiotherapy ===
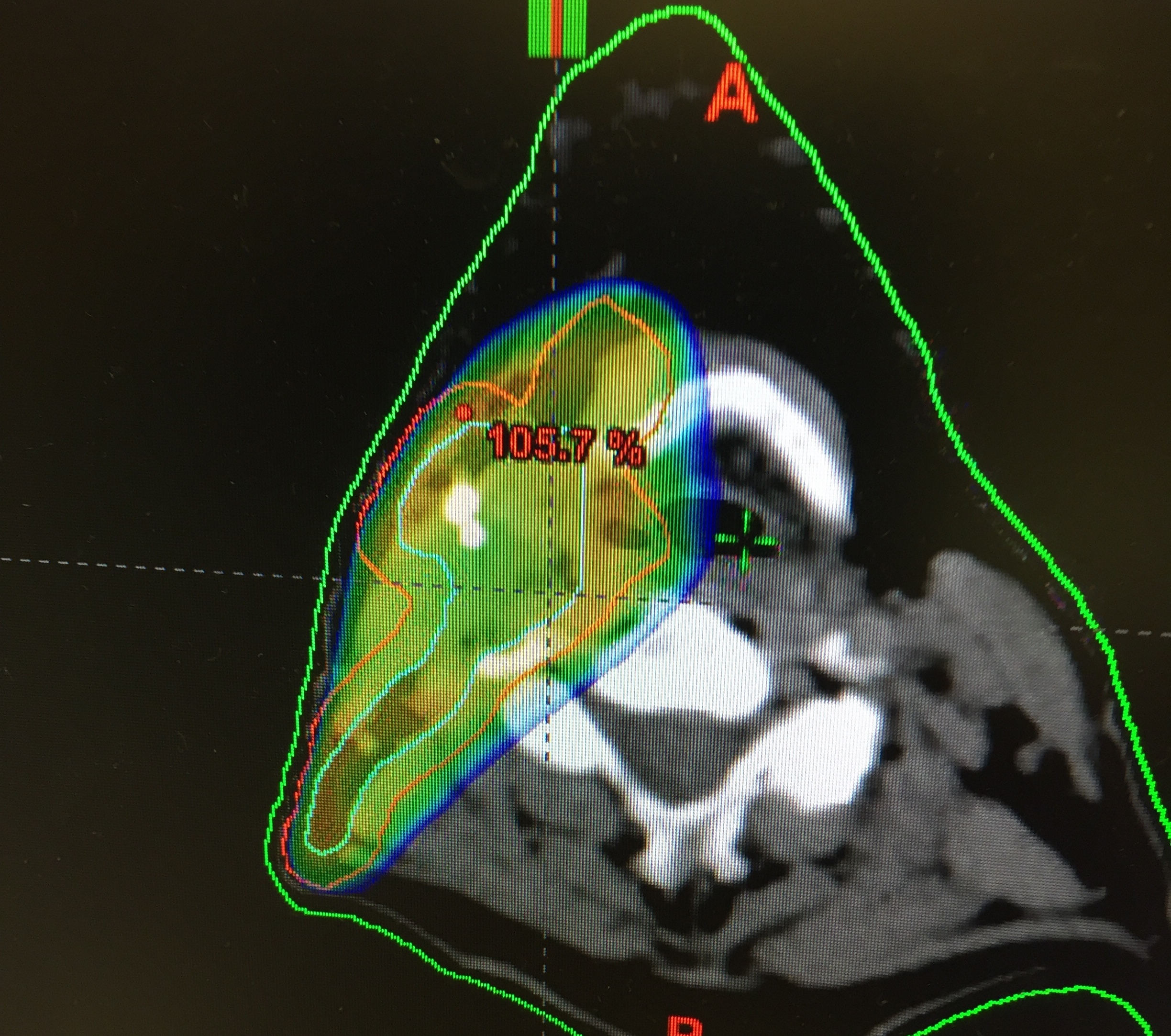
Transverse radiation contours used in treating cancer seen on above CT scan and in machine set up below

Person with HPV+OPC receiving IMRT PORT on Varian TruBeam linear accelerator with detail of restraining mask
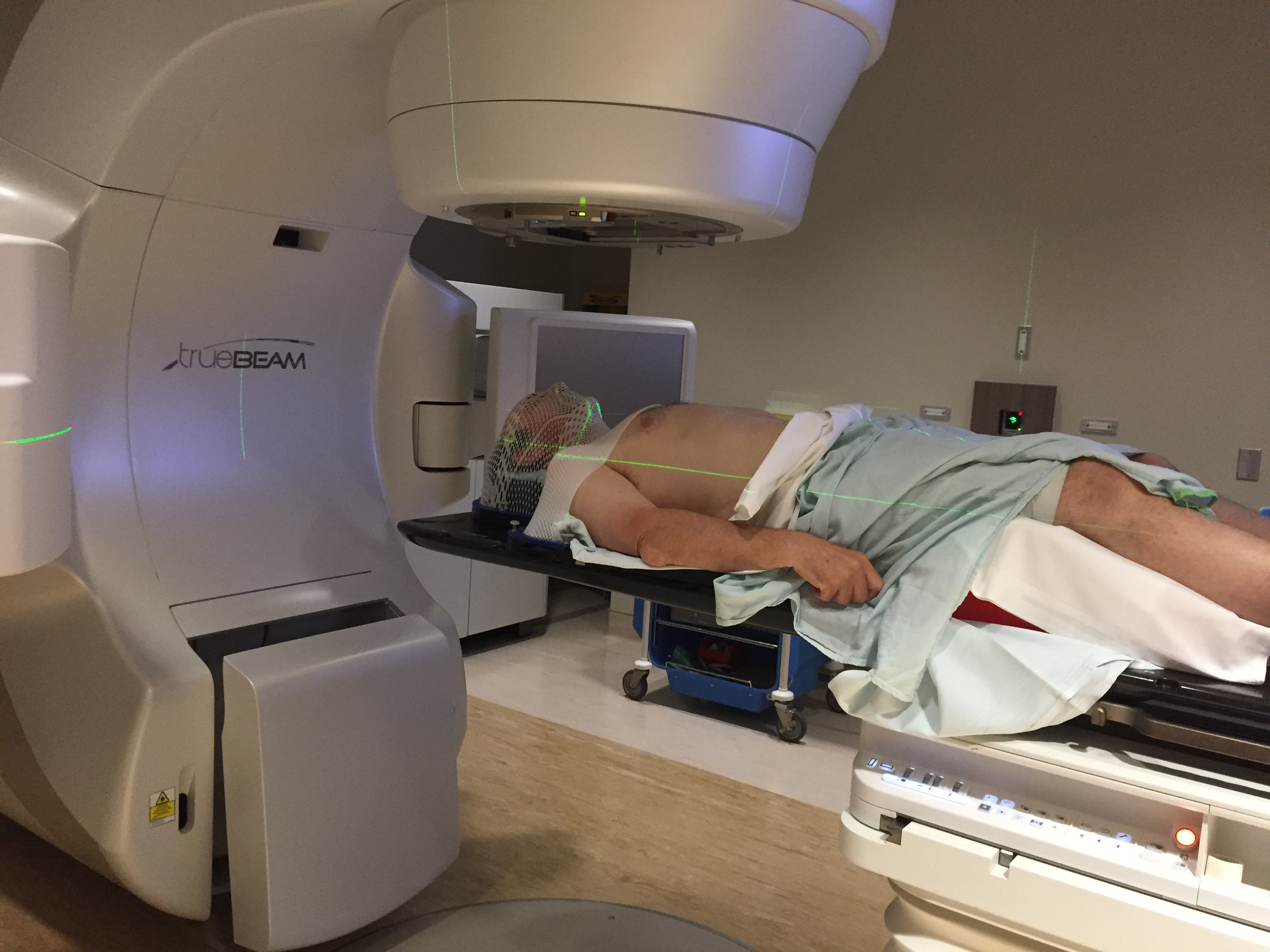
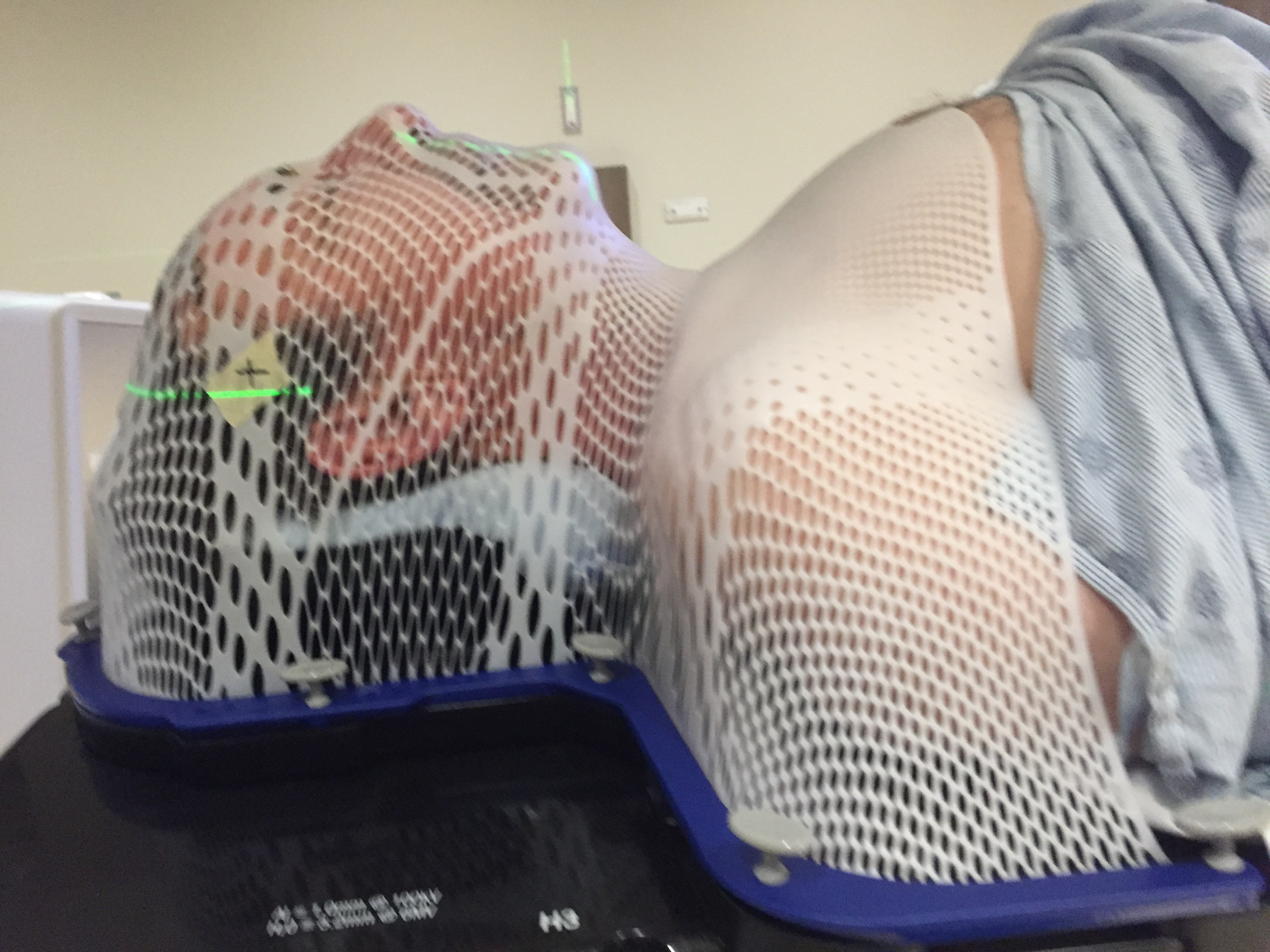

Concerns over the morbidity associated with traditional open surgical en-bloc resection led to exploring alternative approaches using radiation. Intensity-modulated radiation therapy (IMRT) can provide good control of primary tumours while preserving excellent control rates, with reduced toxicity to salivary and pharyngeal structures relative to earlier technology. HPV+OPC has shown increased sensitivity to radiation with more rapid regression, compared to HPV-OPC. Generally, radiation can safely be delivered to the involved side alone (ipsilateral), due to the low rate of recurrent cancer on the opposite side (contralateral), and significantly less toxicity compared to bilateral treatment. (Note: Contralteral recurrence after unilateral treatment has been reported in only 2.4% of cases) IMRT has a two-year disease-free survival between 82 and 90%, and a two-year disease-specific survival up to 97% for stage I and II.

Reported toxicities include dry mouth (xerostomia) from salivary gland damage, 18% (grade 2); (Note: Adverse effects are usually reported as grades 0–5, where 0 represents none and 5 represents death, corresponding to 1. mild, 2. moderate, 3. severe and 4. life-threatening. These are standardised as the Common Terminology Criteria for Adverse Events (CTCAE)) difficulty swallowing (dysphagia) from damage to the constrictor muscles, larynx and oesophageal sphincter, 15% (grade 2); subclinical aspiration up to 50% (reported incidence of aspiration pneumonia approximately 14%); hypothyroidism 28–38% at three years (may be up to 55% depending on amount of the thyroid gland exposed to over 45 Gy radiation; esophageal stenosis 5%; osteonecrosis of the mandible 2.5%; and need for a gastrostomy tube to be placed at some point during or up to one year after treatment 4% (up to 16% with longer follow up). Concerns have been expressed regarding excessive short- and long-term toxicity, especially dysphagia, and xerostomia, and hence whether standard doses expose patients with better prognoses are being exposed to overtreatment and unnecessary side effects.

==== Dosimetry ====
The probability of xerostomia at one year increases by 5% for every 1 Gy increase in dose to the parotid gland. Doses above 25–30 Gy are associated with moderate to severe xerostomia. Similar considerations apply to the submandibular gland. Xerostomia is less common if only one parotid gland is included in the radiated field and the contralateral submandibular gland is spared (less than 39 Gy) In the same manner, the radiation dose to the pharyngeal constrictor muscles, larynx, and cricopharyngeal inlet determine the risk of dysphagia (and hence the dependence on gastrostomy tube feeds). The threshold for this toxicity is volume-dependent at 55–60 Gy, with moderate to severe impairment of swallowing, including aspiration, stricture and feeding tube dependence above a mean dose of 47 Gy, with a recommended dose to the inferior constrictor of less than 41 Gy. Dose-toxicity relationships for the superior and middle constrictors are steep, with a 20% increase in the probability of dysphagia for each 10 Gy. For late dysphagia, threshold mean total constrictor doses, to limit rates of greater than or equal to grade 2 and 3 below 5% were 58 and 61 Gy respectively. For grade 2 dysphagia, the rate increased by 3.4% per Gy. Doses above 30 Gy to the thyroid are associated with moderate to severe hypothyroidism. Subjective, patient-reported outcomes of quality of life also correlate with radiation dose received.

Altered fractionation schemes, such as RTOG 9003 (Note: RTOG 9003 – see Talk) and RTOG 0129 (Note: RTOG0129 – see Talk) have not conferred additional benefit. Radiation dose recommendations were largely determined empirically in clinical studies with few HPV+OPC patients, and have remained unchanged for half a century, making it difficult to determine the optimum dose for this subgroup. A common approach uses 70 Gy bilaterally and anteriorly, such as RTOG 9003 (1991–1997) and RTOG 0129 (2002–2005). For lateralized tonsil cancer, unilateral neck radiation is usually prescribed, but for tongue base primaries, bilateral neck radiation is more common, but unilateral radiation may be used where tongue base lesions are lateralised.

==== Deintensification ====
Concerns have been expressed regarding excessive short- and long-term toxicity, especially dysphagia and xerostomia, and hence whether standard doses expose patients with better prognoses to overtreatment and unnecessary side effects. Current toxicities have been described as "not tolerable", and hence an intense interest in de-escalation.

While comparison with historical controls has limited value compared to randomised clinical trials (phase III), phase II studies using reduced doses of radiation compared to the historical standard of 70 Gy have been carried out. A study using 54–60 Gy (a 15–20% reduction, stratified by response to initial induction chemotherapy) demonstrated comparable levels of disease control with much lower complication rates, when compared to similar studies, using 70 Gy, such as ECOG 2399. The percentage of patients alive after 2 years was 95% at the higher dose and 98% at the lower dose. Similarly, for the percentage free of disease (86% and 92%). Toxicities were greatly reduced from an incidence of grade 3 or greater dysphagia and mucositis of 54% and 53%, respectively, to 9%. A lower incidence and severity of dysphagia also means that fewer patients require gastrostomy feeding. A similar comparison can be made with the pooled data from two RTOG studies, which utilized 70 Gy (0129 and 0522).

No new guidelines dealing specifically with HPV+OPC have yet been developed, outside of clinical trials. Indirect data suggests the efficacy of less intense treatment. A retrospective analysis of advanced (N+) HPV+OPC suggested 96% 5-year local control with de-intensified radiation of 54 Gy and concurrent cisplatin based chemotherapy. The conclusions of the above pair of similar phase II trials have been supported by several other phase II trials. A prospective trial (ECOG 1308) demonstrated similar locoregional control with 54 Gy, and another study, a high pathological complete response rate at 60 Gy. The Quarterback trial (Note: NCT01706939 – see Talk) showed comparable outcomes between 56 and 70 Gy. and was followed by Quarterback 2, comparing 50 to 56 Gy. (Note: NCT02945631 – see Talk) Similarly, the Optima trial showed good disease control with doses between 45 and 50 Gy. Ongoing studies, following the experience of the Mayo Clinic trial (MC1273), such as that the Memorial Sloan Kettering Cancer Center are exploring doses as low as 30Gy. (Note: NCT03323463 – see Talk) These studies all used well below the previous standard dose of 70 Gy. Since long-term toxicity is associated with radiation dose, determining the efficacy of lower and hence less morbid doses of radiation is a priority, since many HPV+ patients can be expected to have long-term survival. Recent commentary has highlighted investigational strategies that use tumor-intrinsic genomic measures of radiosensitivity, in particular the Genomic Adjusted Radiation Dose (GARD) framework to help identify patients with HPV-positive oropharyngeal cancer who may be suitable for radiation de-escalation.

Radiation is commonly utilised in combination with chemotherapy but also may be used as a single modality, especially in earlier stages, e.g. T1-T2, N0-1, and its use in later stages is being explored in clinical trials such as RTOG 1333 which compares radiation alone to radiation with reduced chemotherapy, in non or light smokers.

=== Chemotherapy ===
As with the radiotherapy data, most of the available knowledge on the efficacy of chemotherapy derives from the treatment of advanced head and neck cancer rather than specific studies of HPV+OPC. Since 1976, many clinical studies have compared CRT to RT alone in the primary management of locally advanced head and neck cancers and have demonstrated an advantage to CRT in both survival and locoregional control. Cisplatin is considered the standard agent, and a survival advantage was seen for those patients who received radiation with concurrent cisplatin. Despite this no trials directly comparing cisplatin with other agents in this context have been conducted. The other agent that is widely used is Cetuximab, a monoclonal antibody directed at the epidermal growth factor receptor (EGFR). A 10% survival advantage at three years was noted when cetuximab was given concurrently with radiation (bioradiation). Cetuximab trials were completed before knowledge of HPV status. Laboratory and clinical studies on the utility of cetuximab in this context are conflicting. The main toxicity is an acneiform rash. It had not been compared directly to cisplatin in HPV+OPC until RTOG 1016 (see Talk) addressed this question. Analysis of the results three years after the trial was completed demonstrates that cetuximab is inferior to cisplatin. Concurrent chemotherapy is also superior to chemotherapy alone (induction chemotherapy) followed by radiation. Cetuximab shows no advantage when added to cisplatin in combination with radiation. Although chemoradiation became a treatment standard based on clinical trials and in particular, meta-analyses, a subsequent population-based study of patients with OPC, indicated no advantage to the addition of chemotherapy to radiation in either HPV+OPC or HPV-OPC, and significant concerns about added toxicity.

Chemotherapy also has a role, combined with radiation, in the postoperative setting (adjuvant therapy). Generally, it is used where the pathology of the resected specimen indicates features associated with a high risk of locoregional recurrence (e.g., extracapsular extension through involved lymph nodes or very close margins). It has shown improved disease-free survival and locoregional control in two very similar clinical trials in such high-risk patients, EORTC 22931 (1994–2000) and RTOG 9501 (1995–2000). (Note: RTOG 9501 randomized 459 patients with head and neck cancer and any or all of the following high-risk features identified based on previous trials: histologic evidence of invasion of two or more regional lymph nodes, extracapsular extension of nodal disease, and microscopically involved mucosal resection margins, between radiation and chemoradiation with cisplatin postoperatively. At five years, locoregional control was improved with chemotherapy, but adverse events were greater. Distant metastases were not affected. A longer follow-up to ten years showed that these differences were only seen in two high-risk subgroups, those with positive margins and those with extracapsular extension) (Note: EORC 22931, also published in 2004, used a similar design but a differing definition of high risk. It showed a similar early advantage for combined therapy) (Note: RTOG 9501 – see Talk) However, for HPV+OPC patients, such extracapsular spread does not appear to be an adverse factor and the addition of chemotherapy to radiation in this group provided no further advantage. Since the sample size to detect a survival advantage is large, given the small number of events in this group, these studies may have been underpowered and the question of the utility of adding chemotherapy is being addressed in a randomized clinical trial (ADEPT) with two-year locoregional control and disease-free survival as the endpoint. (Note: ADEPT – see Talk) The addition of chemotherapy to radiation increases acute and late toxicity. In the GORTEC trial, chemotherapy with docetaxel provided improved survival and locoregional control in locally advanced OPC but was associated with increased mucositis and need for feeding by gastrostomy. Chemotherapy and radiation are associated with a risk of death of 3–4% in this context. It is unclear whether the added toxicity of adding chemotherapy to radiation is offset by significant clinical benefits in disease control and survival.

It is thought that HPV+OPC patients benefit better from radiotherapy and concurrent cetuximab treatment than HPV-OPC patients receiving the same treatment, and that radiation and cisplatin induce an immune response against an antigenic tumour which enhances their effect on the cancer cells. Although the incidence of HPV positivity is low (10–20%), an advantage for HPV+OPC was seen in trials of both cetuximab and panitumumab, a similar anti-EGFR agent, but not a consistent interaction with treatment, although HPV+OPC appears not to benefit to the same extent as HPV-OPC to second line anti-EGFR therapy, possibly due to lower EGFR expression in HPV+OPC.

=== Choice of treatment approach ===
In the absence of high-quality evidence comparing a primary surgical approach to other modalities, decisions are based on consideration of factors such as adequate surgical exposure and anatomically favourable features for adequate resection, post-treatment function, and quality of life. Such patient selection may enable them to avoid the morbidity of additional adjuvant treatment. In the absence of favourable surgical features, the primary treatment of choice remains radiation with or without chemotherapy. Tumor characteristics that favour a non-surgical approach include invasion of the base of the tongue to the extent of requiring resection of 50% or more of the tongue, pterygoid muscle involvement, extension into the parapharyngeal fat abutting the carotid, involvement of the mandible or maxilla or invasion of the prevertebral space.

The adequacy of surgical resection is a major factor in determining the role of postoperative adjuvant therapy. In the presence of a positive margin on pathological examination, most radiation oncologists recommend radiation to the primary site and concurrent chemotherapy. A negative margin is more likely to be treated with lower doses and a smaller treatment volume. Also, the removal of a bulky tumour may allow reduced dosage to adjacent uninvolved pharyngeal structures and hence less effect on normal swallowing.

The cancer outcomes (local control, regional control, and survival) for transoral resection followed by adjuvant therapy are comparable to primary chemoradiation, so that treatment decisions depend more on treatment-related morbidity, functional outcome, and quality of life. Patient factors also need to be taken into account, including general baseline functionality, smoking history, anesthesia risk, oropharyngeal function, swallowing and airway protection, and potential for rehabilitation. Patient preference is equally important. Many clinical trials are underway, focusing on deintensification, often with risk stratification, e.g., Low, Intermediate, and High Risk (see Fundakowski and Lango, Table I). (Note: For instance, ECOG 3311 stratifies HPV+OPC with AJCC 7 Stages III and IV 1–2, N1–2b into three risk groups postoperatively. Low risk is T1–T2 N0–N1 with negative margins. Intermediate risk is clear or close margins with the presence of adverse features on pathology, such as perineural invasion or lymphovascular invasion, <1 mm ECE or 2–4 nodes involved. High risk is positive margins or greater than 1 mm ECE or at least 5 nodes involved.)

Clinical decisions also take into account morbidities, particularly if cancer outcomes are comparable, for instance, surgery is associated with a risk of bleeding between 5–10%, and a 0.3% risk of fatal postoperative haemorrhage. Surgery may also be complicated by dysphagia, and while most patients can tolerate a diet on the first postoperative day, long-term use of a feeding tube has been reported as high as 10%. Patients with larger tumours, involvement of base of the tongue and requiring postoperative adjuvant therapy are more likely to require a long-term feeding tube. Overall, function and quality of life appear relatively similar between surgery with postoperative radiation and primary chemoradiation, but HPV+OPC patients tend to have a better quality of life at diagnosis than HPV-OPC but may sustain greater loss following treatment.

Anatomical considerations may also dictate a preference for surgical or non-surgical approaches. For instance, trismus, a bulky tongue, limited extension of the neck, prominent teeth, torus mandibularis (a bony growth on the mandible), or limited width of the mandible would all be relative contraindications to surgery. Tumour-related considerations include invasion of the mandible, base of the skull, and extensive involvement of the larynx or more than half of the base of the tongue. Technical considerations in offering surgery as a primary modality include the presumed ability to achieve adequate margins in the resected specimen and the degree of resulting defect, since close or positive margins are likely to result in subsequent adjuvant therapy to achieve disease control, with resultant increased morbidity. Costs are difficult to estimate but one US study, based on estimates of 25% of all OPC patients receiving surgery alone and 75% surgery followed by adjuvant therapy, using the criteria of the NCCN, found that this approach was less expensive than primary chemoradiation.

Early stage disease (Note: Early stage disease is considered as AJCC 7 as T1–22 N0–1 M0, approximately equivalent to T1–2 N0–2 M0 by AJCC 8) is associated with a relatively favourable outcome, for which single modality therapy is recommended, the choice depending on tumour location and accessibility. For instance, unilateral tonsil or tongue base tumours will generally be treated with transoral resection and selective ipsilateral neck dissection. On the other hand, a large midline tongue lesion would require bilateral neck dissection, but in the absence of what are considered adverse pathology (positive margins, extracapsular extension) will likely be treated by surgery alone or radiation including ipsilateral or bilateral neck radiation fields, with surgery for those instances where the likelihood of adjuvant therapy is low.

But many HPV+OPC present with involvement of the lymph nodes in the neck, and hence a higher stage of disease, generally referred to as locally advanced disease. This group is mostly treated with multimodality therapy, except one of the more favourable subgroups with small primary tumours and lymph node involvement confined to a single node no larger than 3 cm in size, which, as noted, are considered early-stage disease. The three main options for locally advanced but operable disease are resection, neck dissection, and adjuvant therapy; chemoradiation (with possible salvage surgery); induction chemotherapy followed by radiation or chemoradiation. However, the last option has not been supported in clinical trials that tested it. (Note: Clinical trials, such as PARADIGM and DeCIDE.) The primary consideration of surgery for locally advanced disease is to obtain adequate negative margins and spare the patient postoperative chemoradiation. But this must be balanced against the morbidity and functional loss from extensive resection, particularly where the tongue base is involved. To avoid such morbidity, primary chemoradiation is preferred. The management of disease within the cervical lymph nodes has to be taken into account in treating locally advanced disease. Guidelines for all OPC dictate that extracapsular extension be given postoperative chemoradiation. Where gross neck disease is evident initially, primary chemoradiation is usually given.

=== Patient preferences ===
Current guidelines are based on data for OPC as a whole, so that patients are generally being treated regardless of HPV status, yet many clinicians and researchers are considering deintensification. Treatment of this condition will likely continue to evolve in the direction of deintensification, to minimize loss of function but maintain disease control. In the absence of specific clinical trials and guidelines, patient preferences need to be taken into consideration to minimise short- and long-term toxicity and functional loss and optimize quality of life, given the prolonged survival frequently seen. This may involve exploring patients' values regarding trade-offs of disease control against adverse effects of treatment. Patients who have received CRT as primary treatment for OPC place a high value on survival, and although agreeing that deintensification is desirable, were reluctant to trade off much survival advantage for lower toxicity, though they would be more likely to forgo chemotherapy than accept reduced radiation.

=== Carcinoma of unknown primary ===
In some situations, HPV+OPC may present with cervical lymph nodes but no evident disease of a primary tumour (T0 N1–3) and is therefore classed as Squamous Cell Carcinoma of Unknown Primary Origin. This occurs in 2–4% of patients presenting with metastatic cancer in the cervical nodes. The incidence of HPV positivity is increasing at a similar rate to that seen in OPC. In such situations, resection of the lingual and palatine tonsils together with neck dissection may be diagnostic and constitute sufficient intervention, since recurrence rates are low.

== Prognosis ==
The presence of HPV within the tumour has been realised to be an important factor for predicting survival since the 1990s.

=== Comparison with HPV-negative oropharyngeal cancer ===
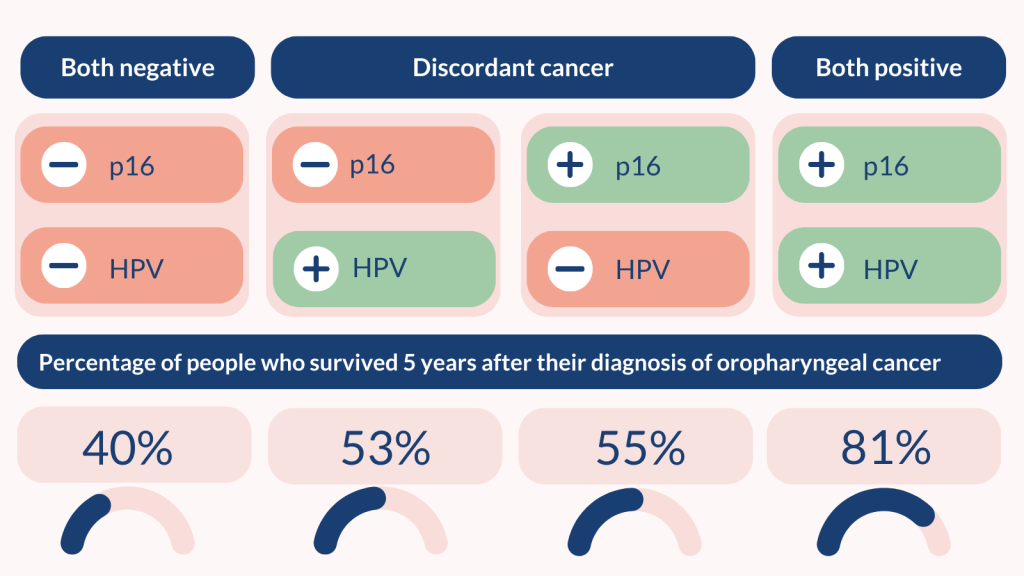
Types of oropharyngeal cancer and associated survival rates

Tumor HPV status is strongly associated with positive therapeutic response and survival compared with HPV-negative cancer, independent of the treatment modality chosen and even after adjustment for the stage. While HPV+OPC patients have some favourable demographic features compared to HPV-OPC patients, such differences account for only about ten percent of the survival difference seen between the two groups. Response rates of over 80% are reported in HPV+ cancer, and three-year progression-free survival has been reported as 75–82% and 45–57%, respectively, for HPV+ and HPV- cancer, and improving over time. It is likely that HPV+OPC is inherently less malignant than HPV-OPC since patients treated by surgery alone have better survival after adjustment for stage.

HPV is tested for by the presence of the biomarker p16, which normally increases in the presence of HPV. Some people can have elevated levels of p16 but test negative for HPV, and vice versa. This is known as discordant cancer. The 5-year survival for people who test positive for HPV and p16 is 81%, for discordant cancer it is 53 – 55%, and 40% for those who test negative for p16 and HPV.

=== Determinants of survival ===
In RTOG clinical trial 0129, (Note: RTOG 0129 - see Talk) in which all patients with advanced disease received radiation and chemotherapy, a retrospective analysis (recursive-partitioning analysis, or RPA) at three years identified three risk groups for survival (low, intermediate, and high) based on HPV status, smoking, T stage, and N stage (see Ang et al., Fig. 2). HPV status was the major determinant of survival, followed by smoking history and stage. 64% were HPV+ and all were in the low and intermediate-risk groups, with all non-smoking HPV+ patients in the low-risk group. 82% of the HPV+ patients were alive at three years compared to 57% of the HPV- patients, a 58% reduction in the risk of death. (Note: In RTOG 0129, the three prognostic groups were; Low risk: HPV-, and had either less than 10 pack years of smoking or more than 10 pack years but low nodal status (confined to a single node, >3 cm but ≤6 cm in greatest dimension); Intermediate risk: HPV+ with >10 pack year smoking and more advanced nodal status, or HPV-, <10 pack years and tumour stage T2–T3; High risk: All others (including the remainder of HPV-, <10 pack years with T4 tumours, and all with >10 pack years)) Locoregional failure is also lower in HPV+, being 14% compared to 35% for HPV-.

=== Determinants of disease progression ===
HPV positivity confers a 50–60% lower risk of disease progression and death, but the use of tobacco is an independently negative prognostic factor. A pooled analysis of HPV+OPC and HPV-OPC patients with disease progression in RTOG trials 0129 and 0522 showed that although less HPV+OPC experienced disease progression (23 v. 40%), the median time to disease progression following treatment was similar (8 months). The majority (65%) of recurrences in both groups occurred within the first year after treatment and were locoregional. Although the rate of failure in the opposite neck following treatment of only one side is 2.4%, the rate of an isolated recurrence in the opposite neck is 1.7%, and these were mainly where the primary tumour involved the midline. However, the rate of failure in the contralateral neck is also greater for HPV+. Of those that recur in this site, nearly all were successfully treated (salvaged) by further local treatment to the opposite neck.

=== Determinants of metastasis rates ===
HPV+ did not reduce the rate of metastases (about 45% of patients experiencing progression), which are predominantly to the lungs (70%), although some studies have reported a lower rate. with 3-year distant recurrence rates of about 10% for patients treated with primary radiation or chemoradiation. Even if recurrence or metastases occur, HPV positivity still confers an advantage. By contrast, tobacco usage is an independently negative prognostic factor, with decreased response to therapy, increased disease recurrence rates, and decreased survival. The negative effects of smoking increase with the amount smoked, particularly if greater than 10 pack-years.

=== Predictors of survival ===
==== After chemoradiation ====
For patients such as those treated on RTOG 0129 with primary chemoradiation, detailed nomograms have been derived from that dataset combined with RTOG 0522, enabling prediction of outcome based on a large number of variables. For instance, a 71-year-old married non-smoking high school graduate with a performance status (PS) of 0, and no weight loss or anaemia and a T3N1 HPV+OPC would expect to have a progression-free survival of 92% at 2 years and 88% at 5 years. A 60-year-old unmarried nonsmoking high school graduate with a PS of 1, weight loss and anaemia, and a T4N2 HPV+OPC would expect to have a survival of 70% at two years and 48% at five years.

==== After surgery ====
Less detailed information is available for those treated primarily with surgery, for whom fewer patients are available, as well as low rates of recurrence (7–10%). The features that have traditionally been useful in predicting prognosis in other head and neck cancers appear to be less useful in HPV+OPC. These patients are frequently stratified into three risk groups:

- Low risk: No adverse pathological features
- Intermediate risk: T3–T4 primary, perineural or lymphovascular invasion, N2 (AJCC 7)
- High risk: Positive margins, ECE

=== Development of other cancers ===
HPV+OPC patients are less likely to develop other cancers, compared to other head and neck cancer patients. A possible explanation for the favourable impact of HPV+ is "the lower probability of occurrence of 11q13 gene amplification, which is considered to be a factor underlying faster and more frequent recurrence of the disease" Presence of TP53 mutations, a marker for HPV- OPC, is associated with worse prognosis. High grade of p16 staining is thought to be better than HPV PCR analysis in predicting radiotherapy response.

=== Regional recurrence after surgery ===
The risk of regional cancer recurrence after neck dissection is often estimated from a large series based on all upper aerodigestive squamous cell cancers. In this series, the overall risks at three years by pathological stage (AJCC 7) were:

- pN0 4.7%
- pN1 4.9%
- pN2 12.1%

== Epidemiology ==
In 2015, squamous cell cancer of the head and neck region was the fifth most common cancer other than skin cancer, globally, with an annual incidence of 600,000 cases and about 60,000 cases annually in the United States and Europe. The global incidence of pharyngeal cancer in 2013 was estimated at 136,000 cases. For 2008 the Global Burden of Disease for OPC in 2008 is estimated at 85,000 cases, of which 22,000 were attributable to HPV, a population attributable fraction (PAF) of 26%. Of these, 17,000 were males and 4,400 females, 13,000 (60%) were aged between 50 and 69 years, and the majority of cases (15,000) were in developed regions compared to developing regions (6,400). Age Standardised Incidence Rates (ASR) differ considerably by region and country (see de Martel et al., 2017 Fig. 2b). ASRs for 2012 were highest in Europe (Hungary 3.0) and North America (United States 1.7) but much lower in Africa (≤ 0.3), Asia (≤ 0.6), Latin America (≤ 0.4) and Oceania (≤ 0.2) (other than Australasia, Australia 0.9). Estimated average numbers of cases and ASR for the US in the period 2008–2012 were 15,738 and 4.5, respectively. HPV+OPC was much more common in males than females (12,638, 7.6 and 3,100, 1.7). The highest incidence age group was 60–69 and was higher in Caucasians than in other races.

HPV+OPC patients tend to be younger than HPV- patients in general. The clinical presentation is also changing from the "typical" head and neck cancer patient with advanced age and major substance usage. By contrast, patients with HPV+ cancer are younger (4th–6th decades), male (ratio 8:1) with no or only a minimum history of smoking, generally Caucasian, reached higher education levels, are married, and have higher income. The risk factors for HPV-OPC and HPV+OPC tend to be independent, except for smoking which adversely affects both. The presenting features are also different between HPV+ and HPV- OPC. HPV+ tumours have smaller primary lesions (less than 4 cm) but more advanced nodal disease, resulting in higher TNM staging. This, in turn, may overestimate the severity of the disease status.

=== Trends ===
There has been a global trend in increasing OPC incidence, particularly in North America and northern Europe, but even in Taiwan, which has a very high rate for all cancers of the head and neck region, OPC rates increased more rapidly between 1995 and 2009 than any other cancer site. The Global Burden of HPV+OPC increased from 22,000 in 2008 to 29,000 by 2012, and the PAF from 26% to 31%, and is considered an epidemic. In the United States the estimated number of cases was 12,410 in 2008, 13,930 in 2013 and 17,000 for 2017. Of these cases, HPV+ cancer has been increasing compared to HPV- cancer, but the increase in HPV+OPC exceeds the decline in HPV-OPC resulting an overall increase in OPC. The rise in pharyngeal cancer incidence contrasts with a marginal decline in other head and neck cancers. As a result, the commonest head and neck cancer has shifted from larynx to oropharynx. A survey of 23 countries between 1983 and 2002 showed an increase in oropharyngeal squamous cell carcinoma that was particularly noticeable in young men in economically developed countries. In the United Kingdom the incidence of oral and oropharyngeal cancer in men rose 51%, from 7/100,000 to 11/100,000 between 1989 and 2006. In the US there is a growing incidence of HPV associated oropharyngeal cancers, In the early 1980s HPV+ accounted for only 7.5% of cases in the US but by 2016 this was 70%, perhaps as a result of changing sexual behaviors, decreased popularity of tonsillectomies, improved radiologic and pathologic evaluation, and changes in classification. Tonsil and oropharyngeal cancers increased in male predominance between 1975 and 2004, despite reductions in smoking. HPV-OPC decreased with decreasing smoking rates from 1988 to 2004, while HPV+OPC increased by almost 7.5% per year from about 16% of all cases of OPC in the early 1980s to almost 70% in 2004. The decline in smoking may be linked to the decreasing proportion of HPV negative cancers, while changes in sexual activity may be reflected in increasing proportion of HPV positive cancers. Recently, in the US, HPV associated OPC represent about 60% of OPC cases compared with 40% in the previous decade. By 2007, in the US, incidence of general OPC, including non-HPV associated, is 3.2 cases per 100,000 males/year and 1.9 per 100,000 all-sexes/year. This makes HPV+OPC one of only five cancers that have increased in incidence in the US since 1975. The largest increase in incidence has occurred in patients under age 50.

The increase in incidence of HPV-associated OPC is also seen in other countries, like Sweden, with a 2007 incidence of over 80% for cancer in the tonsils, Finland and the Czech Republic. Partners of patients with HPV-positive oropharyngeal cancer do not seem to have elevated oral HPV infection compared with the general population. In Australia, the incidence of HPV-associated OPC was 1.56 cases per 100,000 males/year (2001–2005), rising from 19% (1987–90) to 47% (2001–05) and 63.5% (2006–2010). In Canada, the percentage of cases of OPC attributable to HPV increased from 47% in 2000 to 74% in 2012.

== See also ==
- HPV-associated oropharyngeal cancer awareness and prevention

== Bibliography ==
- "Common Terminology Criteria for Adverse Events (CTCAE) Version 4.0 Published: May 28, 2009 (v4.03)" (PDF). CTCAE. National Cancer Institute. 14 June 2010. Archived from the original (PDF) on 30 August 2017.

=== Articles ===
- Fakhry, Carole; Gillison, Maura L. (10 June 2006). "Clinical Implications of Human Papillomavirus in Head and Neck Cancers". Journal of Clinical Oncology (Review). 24 (17): 2606–2611. doi:10.1200/JCO.2006.06.1291. PMC 4696042. PMID 16763272.
- Lindberg, Robert (June 1972). "Distribution of cervical lymph node metastases from squamous cell carcinoma of the upper respiratory and digestive tracts". Cancer. 29 (6): 1446–1449. doi:10.1002/1097-0142(197206)29:6<1446::AID-CNCR2820290604>3.0.CO;2-C. PMID 5031238. S2CID 11167436.
- Mehanna, H.; Jones, T. M.; Gregoire, V.; Ang, K. K. (24 April 2010). "Oropharyngeal carcinoma related to human papillomavirus". BMJ (Editorial). 340 (7752): 879–880. doi:10.1136/bmj.c1439. JSTOR 40701677. PMID 20339160. S2CID 27997605.
- Nguyen, N. P.; Chi, A.; Nguyen, L. M.; Ly, B. H.; Karlsson, U.; Vinh-Hung, V. (2009). "Human papillomavirus-associated oropharyngeal cancer: a new clinical entity". QJM (Review). 103 (4): 229–236. doi:10.1093/qjmed/hcp176. PMID 20015950.
- Psyrri, A.; Gouveris, P.; Vermorken, J. B. (2009). "Human papillomavirus-related head and neck tumors: clinical and research implication". Current Opinion in Oncology (Review). 21 (3): 201–205. doi:10.1097/CCO.0b013e328329ab64. PMID 19370803. S2CID 35188456.
- Ramqvist, Torbjörn; Dalianis, Tina (November 2010). "Oropharyngeal Cancer Epidemic and Human Papillomavirus". Emerging Infectious Diseases (Review). 16 (11): 1671–1677. doi:10.3201/eid1611.100452. PMC 3294514. PMID 21029523.
- Westra, W. H. (2009). "The Changing Face of Head and Neck Cancer in the 21st Century: the Impact of HPV on the Epidemiology and Pathology of Oral Cancer". Head and Neck Pathology (Review). 3 (1) 78: 78–81. doi:10.1007/s12105-009-0100-y. PMC 2807531. PMID 20596995.

==== Human Papilloma Virus (HPV) and molecular biology ====
- Adelstein, D. J.; Rodriguez, Cristina P. (February 3, 2010). "Human Papillomavirus: Changing Paradigms in Oropharyngeal Cancer". Current Oncology Reports. 12 (2): 115–120. doi:10.1007/s11912-010-0084-5. PMID 20425596. S2CID 11091993.
- Agoston, E. .; Robinson, S. .; Mehra, K. .; et al. (2010). "Polymerase chain reaction detection of HPV in squamous carcinoma of the oropharynx". American Journal of Clinical Pathology. 134 (1): 36–41. doi:10.1309/AJCP1AAWXE5JJCLZ. PMID 20551264.
- Ault, KA (2006). "Epidemiology and Natural History of Human Papillomavirus Infections in the Female Genital tract". Infectious Diseases in Obstetrics and Gynecology. 2006 040470: 1–5. doi:10.1155/IDOG/2006/40470. PMC 1581465. PMID 16967912.
- Chung, C. H.; Gillison, M. L. (27 October 2009). "Human Papillomavirus in Head and Neck Cancer: Its Role in Pathogenesis and Clinical Implications". Clinical Cancer Research. 15 (22): 6758–6762. doi:10.1158/1078-0432.CCR-09-0784. PMID 19861444.
- Cristina Mazon, Renata; Rovigatti Gerbelli, Thaís; Benatti Neto, Carlos; et al. (February 2011). "Abnormal cell-cycle expression of the proteins p27, mdm2 and cathepsin B in oral squamous-cell carcinoma infected with human papillomavirus". Acta Histochemica. 113 (2): 109–116. doi:10.1016/j.acthis.2009.08.008. PMID 19811804.
- D'Souza, Gypsyamber; Gross, Neil D.; Pai, Sara I.; Haddad, Robert; Anderson, Karen S.; Rajan, Shirani; Gerber, Jennifer; Gillison, Maura L.; Posner, Marshall R. (10 August 2014). "Oral Human Papillomavirus (HPV) Infection in HPV-Positive Patients With Oropharyngeal Cancer and Their Partners". Journal of Clinical Oncology. 32 (23): 2408–2415. doi:10.1200/JCO.2014.55.1341. PMC 4263818. PMID 24778397.
- Elmofty, S.; Patil, S. (2006). "Human papillomavirus (HPV)-related oropharyngeal nonkeratinizing squamous cell carcinoma: Characterization of a distinct phenotype". Oral Surgery, Oral Medicine, Oral Pathology, Oral Radiology, and Endodontology. 101 (3): 339–345. doi:10.1016/j.tripleo.2005.08.001. PMID 16504868.
- Frisch, M.; Biggar, R. (1999). "Aetiological parallel between tonsillar and anogenital squamous-cell carcinomas". The Lancet (Submitted manuscript). 354 (9188): 1442–1443. doi:10.1016/S0140-6736(99)92824-6. PMID 10543674. S2CID 33391604.
- Gillison, M. L.; Koch, W. M.; Capone, R. B.; et al. (May 2000). "Evidence for a causal association between human papillomavirus and a subset of head and neck cancers". Journal of the National Cancer Institute. 92 (9): 709–720. doi:10.1093/jnci/92.9.709. ISSN 0027-8874. PMID 10793107.
- Guan, X.; Sturgis, E.; Lei, D.; Liu, Z.; Dahlstrom, K.; Wei, Q.; Li, G. (2010). "Association of TGF-beta1 genetic variants with HPV16-positive oropharyngeal cancer". Clinical Cancer Research. 16 (5): 1416–1422. doi:10.1158/1078-0432.CCR-09-2877. PMC 2831118. PMID 20179236.
- Ha, Patrick K; Califano, Joseph A (January 2006). "Promoter methylation and inactivation of tumour-suppressor genes in oral squamous-cell carcinoma". The Lancet Oncology. 7 (1): 77–82. doi:10.1016/S1470-2045(05)70540-4. PMID 16389187.
- Haeggblom, Linnea; Ramqvist, Torbjörn; Tommasino, Massimo; Dalianis, Tina; Näsman, Anders (December 2017). "Time to change perspectives on HPV in oropharyngeal cancer. A systematic review of HPV prevalence per oropharyngeal sub-site the last 3 years". Papillomavirus Research. 4: 1–11. doi:10.1016/j.pvr.2017.05.002. PMC 5883233. PMID 29179862.
- Hong, Angela; Zhang, Xiaoying; Jones, Deanna; Veillard, Anne-Sophie; Zhang, Mei; Martin, Andrew; Lyons, J. Guy; Lee, C. Soon; Rose, Barbara (February 2016a). "Relationships between p53 mutation, HPV status and outcome in oropharyngeal squamous cell carcinoma". Radiotherapy and Oncology. 118 (2): 342–349. doi:10.1016/j.radonc.2016.02.009. PMID 26952933.
- Howard, Jason D.; Chung, Christine H. (July 2012). "Biology of Human Papillomavirus–Related Oropharyngeal Cancer". Seminars in Radiation Oncology. 22 (3): 187–193. doi:10.1016/j.semradonc.2012.03.002. PMC 3715056. PMID 22687942.
- Jung, A.; Briolat, J.; Millon, R.; De Reyniès, A.; Rickman, D.; Thomas, E.; Abecassis, J.; Clavel, C.; Wasylyk, B. (2009). "Biological and clinical relevance of transcriptionnally active human papillomavirus (HPV) infection in oropharynx squamous cell carcinoma". International Journal of Cancer. 126 (8): 1882–1894. doi:10.1002/ijc.24911. PMID 19795456. S2CID 3441257.
- Klussmann, J.; Mooren, J.; Lehnen, M.; et al. (Mar 2009). "Genetic signatures of HPV-related and unrelated oropharyngeal carcinoma and their prognostic implications". Clinical Cancer Research. 15 (5): 1779–1786. doi:10.1158/1078-0432.CCR-08-1463. ISSN 1078-0432. PMID 19223504.
- Kreimer, Aimée R.; Bhatia, Rohini K.; Messeguer, Andrea L.; González, Paula; Herrero, Rolando; Giuliano, Anna R. (January 2010). "Oral Human Papillomavirus in Healthy Individuals: A Systematic Review of the Literature". Sexually Transmitted Diseases. 37 (6): 386–91. doi:10.1097/OLQ.0b013e3181c94a3b. PMID 20081557. S2CID 32378293.
- Lajer, C. B.; Buchwald, C. V. (2010). "The role of human papillomavirus in head and neck cancer". APMIS. 118 (6–7): 510–519. doi:10.1111/j.1600-0463.2010.02624.x. PMID 20553531. S2CID 7199240.
- Lassen, P. (2010). "The role of Human papillomavirus in head and neck cancer and the impact on radiotherapy outcome". Radiotherapy and Oncology. 95 (3): 371–380. doi:10.1016/j.radonc.2010.04.022. PMID 20493569.
- Lawrence MS, Sougnez C, Lichtenstein L, et al. (28 January 2015). "Comprehensive genomic characterization of head and neck squamous cell carcinomas". Nature. 517 (7536): 576–582. Bibcode:2015Natur.517..576T. doi:10.1038/nature14129. PMC 4311405. PMID 25631445.
- Lohavanichbutr, P.; Houck, J.; Fan, W.; et al. (Feb 2009). "Genome-wide gene expression profiles of HPV-positive and HPV-negative oropharyngeal cancer: potential implications for treatment choices". Archives of Otolaryngology–Head & Neck Surgery. 135 (2): 180–188. doi:10.1001/archoto.2008.540. ISSN 0886-4470. PMC 2761829. PMID 19221247.
- Mannarini, L.; Kratochvil, V.; Calabrese, L.; Gomes Silva, L.; Morbini, P.; Betka, J.; Benazzo, M. (2009). "Human Papilloma Virus (HPV) in head and neck region: review of literature". Acta Otorhinolaryngologica Italica. 29 (3): 119–126. PMC 2815356. PMID 20140157.
- Martinez, I.; Wang, J.; Hobson, K.; Ferris, R.; Khan, S. (Jan 2007). "Identification of differentially expressed genes in HPV-positive and HPV-negative oropharyngeal squamous cell carcinomas". European Journal of Cancer. 43 (2): 415–432. doi:10.1016/j.ejca.2006.09.001. ISSN 0959-8049. PMC 1847595. PMID 17079134.
- Maslon, Magda M.; Hupp, Ted R. (September 2010). "Drug discovery and mutant p53". Trends in Cell Biology. 20 (9): 542–555. doi:10.1016/j.tcb.2010.06.005. PMID 20656489.
- Michl, P; Pazdera, J; Prochazka, M; Pink, R; Stosova, T (2010). "Human papillomavirus in the etiology of head and neck carcinomas" (PDF). Biomedical Papers of the Medical Faculty of the University Palacky, Olomouc, Czechoslovakia. 154 (1): 9–12. doi:10.5507/bp.2010.004. PMID 20445705.
- Robinson, M.; Sloan, P.; Shaw, R. (2010). "Refining the diagnosis of oropharyngeal squamous cell carcinoma using human papillomavirus testing". Oral Oncology. 46 (7): 492–496. doi:10.1016/j.oraloncology.2010.02.013. PMID 20227331.
- Schlecht, N.; Burk, R.; Adrien, L.; et al. (Nov 2007). "Gene expression profiles in HPV-infected head and neck cancer". The Journal of Pathology. 213 (3): 283–293. doi:10.1002/path.2227. ISSN 0022-3417. PMID 17893858. S2CID 11205618.
- Seiwert, Tanguy Y. (10 December 2014). "Ties That Bind: p16 As a Prognostic Biomarker and the Need for High-Accuracy Human Papillomavirus Testing". Journal of Clinical Oncology. 32 (35): 3914–3916. doi:10.1200/JCO.2014.57.9268. PMID 25366683.
- Smeets, S.; Van Der Plas, M.; Schaaij-Visser, T.; Van Veen, E.; Van Meerloo, J.; Braakhuis, B.; Steenbergen, R.; Brakenhoff, R. (2010). "Immortalization of oral keratinocytes by functional inactivation of the p53 and pRb pathways". International Journal of Cancer. 128 (7): 1596–605. doi:10.1002/ijc.25474. PMID 20499310. S2CID 21846809.
- Syrjänen, S. (2004). "HPV infections and tonsillar carcinoma". Journal of Clinical Pathology. 57 (5): 449–455. doi:10.1136/jcp.2003.008656. PMC 1770289. PMID 15113849.
- Syrjänen, Kari; Syrjänen, Stina; Lamberg, Matti; Pyrhönen, Seppo; Nuutinen, Juhant (December 1983). "Morphological and immunohistochemical evidence suggesting human papillomavirus (HPV) involvement in oral squamous cell carcinogenesis". International Journal of Oral Surgery. 12 (6): 418–424. doi:10.1016/S0300-9785(83)80033-7. PMID 6325356.
- Underbrink, M.; Hoskins, S.; Pou, A.; Albrecht, T. (2008). "Viral interaction: a possible contributing factor in head and neck cancer progression". Acta Oto-Laryngologica. 128 (12): 1361–1369. doi:10.1080/00016480801965001. PMID 18607925. S2CID 205395382.
- Vidal, L.; Gillison, M. (2008). "Human papillomavirus in HNSCC: recognition of a distinct disease type". Hematology Oncology Clinics of North America. 22 (6): 1125–1142, vii. doi:10.1016/j.hoc.2008.08.006. PMID 19010263.
- Vokes, EE; Agrawal, N; Seiwert, TY (December 2015). "HPV-Associated Head and Neck Cancer". Journal of the National Cancer Institute. 107 (12) djv344. doi:10.1093/jnci/djv344. PMID 26656751.
- Weinberger, P.; Yu, Z.; Kountourakis, P.; Sasaki, C.; Haffty, B.; Kowalski, D.; Merkley, M.; Rimm, D.; Camp, R.; Psyrri, A. (Sep 2009). "Defining molecular phenotypes of human papillomavirus-associated oropharyngeal squamous cell carcinoma: Validation of three-class hypothesis". Otolaryngology–Head and Neck Surgery. 141 (3): 382–389.e1. doi:10.1016/j.otohns.2009.04.014. ISSN 0194-5998. PMID 19716018. S2CID 207300943.
- Yamakawa-Kakuta, Y; Kawamata, H; Doi, Y; Fujimori, T; Imai, Y (15 September 2009). "Does the expression of HPV16/18 E6/E7 in head and neck squamous cell carcinomas relate to their clinicopathological characteristics?". International Journal of Oncology. 35 (5): 983–988. doi:10.3892/ijo_00000412. PMID 19787251.
- zur Hausen, Harald (1 May 2002). "Papillomaviruses and cancer: from basic studies to clinical application". Nature Reviews Cancer. 2 (5): 342–350. Bibcode:2002NatRC...2..342Z. doi:10.1038/nrc798. PMID 12044010. S2CID 4991177.

==== Diagnosis and staging ====
- Chenevert, J; Seethala, RR; Barnes, EL; Chiosea, SI (April 2012). "Squamous cell carcinoma metastatic to neck from an unknown primary: the potential impact of modern pathologic evaluation on perceived incidence of human papillomavirus-positive oropharyngeal carcinoma prior to 1970". The Laryngoscope. 122 (4): 793–796. doi:10.1002/lary.21899. PMID 22252715. S2CID 25749527.
- Goldenberg, David; Begum, Shahnaz; Westra, William H.; Khan, Zubair; Sciubba, James; Pai, Sara I.; Califano, Joseph A.; Tufano, Ralph P.; Koch, Wayne M. (July 2008). "Cystic lymph node metastasis in patients with head and neck cancer: An HPV-associated phenomenon" (PDF). Head & Neck. 30 (7): 898–903. doi:10.1002/hed.20796. PMID 18383529. S2CID 32614424. Archived from the original (PDF) on 2010-11-26.
- Huang, Shao Hui; Xu, Wei; Waldron, John; et al. (10 March 2015). "Refining American Joint Committee on Cancer/Union for International Cancer Control TNM Stage and Prognostic Groups for Human Papillomavirus–Related Oropharyngeal Carcinomas". Journal of Clinical Oncology. 33 (8): 836–845. doi:10.1200/JCO.2014.58.6412. PMID 25667292.
- Keane, Florence K.; Chen, Yui-Hui; Neville, Bridget A.; Tishler, Roy B.; Schoenfeld, Jonathan D.; Catalano, Paul J.; Margalit, Danielle N. (1 August 2015). "Changing prognostic significance of tumor stage and nodal stage in patients with squamous cell carcinoma of the oropharynx in the human papillomavirus era". Cancer. 121 (15): 2594–2602. doi:10.1002/cncr.29402. PMID 25873094. S2CID 205670627.
- Lydiatt, William M.; Patel, Snehal G.; O'Sullivan, Brian; Brandwein, Margaret S.; Ridge, John A.; Migliacci, Jocelyn C.; Loomis, Ashley M.; Shah, Jatin P. (March 2017). "Head and Neck cancers-major changes in the American Joint Committee on cancer eighth edition cancer staging manual". CA: A Cancer Journal for Clinicians. 67 (2): 122–137. doi:10.3322/caac.21389. PMID 28128848.
- O'Sullivan, Brian; Huang, Shao Hui; Su, Jie; et al. (April 2016). "Development and validation of a staging system for HPV-related oropharyngeal cancer by the International Collaboration on Oropharyngeal cancer Network for Staging (ICON-S): a multicentre cohort study". The Lancet Oncology. 17 (4): 440–451. doi:10.1016/S1470-2045(15)00560-4. PMID 26936027.
- Porceddu, Sandro V (April 2016). "A TNM classification for HPV+ oropharyngeal cancer". The Lancet Oncology (Editorial). 17 (4): 403–404. doi:10.1016/S1470-2045(15)00611-7. PMID 26936026.

==== Treatment ====
- Brockstein, Bruce E.; Vokes, Everett E. (February 2011). "Head and neck cancer in 2010: Maximizing survival and minimizing toxicity". Nature Reviews Clinical Oncology. 8 (2): 72–74. doi:10.1038/nrclinonc.2010.226. PMID 21278773. S2CID 1347226.
- Corry, June; Peters, Lester J.; Rischin, Danny (10 January 2015). "Impact of Center Size and Experience on Outcomes in Head and Neck Cancer". Journal of Clinical Oncology. 33 (2): 138–140. doi:10.1200/JCO.2014.58.2239. PMID 25488964.
- Fakhry, C.; Westra, W.; Li, S.; Cmelak, A.; Ridge, J.; Pinto, H.; Forastiere, A.; Gillison, M. (Feb 2008). "Improved survival of patients with human papillomavirus-positive head and neck squamous cell carcinoma in a prospective clinical trial". Journal of the National Cancer Institute. 100 (4): 261–269. doi:10.1093/jnci/djn011. ISSN 0027-8874. PMID 18270337.
- Fakhry, Carole; Zhang, Qiang; Nguyen-Tan, Phuc Felix; et al. (20 October 2014). "Human Papillomavirus and Overall Survival After Progression of Oropharyngeal Squamous Cell Carcinoma". Journal of Clinical Oncology. 32 (30): 3365–3373. doi:10.1200/JCO.2014.55.1937. PMC 4195851. PMID 24958820.
- Fundakowski, Christopher E.; Lango, Miriam (11 July 2016). "Considerations in surgical versus non-surgical management of HPV positive oropharyngeal cancer". Cancers of the Head & Neck (Review). 1 (1): 6. doi:10.1186/s41199-016-0007-8. PMC 6457136. PMID 31093336.
- Galloway, TJ; Ridge, JA (10 October 2015). "Management of Squamous Cancer Metastatic to Cervical Nodes With an Unknown Primary Site". Journal of Clinical Oncology (Review). 33 (29): 3328–3337. CiteSeerX 10.1.1.1029.7347. doi:10.1200/JCO.2015.61.0063. PMID 26351351.
- Maxwell, Jessica H.; Mehta, Vikas; Wang, Hong; Cunningham, Diana; Duvvuri, Umamaheswar; Kim, Seungwon; Johnson, Jonas; Ferris, Robert L. (July 2014). "Quality of life in head and neck cancer patients: Impact of HPV and primary treatment modality". The Laryngoscope. 124 (7): 1592–1597. doi:10.1002/lary.24508. PMID 24353066. S2CID 8040452.
- Mehanna, H; Evans, M; Beasley, M; Chatterjee, S; Dilkes, M; Homer, J; O'Hara, J; Robinson, M; Shaw, R; Sloan, P (12 May 2016). "Oropharyngeal cancer: United Kingdom National Multidisciplinary Guidelines". The Journal of Laryngology & Otology. 130 (S2): S90–S96. doi:10.1017/S0022215116000505. PMC 4873902. PMID 27841123.
- More, Yogesh I.; Tsue, Terance T.; Girod, Douglas A.; Harbison, John; Sykes, Kevin J.; Williams, Carson; Shnayder, Yelizaveta (1 January 2013). "Functional Swallowing Outcomes Following Transoral Robotic Surgery vs Primary Chemoradiotherapy in Patients With Advanced-Stage Oropharynx and Supraglottis Cancers". JAMA Otolaryngology–Head & Neck Surgery. 139 (1): 43–48. doi:10.1001/jamaoto.2013.1074. PMID 23247974.
- Sharma, Arun; Méndez, Eduardo; Yueh, Bevan; Lohavanichbutr, Pawadee; Houck, John; Doody, David R.; Futran, Neal D.; Upton, Melissa P.; Schwartz, Stephen M.; Chen, Chu (24 January 2012). "Human Papillomavirus–Positive Oral Cavity and Oropharyngeal Cancer Patients Do Not Have Better Quality-of-Life Trajectories". Otolaryngology–Head and Neck Surgery. 146 (5): 739–745. doi:10.1177/0194599811434707. PMC 3535430. PMID 22275190.
- Spanos, William C.; Nowicki, Paul; Lee, Dong Wook; Hoover, Andrew; Hostager, Bruce; Gupta, Anjali; Anderson, Mary E.; Lee, John H. (1 November 2009). "Immune Response During Therapy With Cisplatin or Radiation for Human Papillomavirus–Related Head and Neck Cancer". Archives of Otolaryngology–Head & Neck Surgery. 135 (11): 1137–46. doi:10.1001/archoto.2009.159. PMID 19917928.
- Wansom, Derrick; Light, Emily; Worden, Frank; et al. (20 December 2010). "Correlation of Cellular Immunity With Human Papillomavirus 16 Status and Outcome in Patients With Advanced Oropharyngeal Cancer". Archives of Otolaryngology–Head & Neck Surgery. 136 (12): 1267–73. doi:10.1001/archoto.2010.211. PMC 3342998. PMID 21173378.

===== Surgery =====
- Adelstein, David J.; Ridge, John A.; Brizel, David M.; et al. (December 2012). "Transoral resection of pharyngeal cancer: Summary of a National Cancer Institute Head and Neck Cancer Steering Committee Clinical Trials Planning Meeting, November 6–7, 2011, Arlington, Virginia". Head & Neck. 34 (12): 1681–1703. doi:10.1002/hed.23136. hdl:2027.42/94490. PMC 7721598. PMID 23015475. S2CID 542440.
- de Almeida, John R.; Byrd, James K.; Wu, Rebecca; Stucken, Chaz L.; Duvvuri, Uma; Goldstein, David P.; Miles, Brett A.; Teng, Marita S.; Gupta, Vishal; Genden, Eric M. (September 2014). "A systematic review of transoral robotic surgery and radiotherapy for early oropharynx cancer: A systematic review". The Laryngoscope. 124 (9): 2096–2102. doi:10.1002/lary.24712. PMID 24729006. S2CID 20283441.
- Ambrosch, Petra; Kron, Martina; Pradier, O.; Steiner, W. (2001). "Efficacy of Selective Neck Dissection: A Review of 503 Cases of Elective and Therapeutic Treatment of the Neck in Squamous Cell Carcinoma of the Upper Aerodigestive Tract". Otolaryngology–Head and Neck Surgery. 124 (2): 180–187. doi:10.1067/mhn.2001.111598. PMID 11226954. S2CID 25298496.
- Canis, Martin; Martin, Alexios; Kron, Martina; Konstantinou, Alexandra; Ihler, Friedrich; Wolff, Hendrik A.; Matthias, Christoph; Steiner, Wolfgang (29 December 2012). "Results of transoral laser microsurgery in 102 patients with squamous cell carcinoma of the tonsil". European Archives of Oto-Rhino-Laryngology. 270 (8): 2299–2306. doi:10.1007/s00405-012-2335-6. PMC 3699702. PMID 23274878.
- Chen, Allen M.; Daly, Megan E.; Luu, Quang; Donald, Paul J.; Farwell, D. Gregory (March 2015). "Comparison of functional outcomes and quality of life between transoral surgery and definitive chemoradiotherapy for oropharyngeal cancer". Head & Neck. 37 (3): 381–385. doi:10.1002/hed.23610. PMID 24431059. S2CID 28264800.
- Chia, Stanley H.; Gross, Neil D.; Richmon, Jeremy D. (December 2013). "Surgeon Experience and Complications with Transoral Robotic Surgery (TORS)". Otolaryngology–Head and Neck Surgery. 149 (6): 885–892. doi:10.1177/0194599813503446. PMID 24013139. S2CID 3339804.
- Choby, Garret W.; Kim, Jeehong; Ling, Diane C.; Abberbock, Shira; Mandal, Rajarsi; Kim, Seungwon; Ferris, Robert L.; Duvvuri, Umamaheswar (1 June 2015). "Transoral Robotic Surgery Alone for Oropharyngeal Cancer". JAMA Otolaryngology–Head & Neck Surgery. 141 (6): 499–504. doi:10.1001/jamaoto.2015.0347. PMID 25834991.
- Cohen, Marc A.; Weinstein, Gregory S.; O'Malley, Bert W.; Feldman, Michael; Quon, Harry (April 2011). "Transoral robotic surgery and human papillomavirus status: Oncologic results". Head & Neck. 33 (4): 573–580. doi:10.1002/hed.21500. PMID 21425382. S2CID 24704123.
- Durmus, K; Rangarajan, SV; Old, MO; Agrawal, A; Teknos, TN; Ozer, E (June 2014). "Transoral robotic approach to carcinoma of unknown primary". Head & Neck. 36 (6): 848–52. doi:10.1002/hed.23385. PMC 4266274. PMID 23720223.
- Dziegielewski, Peter T.; Teknos, Theodoros N.; Durmus, Kasim; Old, Matthew; Agrawal, Amit; Kakarala, Kiran; Marcinow, Anna; Ozer, Enver (1 November 2013). "Transoral Robotic Surgery for Oropharyngeal Cancer". JAMA Otolaryngology–Head & Neck Surgery. 139 (11): 1099–108. doi:10.1001/jamaoto.2013.2747. PMC 4274181. PMID 23576186.
- Dowthwaite, Samuel A.; Franklin, Jason H.; Palma, David A.; Fung, Kevin; Yoo, John; Nichols, Anthony C. (2012). "The Role of Transoral Robotic Surgery in the Management of Oropharyngeal Cancer: A Review of the Literature". ISRN Oncology. 2012 945162. doi:10.5402/2012/945162. PMC 3347745. PMID 22606380.
- Genden, Eric M.; Kotz, Tamar; Tong, Charles C. L.; Smith, Claris; Sikora, Andrew G.; Teng, Marita S.; Packer, Stuart H.; Lawson, William L.; Kao, Johnny (August 2011). "Transoral robotic resection and reconstruction for head and neck cancer". The Laryngoscope. 121 (8): 1668–1674. doi:10.1002/lary.21845. PMID 21792953. S2CID 25175486.
- Graboyes, EM; Sinha, P; Thorstad, WL; Rich, JT; Haughey, BH (November 2015). "Management of human papillomavirus-related unknown primaries of the head and neck with a transoral surgical approach". Head & Neck. 37 (11): 1603–11. doi:10.1002/hed.23800. PMID 24931847. S2CID 33000811.
- Haughey, Bruce H.; Hinni, Michael L.; Salassa, John R.; Hayden, Richard E.; Grant, David G.; Rich, Jason T.; Milov, Simon; Lewis, James S.; Krishna, Murli (December 2011). "Transoral laser microsurgery as primary treatment for advanced-stage oropharyngeal cancer: A united states multicenter study". Head & Neck. 33 (12): 1683–1694. doi:10.1002/hed.21669. PMID 21284056. S2CID 10611085.
- Mehta, V; Johnson, P; Tassler, A; Kim, S; Ferris, RL; Nance, M; Johnson, JT; Duvvuri, U (January 2013). "A new paradigm for the diagnosis and management of unknown primary tumors of the head and neck: a role for transoral robotic surgery". The Laryngoscope. 123 (1): 146–151. doi:10.1002/lary.23562. PMID 23154813. S2CID 321364.
- Moore, Eric J.; Hinni, Michael L.; Olsen, Kerry D.; Price, Daniel L.; Laborde, Rebecca R.; Inman, Jared C. (June 2012). "Cost Considerations in the Treatment of Oropharyngeal Squamous Cell Carcinoma". Otolaryngology–Head and Neck Surgery. 146 (6): 946–951. doi:10.1177/0194599812437534. PMID 22344182. S2CID 40004254.
- Moore, Eric J.; Henstrom, Doug K.; Olsen, Kerry D.; Kasperbauer, Jan L.; McGree, Michaela E. (March 2009). "Transoral resection of tonsillar squamous cell carcinoma". The Laryngoscope. 119 (3): 508–515. doi:10.1002/lary.20124. PMID 19235742. S2CID 26256802.
- Moore, Eric J.; Olsen, Kerry D.; Kasperbauer, Jan L. (November 2009). "Transoral robotic surgery for oropharyngeal squamous cell carcinoma: A prospective study of feasibility and functional outcomes". The Laryngoscope. 119 (11): 2156–2164. doi:10.1002/lary.20647. PMID 19824067. S2CID 20097467.
- Moore, Eric J.; Olsen, Steven M.; Laborde, Rebecca R.; García, Joaquín J.; Walsh, Francis J.; Price, Daniel L.; Janus, Jeffrey R.; Kasperbauer, Jan L.; Olsen, Kerry D. (March 2012). "Long-term Functional and Oncologic Results of Transoral Robotic Surgery for Oropharyngeal Squamous Cell Carcinoma". Mayo Clinic Proceedings. 87 (3): 219–225. doi:10.1016/j.mayocp.2011.10.007. PMC 3538408. PMID 22386176.
- Moore, Eric J.; Hinni, Michael L. (April 2013). "Critical Review: Transoral Laser Microsurgery and Robotic-Assisted Surgery for Oropharynx Cancer Including Human Papillomavirus Related Cancer". International Journal of Radiation Oncology, Biology, Physics (Review). 85 (5): 1163–1167. doi:10.1016/j.ijrobp.2012.08.033. PMID 23182390.
- Patel, SA; Magnuson, JS; Holsinger, FC; et al. (November 2013). "Robotic surgery for primary head and neck squamous cell carcinoma of unknown site". JAMA Otolaryngology–Head & Neck Surgery. 139 (11): 1203–1211. doi:10.1001/Jamaoto.2013.5189. PMID 24136446.
- Pollei, Taylor R.; Hinni, Michael L.; Moore, Eric J.; Hayden, Richard E.; Olsen, Kerry D.; Casler, John D.; Walter, Logan C. (1 November 2013). "Analysis of Postoperative Bleeding and Risk Factors in Transoral Surgery of the Oropharynx". JAMA Otolaryngology–Head & Neck Surgery. 139 (11): 1212–8. doi:10.1001/jamaoto.2013.5097. PMID 24113922.
- Rinaldi, V; Pagani, D; Torretta, S; Pignataro, L (26 September 2013). "Transoral robotic surgery in the management of head and neck tumours". Ecancermedicalscience. 7: 359. doi:10.3332/ecancer.2013.359. PMC 3782590. PMID 24073017.
- Sinclair, CF; McColloch, NL; Carroll, WR; Rosenthal, EL; Desmond, RA; Magnuson, JS (November 2011). "Patient-perceived and objective functional outcomes following transoral robotic surgery for early oropharyngeal carcinoma". Archives of Otolaryngology–Head & Neck Surgery. 137 (11): 1112–6. doi:10.1001/archoto.2011.172. PMID 22106235.
- Steiner, Wolfgang; Fierek, Oliver; Ambrosch, Petra; Hommerich, Christian P.; Kron, Martina (1 January 2003). "Transoral Laser Microsurgery for Squamous Cell Carcinoma of the Base of the Tongue". Archives of Otolaryngology–Head & Neck Surgery. 129 (1): 36–43. doi:10.1001/archotol.129.1.36. PMID 12525192.
- Walvekar, Rohan R.; Li, Ryan J.; Gooding, William E.; Gibson, Michael K.; Heron, Dwight; Johnson, Jonas T.; Ferris, Robert L. (December 2008). "Role of Surgery in Limited (T1–2, N0–1) Cancers of the Oropharynx". The Laryngoscope. 118 (12): 2129–2134. doi:10.1097/MLG.0b013e3181857950. PMID 18948826. S2CID 8072424.
- Weinstein, Gregory S.; O'Malley, Bert W.; Magnuson, J. Scott; Carroll, William R.; Olsen, Kerry D.; Daio, Lixia; Moore, Eric J.; Holsinger, F. Christopher (August 2012). "Transoral robotic surgery: A multicenter study to assess feasibility, safety, and surgical margins". The Laryngoscope. 122 (8): 1701–1707. doi:10.1002/lary.23294. PMID 22752997. S2CID 30048884.
- White, Hilliary N.; Moore, Eric J.; Rosenthal, Eben L.; Carroll, William R.; Olsen, Kerry D.; Desmond, Reneé A.; Magnuson, J. Scott (20 December 2010). "Transoral Robotic-Assisted Surgery for Head and Neck Squamous Cell Carcinoma". Archives of Otolaryngology–Head & Neck Surgery. 136 (12): 1248–52. doi:10.1001/archoto.2010.216. PMID 21173375.
- Woolgar, Julia Anne; Triantafyllou, Asterios (November 2005). "A histopathological appraisal of surgical margins in oral and oropharyngeal cancer resection specimens". Oral Oncology. 41 (10): 1034–1043. doi:10.1016/j.oraloncology.2005.06.008. PMID 16129652.

===== Radiation =====
- Adelstein, David J.; Li, Yi; Adams, George L.; Wagner, Henry; Kish, Julie A.; Ensley, John F.; Schuller, David E.; Forastiere, Arlene A. (January 2003). "An Intergroup Phase III Comparison of Standard Radiation Therapy and Two Schedules of Concurrent Chemoradiotherapy in Patients With Unresectable Squamous Cell Head and Neck Cancer". Journal of Clinical Oncology. 21 (1): 92–98. doi:10.1200/JCO.2003.01.008. PMID 12506176.
- Al-Mamgani, Abrahim; van Rooij, Peter; Verduijn, Gerda M.; Mehilal, Robert; Kerrebijn, Jeroen D.; Levendag, Peter C. (February 2013). "The impact of treatment modality and radiation technique on outcomes and toxicity of patients with locally advanced oropharyngeal cancer". The Laryngoscope. 123 (2): 386–393. doi:10.1002/lary.23699. PMID 23404489. S2CID 37351159.
- Bedi, Meena; Firat, Selim; Semenenko, Vladimir A.; Schultz, Christopher; Tripp, Patrick; Byhardt, Roger; Wang, Dian (May 2012). "Elective Lymph Node Irradiation With Intensity-Modulated Radiotherapy: Is Conventional Dose Fractionation Necessary?". International Journal of Radiation Oncology, Biology, Physics. 83 (1): e87–e92. doi:10.1016/j.ijrobp.2011.12.016. PMID 22516389.
- Beitler, Jonathan J.; Zhang, Qiang; Fu, Karen K.; Trotti, Andy; Spencer, Sharon A.; Jones, Christopher U.; Garden, Adam S.; Shenouda, George; Harris, Jonathan; Ang, Kian K. (May 2014). "Final Results of Local-Regional Control and Late Toxicity of RTOG 9003: A Randomized Trial of Altered Fractionation Radiation for Locally Advanced Head and Neck Cancer". International Journal of Radiation Oncology, Biology, Physics. 89 (1): 13–20. doi:10.1016/j.ijrobp.2013.12.027. PMC 4664465. PMID 24613816.
- Bourhis, Jean; Overgaard, Jens; Audry, Hélène; et al. (September 2006). "Hyperfractionated or accelerated radiotherapy in head and neck cancer: a meta-analysis". The Lancet. 368 (9538): 843–854. doi:10.1016/S0140-6736(06)69121-6. PMID 16950362. S2CID 20670949.
- Caudell, Jimmy J.; Schaner, Philip E.; Desmond, Renee A.; Meredith, Ruby F.; Spencer, Sharon A.; Bonner, James A. (February 2010). "Dosimetric Factors Associated With Long-Term Dysphagia After Definitive Radiotherapy for Squamous Cell Carcinoma of the Head and Neck". International Journal of Radiation Oncology, Biology, Physics. 76 (2): 403–409. doi:10.1016/j.ijrobp.2009.02.017. PMID 19467801.
- Chen, Allen M.; Li, Judy; Beckett, Laurel A.; Zhara, Talia; Farwell, Gregory; Lau, Derick H.; Gandour-Edwards, Regina; Vaughan, Andrew T.; Purdy, James A. (January 2013). "Differential response rates to irradiation among patients with human papillomavirus positive and negative oropharyngeal cancer". The Laryngoscope. 123 (1): 152–157. doi:10.1002/lary.23570. PMID 23008061. S2CID 5106261.
- Chin, Re-I; Spencer, Christopher R.; DeWees, Todd; et al. (November 2016). "Reevaluation of postoperative radiation dose in the management of human papillomavirus-positive oropharyngeal cancer". Head & Neck. 38 (11): 1643–1649. doi:10.1002/hed.24486. PMID 27152851. S2CID 3577182.
- Cramer, John David; Ferris, Robert L.; Duvvuri, Umamaheswar (20 May 2018). "Treatment deintensification to surgery only for stage I human papillomavirus-associated oropharyngeal cancer". Journal of Clinical Oncology. 36 (15 supplement): 6003. doi:10.1200/JCO.2018.36.15_suppl.6003.
- Daly, Megan E.; Le, Quynh-Thu; Maxim, Peter G.; Loo, Billy W.; Kaplan, Michael J.; Fischbein, Nancy J.; Pinto, Harlan; Chang, Daniel T. (April 2010). "Intensity-Modulated Radiotherapy in the Treatment of Oropharyngeal Cancer: Clinical Outcomes and Patterns of Failure". International Journal of Radiation Oncology, Biology, Physics. 76 (5): 1339–1346. doi:10.1016/j.ijrobp.2009.04.006. PMID 19540068.
- Deasy, Joseph O.; Moiseenko, Vitali; Marks, Lawrence; Chao, K.S. Clifford; Nam, Jiho; Eisbruch, Avraham (March 2010). "Radiotherapy Dose–Volume Effects on Salivary Gland Function". International Journal of Radiation Oncology, Biology, Physics. 76 (3): S58–S63. doi:10.1016/j.ijrobp.2009.06.090. PMC 4041494. PMID 20171519.
- Dok, Rüveyda; Kalev, Peter; Van Limbergen, Evert Jan; Asbagh, Layka Abbasi; Vázquez, Iria; Hauben, Esther; Sablina, Anna; Nuyts, Sandra (15 March 2014). "p16INK4a Impairs Homologous Recombination–Mediated DNA Repair in Human Papillomavirus–Positive Head and Neck Tumors". Cancer Research. 74 (6): 1739–1751. doi:10.1158/0008-5472.CAN-13-2479. hdl:2454/52898. PMID 24473065.
- Feng, Felix Y.; Kim, Hyungjin M.; Lyden, Teresa H.; Haxer, Marc J.; Feng, Mary; Worden, Frank P.; Chepeha, Douglas B.; Eisbruch, Avraham (August 2007). "Intensity-Modulated Radiotherapy of Head and Neck Cancer Aiming to Reduce Dysphagia: Early Dose–Effect Relationships for the Swallowing Structures". International Journal of Radiation Oncology, Biology, Physics. 68 (5): 1289–1298. doi:10.1016/j.ijrobp.2007.02.049. PMID 17560051.
- Forastiere, Arlene A.; Zhang, Qiang; Weber, Randal S.; et al. (March 2013). "Long-Term Results of RTOG 91-11: A Comparison of Three Nonsurgical Treatment Strategies to Preserve the Larynx in Patients With Locally Advanced Larynx Cancer". Journal of Clinical Oncology. 31 (7): 845–852. doi:10.1200/JCO.2012.43.6097. PMC 3577950. PMID 23182993.
- Fu, Karen K.; Pajak, Thomas F.; Trotti, Andy; Jones, Christopher U.; Spencer, Sharon A.; Phillips, Theodore L.; Garden, Adam S.; Ridge, John A.; Cooper, Jay S.; Ang, K.Kian (August 2000). "A radiation therapy oncology group (RTOG) phase III randomized study to compare hyperfractionation and two variants of accelerated fractionation to standard fractionation radiotherapy for head and neck squamous cell carcinomas: first report of RTOG 9003". International Journal of Radiation Oncology, Biology, Physics. 48 (1): 7–16. doi:10.1016/S0360-3016(00)00663-5. PMID 10924966.
- Garden, Adam S.; Dong, Lei; Morrison, William H.; et al. (March 2013). "Patterns of Disease Recurrence Following Treatment of Oropharyngeal Cancer With Intensity Modulated Radiation Therapy". International Journal of Radiation Oncology, Biology, Physics. 85 (4): 941–947. doi:10.1016/j.ijrobp.2012.08.004. PMID 22975604.
- Heymach, John; Krilov, Lada; Alberg, Anthony; Baxter, Nancy; Chang, Susan Marina; Corcoran, Ryan B.; Dale, William; DeMichele, Angela; Magid Diefenbach, Catherine S.; Dreicer, Robert; Epstein, Andrew S.; Gillison, Maura L.; Graham, David L.; Jones, Joshua; Ko, Andrew H.; Lopez, Ana Maria; Maki, Robert G.; Rodriguez-Galindo, Carlos; Schilsky, Richard L.; Sznol, Mario; Westin, Shannon Neville; Burstein, Harold (April 2018). "Clinical Cancer Advances 2018: Annual Report on Progress Against Cancer From the American Society of Clinical Oncology". Journal of Clinical Oncology. 36 (10): 1020–1044. doi:10.1200/JCO.2017.77.0446. PMID 29380678.
- Kramer, Simon; Gelber, Richard D.; Snow, James B.; Marcial, Victor A.; Lowry, Louis D.; Davis, Lawrence W.; Chandler, Richard (September 1987). "Combined radiation therapy and surgery in the management of advanced head and neck cancer: Final report of study 73-03 of the radiation therapy oncology group". Head & Neck Surgery. 10 (1): 19–30. doi:10.1002/hed.2890100105. PMID 3449477.
- Langendijk, Johannes A.; Doornaert, Patricia; Verdonck-de Leeuw, Irma M.; Leemans, Charles R.; Aaronson, Neil K.; Slotman, Ben J. (August 2008). "Impact of Late Treatment-Related Toxicity on Quality of Life Among Patients With Head and Neck Cancer Treated With Radiotherapy". Journal of Clinical Oncology. 26 (22): 3770–3776. doi:10.1200/JCO.2007.14.6647. PMID 18669465.
- Levendag, Peter C.; Teguh, David N.; Voet, Peter; et al. (October 2007). "Dysphagia disorders in patients with cancer of the oropharynx are significantly affected by the radiation therapy dose to the superior and middle constrictor muscle: A dose-effect relationship". Radiotherapy and Oncology. 85 (1): 64–73. doi:10.1016/j.radonc.2007.07.009. PMID 17714815.
- Li, Baoqing; Li, Dan; Lau, Derick H; Farwell, D Gregory; Luu, Quang; Rocke, David M; Newman, Kathleen; Courquin, Jean; Purdy, James A; Chen, Allen M (2009). "Clinical-dosimetric analysis of measures of dysphagia including gastrostomy-tube dependence among head and neck cancer patients treated definitively by intensity-modulated radiotherapy with concurrent chemotherapy". Radiation Oncology. 4 (1): 52. doi:10.1186/1748-717X-4-52. PMC 2785826. PMID 19909531.
- Maccomb, WS; Fletcher, GH (March 1957). "Planned combination of surgery and radiation in treatment of advanced primary head and neck cancers". The American Journal of Roentgenology, Radium Therapy, and Nuclear Medicine. 77 (3): 397–414. PMID 13403033.
- Monroe, Marcus M.; Buchmann, Luke O.; Hunt, Jason P.; Hitchcock, Ying J.; Lloyd, Shane; Hashibe, Mia (April 2017). "The Benefit of Adjuvant Radiation in Surgically-Treated T1–2 N1 Oropharyngeal Squamous Cell Carcinoma". Laryngoscope Investigative Otolaryngology. 2 (2): 57–62. doi:10.1002/lio2.64. PMC 5527368. PMID 28894823.
- O'Sullivan, B; Warde, P; Grice, B; Goh, C; Payne, D; Liu, F.-F; Waldron, J; Bayley, A; Irish, J; Gullane, P; Cummings, B (October 2001). "The benefits and pitfalls of ipsilateral radiotherapy in carcinoma of the tonsillar region". International Journal of Radiation Oncology, Biology, Physics. 51 (2): 332–343. doi:10.1016/S0360-3016(01)01613-3. PMID 11567806.
- Parsons, James T.; Mendenhall, William M.; Stringer, Scott P.; et al. (1 June 2002). "Squamous cell carcinoma of the oropharynx: Surgery, radiation therapy, or both". Cancer. 94 (11): 2967–2980. doi:10.1002/cncr.10567. PMID 12115386. S2CID 34438428.
- Peters, Lester J; Goepfert, Helmuth; Ang, K.Kian; et al. (April 1993). "Evaluation of the dose for postoperative radiation therapy of head and neck cancer: First report of a prospective randomized trial". International Journal of Radiation Oncology, Biology, Physics. 26 (1): 3–11. doi:10.1016/0360-3016(93)90167-T. PMID 8482629.
- Rich, Jason T.; Milov, Simon; Lewis, James S.; Thorstad, Wade L.; Adkins, Douglas R.; Haughey, Bruce H. (September 2009). "Transoral laser microsurgery (TLM) ± adjuvant therapy for advanced stage oropharyngeal cancer". The Laryngoscope. 119 (9): 1709–1719. doi:10.1002/lary.20552. PMC 3877921. PMID 19572271.
- Robin, Tyler P.; Gan, Gregory N.; Tam, Moses; Westerly, David; Riaz, Nadeem; Karam, Sana D.; Lee, Nancy; Raben, David (April 2016). "Safety of contralateral submandibular gland sparing in locally advanced oropharyngeal cancers: A multicenter review". Head & Neck. 38 (4): 506–511. doi:10.1002/hed.23928. PMID 25482748. S2CID 2317606.
- Rosenthal, David I.; Mohamed, Abdallah S.R.; Garden, Adam S.; Morrison, William H.; El-Naggar, Adel K.; Kamal, Mona; Weber, Randal S.; Fuller, Clifton D.; Peters, Lester J. (August 2017). "Final Report of a Prospective Randomized Trial to Evaluate the Dose-Response Relationship for Postoperative Radiation Therapy and Pathologic Risk Groups in Patients With Head and Neck Cancer". International Journal of Radiation Oncology, Biology, Physics. 98 (5): 1002–1011. doi:10.1016/j.ijrobp.2017.02.218. PMC 5518636. PMID 28721881.
- Sher, David J.; Adelstein, David J.; Bajaj, Gopal K.; et al. (July 2017). "Radiation therapy for oropharyngeal squamous cell carcinoma: Executive summary of an ASTRO Evidence-Based Clinical Practice Guideline". Practical Radiation Oncology. 7 (4): 246–253. doi:10.1016/j.prro.2017.02.002. PMID 28428019.
- Tsai, Chiaojung Jillian; Jackson, Andrew; Setton, Jeremy; Riaz, Nadeem; McBride, Sean; Leeman, Jonathan; Kowalski, Alex; Happersett, Laura; Lee, Nancy Y. (November 2017). "Modeling Dose Response for Late Dysphagia in Patients With Head and Neck Cancer in the Modern Era of Definitive Chemoradiation". JCO Clinical Cancer Informatics. 1 (1): 1–7. doi:10.1200/cci.17.00070. PMC 6873915. PMID 30657398.
- Vikram, Bhadrasain; Strong, Elliot W.; Shah, Jatin P.; Spiro, Ronald (January 1984). "Failure at the primary site following multimodality treatment in advanced head and neck cancer". Head & Neck Surgery. 6 (3): 720–723. doi:10.1002/hed.2890060303. PMID 6693287.
- Tupchong, Leslie; Phil, D.; Scott, Charles B.; et al. (January 1991). "Randomized study of preoperative versus postoperative radiation therapy in advanced head and neck carcinoma: Long-term follow-up of RTOG study 73-03". International Journal of Radiation Oncology, Biology, Physics. 20 (1): 21–28. doi:10.1016/0360-3016(91)90133-O. PMID 1993628.
- Woody, Neil M.; Koyfman, Shlomo A.; Xia, Ping; et al. (February 2016). "Regional control is preserved after dose de-escalated radiotherapy to involved lymph nodes in HPV positive oropharyngeal cancer". Oral Oncology. 53: 91–96. doi:10.1016/j.oraloncology.2015.11.004. PMID 26711089.

===== Chemotherapy and chemoradiation =====
- Ang, K. Kian; Zhang, Qiang; Rosenthal, David I.; et al. (20 September 2014). "Randomized Phase III Trial of Concurrent Accelerated Radiation Plus Cisplatin With or Without Cetuximab for Stage III to IV Head and Neck Carcinoma: RTOG 0522". Journal of Clinical Oncology. 32 (27): 2940–2950. doi:10.1200/JCO.2013.53.5633. PMC 4162493. PMID 25154822.
- Bachaud, Jean-Marc; Cohen-Jonathan, Elizabeth; Alzieu, Claude; David, Jean-Marc; Serrano, Elie; Daly-Schveitzer, Nicolas (December 1996). "Combined postoperative radiotherapy and Weekly Cisplatin infusion for locally advanced head and neck carcinoma: Final report of a randomized trial". International Journal of Radiation Oncology, Biology, Physics. 36 (5): 999–1004. doi:10.1016/S0360-3016(96)00430-0. PMID 8985019.
- Bernier, Jacques; Domenge, Christian; Ozsahin, Mahmut; et al. (6 May 2004). "Postoperative Irradiation with or without Concomitant Chemotherapy for Locally Advanced Head and Neck Cancer". New England Journal of Medicine. 350 (19): 1945–1952. doi:10.1056/NEJMoa032641. PMID 15128894.
- Bernier, Jacques; Cooper, Jay S.; Pajak, T. F.; et al. (October 2005). "Defining risk levels in locally advanced head and neck cancers: A comparative analysis of concurrent postoperative radiation plus chemotherapy trials of the EORTC (#22931) and RTOG (# 9501)". Head & Neck. 27 (10): 843–850. doi:10.1002/hed.20279. PMID 16161069. S2CID 13746453.
- Blanchard, Pierre; Baujat, Bertrand; Holostenco, Victoria; Bourredjem, Abderrahmane; Baey, Charlotte; Bourhis, Jean; Pignon, Jean-Pierre (July 2011). "Meta-analysis of chemotherapy in head and neck cancer (MACH-NC): A comprehensive analysis by tumour site". Radiotherapy and Oncology. 100 (1): 33–40. doi:10.1016/j.radonc.2011.05.036. PMID 21684027.
- Bonner, James A; Harari, Paul M; Giralt, Jordi; et al. (January 2010). "Radiotherapy plus cetuximab for locoregionally advanced head and neck cancer: 5-year survival data from a phase 3 randomised trial, and relation between cetuximab-induced rash and survival". The Lancet Oncology. 11 (1): 21–28. doi:10.1016/S1470-2045(09)70311-0. PMID 19897418.
- Calais, Gilles; Bardet, Etienne; Sire, Christian; Alfonsi, Marc; Bourhis, Jean; Rhein, Béatrix; Tortochaux, Jacques; Man, Yooye Tao Kong; Auvray, Hugues; Garaud, Pascal (January 2004). "Radiotherapy with concomitant weekly docetaxel for Stages III/IV oropharynx carcinoma. Results of the 98-02 GORTEC Phase II trial". International Journal of Radiation Oncology, Biology, Physics. 58 (1): 161–166. doi:10.1016/S0360-3016(03)01370-1. PMID 14697434.
- Chen, Allen M; Felix, Carol; Wang, Pin-Chieh; et al. (June 2017). "Reduced-dose radiotherapy for human papillomavirus-associated squamous-cell carcinoma of the oropharynx: a single-arm, phase 2 study". The Lancet Oncology (Submitted manuscript). 18 (6): 803–811. doi:10.1016/S1470-2045(17)30246-2. PMC 6488353. PMID 28434660.
- Chera, Bhishamjit S.; Amdur, Robert J.; Tepper, Joel; et al. (December 2015). "Phase 2 Trial of De-intensified Chemoradiation Therapy for Favorable-Risk Human Papillomavirus–Associated Oropharyngeal Squamous Cell Carcinoma". International Journal of Radiation Oncology, Biology, Physics. 93 (5): 976–985. doi:10.1016/j.ijrobp.2015.08.033. PMID 26581135.
- Cmelak, Anthony J.; Li, Sigui; Goldwasser, Meredith A.; Murphy, Barbara; Cannon, Michael; Pinto, Harlan; Rosenthal, David I.; Gillison, Maura; Forastiere, Arlene A. (September 2007). "Phase II Trial of Chemoradiation for Organ Preservation in Resectable Stage III or IV Squamous Cell Carcinomas of the Larynx or Oropharynx: Results of Eastern Cooperative Oncology Group Study E2399". Journal of Clinical Oncology. 25 (25): 3971–3977. doi:10.1200/JCO.2007.10.8951. PMID 17761982.
- Cohen, EE; Karrison, TG; Kocherginsky, M; et al. (1 September 2014). "Phase III randomized trial of induction chemotherapy in patients with N2 or N3 locally advanced head and neck cancer". Journal of Clinical Oncology. 32 (25): 2735–43. doi:10.1200/JCO.2013.54.6309. PMC 4876357. PMID 25049329.
- Cooper, Jay S.; Pajak, Thomas F.; Forastiere, Arlene A.; et al. (6 May 2004). "Postoperative Concurrent Radiotherapy and Chemotherapy for High-Risk Squamous-Cell Carcinoma of the Head and Neck". New England Journal of Medicine. 350 (19): 1937–1944. doi:10.1056/NEJMoa032646. PMID 15128893.
- Cooper, Jay S.; Zhang, Qiang; Pajak, Thomas F.; et al. (December 2012). "Long-term Follow-up of the RTOG 9501/Intergroup Phase III Trial: Postoperative Concurrent Radiation Therapy and Chemotherapy in High-Risk Squamous Cell Carcinoma of the Head and Neck". International Journal of Radiation Oncology, Biology, Physics. 84 (5): 1198–1205. doi:10.1016/j.ijrobp.2012.05.008. PMC 3465463. PMID 22749632.
- Diaz, Roberto; Jaboin, Jerry J.; Morales-Paliza, Manuel; et al. (June 2010). "Hypothyroidism as a Consequence of Intensity-Modulated Radiotherapy With Concurrent Taxane-Based Chemotherapy for Locally Advanced Head-and-Neck Cancer". International Journal of Radiation Oncology, Biology, Physics. 77 (2): 468–476. doi:10.1016/j.ijrobp.2009.05.018. PMID 19577867.
- Eisbruch, Avraham; Schwartz, Marco; Rasch, Coen; Vineberg, Karen; Damen, Eugene; Van As, Corina J.; Marsh, Robin; Pameijer, Frank A.; Balm, Alfons J.M. (December 2004). "Dysphagia and aspiration after chemoradiotherapy for head-and-neck cancer: Which anatomic structures are affected and can they be spared by IMRT?". International Journal of Radiation Oncology, Biology, Physics. 60 (5): 1425–1439. doi:10.1016/j.ijrobp.2004.05.050. PMID 15590174.
- Eriksen, J. G.; Lassen, P.; Overgaard, J. (2010). "Do all patients with head and neck cancer benefit from radiotherapy and concurrent cetuximab?". The Lancet Oncology. 11 (4): 312–313. doi:10.1016/S1470-2045(10)70035-8. PMID 20359659.
- Givens, Daniel J.; Karnell, Lucy Hynds; Gupta, Anjali K.; Clamon, Gerald H.; Pagedar, Nitin A.; Chang, Kristi E.; Van Daele, Douglas J.; Funk, Gerry F. (21 December 2009). "Adverse Events Associated With Concurrent Chemoradiation Therapy in Patients With Head and Neck Cancer". Archives of Otolaryngology–Head & Neck Surgery. 135 (12): 1209–17. doi:10.1001/archoto.2009.174. PMID 20026818.
- Haddad, R; O'Neill, A; Rabinowits, G; et al. (March 2013). "Induction chemotherapy followed by concurrent chemoradiotherapy (sequential chemoradiotherapy) versus concurrent chemoradiotherapy alone in locally advanced head and neck cancer (PARADIGM): a randomised phase 3 trial". The Lancet Oncology. 14 (3): 257–64. doi:10.1016/S1470-2045(13)70011-1. PMID 23414589.
- Hall, S.F.; Irish, J.C.; Gregg, R.W.; Groome, P.A.; Rohland, S. (8 January 2015). "Adherence to and uptake of clinical practice guidelines: lessons learned from a clinical practice guideline on chemotherapy concomitant with radiotherapy in head-and-neck cancer". Current Oncology. 22 (2): e61–8. doi:10.3747/co.22.2235. PMC 4399625. PMID 25908922.
- Hall, Stephen F; Liu, Fei-Fei; O'Sullivan, Brian; Shi, Willa; Rohland, Susan; Griffiths, Rebecca; Groome, Patti (22 August 2017). "Did the addition of concurrent chemotherapy to conventional radiotherapy improve survival for patients with HPV+ve and HPV−ve Oropharynx cancer? A population-based study". British Journal of Cancer. 117 (8): 1105–1112. doi:10.1038/bjc.2017.275. PMC 5674099. PMID 28829763.
- Hunter, Klaudia U.; Schipper, Matthew; Feng, Felix Y.; Lyden, Teresa; Haxer, Mark; Murdoch-Kinch, Carol-Anne; Cornwall, Benjamin; Lee, Connie S.Y.; Chepeha, Douglas B.; Eisbruch, Avraham (March 2013). "Toxicities Affecting Quality of Life After Chemo-IMRT of Oropharyngeal Cancer: Prospective Study of Patient-Reported, Observer-Rated, and Objective Outcomes". International Journal of Radiation Oncology, Biology, Physics. 85 (4): 935–940. doi:10.1016/j.ijrobp.2012.08.030. PMC 3556374. PMID 23040224.
- Machtay, Mitchell; Moughan, Jennifer; Trotti, Andrew; Garden, Adam S.; Weber, Randal S.; Cooper, Jay S.; Forastiere, Arlene; Ang, K. Kian (20 July 2008). "Factors Associated With Severe Late Toxicity After Concurrent Chemoradiation for Locally Advanced Head and Neck Cancer: An RTOG Analysis". Journal of Clinical Oncology. 26 (21): 3582–3589. doi:10.1200/JCO.2007.14.8841. PMC 4911537. PMID 18559875.
- Marur, Shanthi; Li, Shuli; Cmelak, Anthony J.; et al. (10 February 2017). "E1308: Phase II Trial of Induction Chemotherapy Followed by Reduced-Dose Radiation and Weekly Cetuximab in Patients With HPV-Associated Resectable Squamous Cell Carcinoma of the Oropharynx— ECOG-ACRIN Cancer Research Group". Journal of Clinical Oncology. 35 (5): 490–497. doi:10.1200/JCO.2016.68.3300. PMC 5455313. PMID 28029303.
- Nguyen-Tan, Phuc Felix; Zhang, Qiang; Ang, K. Kian; et al. (December 2014). "Randomized Phase III Trial to Test Accelerated Versus Standard Fractionation in Combination With Concurrent Cisplatin for Head and Neck Carcinomas in the Radiation Therapy Oncology Group 0129 Trial: Long-Term Report of Efficacy and Toxicity". Journal of Clinical Oncology. 32 (34): 3858–3867. doi:10.1200/JCO.2014.55.3925. PMC 4239304. PMID 25366680.
- Olson, Brennan; Clayburgh, Daniel R (30 August 2017). Utility of adjuvant therapy for pN1 oropharyngeal carcinoma. Oral presentations. Annual Meeting of the American Academy of Otolaryngology, Chicago, September 10–13, 2017. Otolaryngology–Head and Neck Surgery. Vol. 157, no. 1 suppl. pp. 40–P173. doi:10.1177/0194599817717251d. PMID 28854010.
- Owadally, Waheeda; Hurt, Chris; Timmins, Hayley; et al. (27 August 2015). "PATHOS: a phase II/III trial of risk-stratified, reduced intensity adjuvant treatment in patients undergoing transoral surgery for Human papillomavirus (HPV) positive oropharyngeal cancer". BMC Cancer. 15 (1): 602. doi:10.1186/s12885-015-1598-x. PMC 4549836. PMID 26311526.
- Pignon, Jean-Pierre; le Maître, Aurélie; Bourhis, Jean (October 2007). "Meta-Analyses of Chemotherapy in Head and Neck Cancer (MACH-NC): An Update". International Journal of Radiation Oncology, Biology, Physics. 69 (2): S112–S114. doi:10.1016/j.ijrobp.2007.04.088. PMID 17848275.
- Posner, M. R.; Lorch, J. H.; Goloubeva, O.; Tan, M.; Schumaker, L. M.; Sarlis, N. J.; Haddad, R. I.; Cullen, K. J. (May 2011). "Survival and human papillomavirus in oropharynx cancer in TAX 324: a subset analysis from an international phase III trial". Annals of Oncology. 22 (5): 1071–1077. doi:10.1093/annonc/mdr006. PMC 4351352. PMID 21317223.
- Seiwert, T.; Melotek, J.M.; Foster, C.C.; Blair, E.A.; Karrison, T.G.; Agrawal, N.; Portugal, L.; Gooi, Z.; Stenson, K.M.; Brisson, R.J.; Arshad, S.; Dekker, A.; Kochanny, S.; Saloura, V.; Spiotto, M.T.; Villaflor, V.M.; Haraf, D.J.; Vokes, E.E. (April 2018). "OPTIMA—A Phase 2 Trial of Induction Chemotherapy Response-Stratified Radiation Therapy Dose and Volume De-escalation for HPV+ Oropharyngeal Cancer: Efficacy, Toxicity, and HPV Subtype Analysis". International Journal of Radiation Oncology, Biology, Physics. 100 (5): 1309. doi:10.1016/j.ijrobp.2017.12.025.
- Su, William; Liu, Jerry; Miles, Brett A.; Genden, Eric M.; Misiukiewicz, Krzysztof J.; Posner, Marshall; Gupta, Vishal; Bakst, Richard L.; Chu, Pei-Yi (8 December 2016). "Adjuvant Radiation Therapy Alone for HPV Related Oropharyngeal Cancers with High Risk Features". PLOS One. 11 (12) e0168061. Bibcode:2016PLoSO..1168061S. doi:10.1371/journal.pone.0168061. PMC 5145232. PMID 27930732.
- Szturz, Petr; Seiwert, Tanguy Y.; Vermorken, Jan B. (10 July 2017). "How Standard Is Second-Line Cetuximab in Recurrent or Metastatic Head and Neck Cancer in 2017?". Journal of Clinical Oncology. 35 (20): 2229–2231. doi:10.1200/JCO.2016.71.8072. PMID 28471725.
- Vlacich, Gregory; Spratt, Daniel E.; Diaz, Roberto; Phillips, John G.; Crass, Jostin; Li, Chung-I; Shyr, Yu; Cmelak, Anthony J. (March 2014). "Dose to the inferior pharyngeal constrictor predicts prolonged gastrostomy tube dependence with concurrent intensity-modulated radiation therapy and chemotherapy for locally-advanced head and neck cancer". Radiotherapy and Oncology. 110 (3): 435–440. doi:10.1016/j.radonc.2013.12.007. PMID 24440043.
- Wirth, Lori J. (20 April 2016). "Cetuximab in Human Papillomavirus?Positive Oropharynx Carcinoma". Journal of Clinical Oncology. 34 (12): 1289–1291. doi:10.1200/JCO.2015.65.1414. PMID 26884569.

===== Deintensification =====
- An, Yi; Holsinger, F. Christopher; Husain, Zain A. (20 December 2016). "De-intensification of adjuvant therapy in human papillomavirus-associated oropharyngeal cancer". Cancers of the Head & Neck (Review). 1 (1): 18. doi:10.1186/s41199-016-0016-7. PMC 6460758. PMID 31093347.
- Arnaoutakis, Demetri; Sumer, Baran D. (10 August 2017). "Treatment Deintensification for Human Papillomavirus-Associated Oropharyngeal Cancer". Annals of Surgical Oncology. 24 (12): 3463–3465. doi:10.1245/s10434-017-6045-6. PMID 28799138.
- Brotherston, Drew C.; Poon, Ian; Le, Tuyen; Leung, Martin; Kiss, Alex; Ringash, Jolie; Balogh, Judith; Lee, Justin; Wright, James R. (February 2013). "Patient preferences for oropharyngeal cancer treatment de-escalation". Head & Neck. 35 (2): 151–159. doi:10.1002/hed.22930. PMID 22431201. S2CID 30301638.
- Chera, Bhishamjit S.; Amdur, Robert J. (January 2018). "Current Status and Future Directions of Treatment Deintensification in Human Papilloma Virus-associated Oropharyngeal Squamous Cell Carcinoma". Seminars in Radiation Oncology. 28 (1): 27–34. doi:10.1016/j.semradonc.2017.08.001. PMID 29173753.
- Kelly, Jacqueline R.; Husain, Zain A.; Burtness, Barbara (November 2016). "Treatment de-intensification strategies for head and neck cancer". European Journal of Cancer. 68: 125–133. doi:10.1016/j.ejca.2016.09.006. PMC 5734050. PMID 27755996.
- Ma, D.J.; Price, K.; Moore, E.J.; Patel, S.H.; Hinni, M.L.; Chintakuntlawar, A.V.; Garcia, J.J.; Graner, D.; Neben-Wittich, M.A.; Garces, Y.; Hallemeier, C.L.; Price, D.L.; Kasperbauer, J.L.; Janus, J.R.; Foster, N.R.; Foote, R.L. (December 2017). "Two-Year Results for MC1273, a Phase 2 Evaluation of Aggressive Dose De- Escalation for Adjuvant Chemoradiation in HPV+ Oropharynx Squamous Cell Carcinoma (OPSCC)". International Journal of Radiation Oncology, Biology, Physics. 99 (5): 1320. doi:10.1016/j.ijrobp.2017.09.021.
- Masterson, L; Moualed, D; Liu, ZW; et al. (October 2014). "De-escalation treatment protocols for human papillomavirus-associated oropharyngeal squamous cell carcinoma: a systematic review and meta-analysis of current clinical trials". European Journal of Cancer. 50 (15): 2636–48. doi:10.1016/j.ejca.2014.07.001. PMID 25091798.
- Mirghani, H.; Amen, F.; Blanchard, P.; Moreau, F.; Guigay, J.; Hartl, D.M.; Lacau St Guily, J. (April 2015). "Treatment de-escalation in HPV-positive oropharyngeal carcinoma: Ongoing trials, critical issues and perspectives". International Journal of Cancer. 136 (7): 1494–1503. doi:10.1002/ijc.28847. PMID 24622970. S2CID 21854274.
- Mirghani, Haitham; Blanchard, Pierre (January 2018). "Treatment de-escalation for HPV-driven oropharyngeal cancer: Where do we stand?". Clinical and Translational Radiation Oncology. 8: 4–11. doi:10.1016/j.ctro.2017.10.005. PMC 5862680. PMID 29594236.
- Quon, Harry; Richmon, Jeremy D. (August 2012). "Treatment Deintensification Strategies for HPV-Associated Head and Neck Carcinomas". Otolaryngologic Clinics of North America. 45 (4): 845–861. doi:10.1016/j.otc.2012.04.007. PMID 22793856.

==== Prognosis ====
- Al-Mamgani, Abrahim; van Werkhoven, Erik; Navran, Arash; Karakullukcu, Baris; Hamming-Vrieze, Olga; Machiels, Melanie; van der Velden, Lilly-Ann; Vogel, Wouter V.; Klop, W. Martin (September 2017). "Contralateral regional recurrence after elective unilateral neck irradiation in oropharyngeal carcinoma: A literature-based critical review". Cancer Treatment Reviews. 59: 102–108. doi:10.1016/j.ctrv.2017.07.004. PMID 28779635.
- Ang, K. K.; Harris, J.; Wheeler, R.; et al. (2010). "Human Papillomavirus and Survival of Patients with Oropharyngeal Cancer". New England Journal of Medicine. 363 (1): 24–35. doi:10.1056/NEJMoa0912217. PMC 2943767. PMID 20530316.
- Bhattasali, O.; Thompson, L.D.; Schumacher, A.; Iganej, S. (April 2018). "Nodal Radiographic Prognostic Factors in the New Stage I p16-Positive Oropharyngeal Cancer of the AJCC 8th Edition: Is All N1 Disease the Same?". International Journal of Radiation Oncology, Biology, Physics. 99 (2): S137. doi:10.1016/j.ijrobp.2017.06.317.
- Chernock, R. D.; El-mofty, S. K.; Thorstad, W. L.; Parvin, C. A.; Lewis, J. S. (2009). "HPV-Related Nonkeratinizing Squamous Cell Carcinoma of the Oropharynx: Utility of Microscopic Features in Predicting Patient Outcome". Head and Neck Pathology. 3 (3): 186–194. doi:10.1007/s12105-009-0126-1. PMC 2811624. PMID 20596971.
- Fakhry, Carole; Zhang, Qiang; Nguyen-Tân, Phuc Felix; et al. (4 August 2017). "Development and Validation of Nomograms Predictive of Overall and Progression-Free Survival in Patients With Oropharyngeal Cancer". Journal of Clinical Oncology. 35 (36): 4057–4065. doi:10.1200/JCO.2016.72.0748. PMC 5736236. PMID 28777690.
- Fischer, C. A.; Kampmann, M.; Zlobec, I.; Green, E.; Tornillo, L.; Lugli, A.; Wolfensberger, M.; Terracciano, L. M. (27 April 2010). "p16 expression in oropharyngeal cancer: its impact on staging and prognosis compared with the conventional clinical staging parameters" (PDF). Annals of Oncology. 21 (10): 1961–1966. doi:10.1093/annonc/mdq210. PMID 20423915.
- Gillison, Maura L. (20 December 2006). "Human Papillomavirus and Prognosis of Oropharyngeal Squamous Cell Carcinoma: Implications for Clinical Research in Head and Neck Cancers". Journal of Clinical Oncology (Editorial). 24 (36): 5623–5625. doi:10.1200/JCO.2006.07.1829. PMID 17179099.
- Gillison, Maura L.; Zhang, Qiang; Jordan, Richard; Xiao, Weihong; Westra, William H.; Trotti, Andy; Spencer, Sharon; Harris, Jonathan; Chung, Christine H.; Ang, K. Kian (10 June 2012). "Tobacco Smoking and Increased Risk of Death and Progression for Patients With p16-Positive and p16-Negative Oropharyngeal Cancer". Journal of Clinical Oncology. 30 (17): 2102–2111. doi:10.1200/JCO.2011.38.4099. PMC 3397696. PMID 22565003.
- Hafkamp, Harriët C.; Manni, J.J.; Haesevoets, A.; Voogd, A.C.; Schepers, M.; Bot, F.J.; Hopman, A.H.N.; Ramaekers, F.C.S.; Speel, Ernst-Jan M. (15 June 2008). "Marked differences in survival rate between smokers and nonsmokers with HPV 16-associated tonsillar carcinomas". International Journal of Cancer. 122 (12): 2656–2664. doi:10.1002/ijc.23458. PMID 18360824. S2CID 25320075.
- Haughey, Bruce H.; Sinha, Parul (September 2012). "Prognostic factors and survival unique to surgically treated p16+ oropharyngeal cancer". The Laryngoscope. 122 (S2): S13–S33. doi:10.1002/lary.23493. PMID 22926949. S2CID 31772853.
- Huang, Shao Hui; Waldron, John N.; Milosevic, Michael; et al. (15 February 2015). "Prognostic value of pretreatment circulating neutrophils, monocytes, and lymphocytes in oropharyngeal cancer stratified by human papillomavirus status". Cancer. 121 (4): 545–555. doi:10.1002/cncr.29100. PMID 25336438. S2CID 926930.
- Huang, K.; Banerjee, R.N.; Debenham, B.; Patel, A.; Sabiq, F.; Harold, L.; Skarsgard, D.P.; Lysack, J.; Ghosh, S.; Quon, H.C. (April 2018). "What's the Matter With Matted Nodes? Significance of Matted Lymph Nodes in HPV-Related Oropharyngeal Squamous Cell Carcinoma: A Multi-institutional Population-Based Cohort Study". International Journal of Radiation Oncology, Biology, Physics. 100 (5): 1328. doi:10.1016/j.ijrobp.2017.12.059.
- de Jong, M. C.; Pramana, J.; Knegjens, J. L.; Balm, A. J. M.; Van Den Brekel, M. W. M.; Hauptmann, M.; Begg, A. C.; Rasch, C. R. N. (24 March 2010). "HPV and high-risk gene expression profiles predict response to chemoradiotherapy in head and neck cancer, independent of clinical factors". Radiotherapy and Oncology. 95 (3): 365–370. doi:10.1016/j.radonc.2010.02.001. ISSN 1879-0887. PMID 20346528.
- Kato, Masanari G.; Ellis, Mark A.; Nguyen, Shaun A.; Day, Terry A. (February 2018). "Predictors of contralateral-bilateral nodal disease in oropharyngeal cancer: A National Cancer Data Base Study". Head & Neck. 40 (2): 338–348. doi:10.1002/hed.24964. PMID 28963823. S2CID 10627950.
- Lewis, James S; Carpenter, Danielle H; Thorstad, Wade L; Zhang, Qin; Haughey, Bruce H (24 June 2011). "Extracapsular extension is a poor predictor of disease recurrence in surgically treated oropharyngeal squamous cell carcinoma". Modern Pathology. 24 (11): 1413–1420. doi:10.1038/modpathol.2011.105. PMC 3925389. PMID 21701534.
- Licitra, Lisa; Perrone, Federica; Bossi, Paolo; et al. (20 December 2006). "High-Risk Human Papillomavirus Affects Prognosis in Patients With Surgically Treated Oropharyngeal Squamous Cell Carcinoma". Journal of Clinical Oncology. 24 (36): 5630–5636. doi:10.1200/JCO.2005.04.6136. PMID 17179101.
- Lowy, D.; Munger, K. (2010). "Prognostic Implications of HPV in Oropharyngeal Cancer". The New England Journal of Medicine (Editorial). 363 (1): 82–84. doi:10.1056/NEJMe1003607. PMID 20530315.
- Martel, María; Alemany, Laia; Taberna, Miren; Mena, Marisa; Tous, Sara; Bagué, Silvia; Castellsagué, Xavier; Quer, Miquel; León, Xavier (January 2017). "The role of HPV on the risk of second primary neoplasia in patients with oropharyngeal carcinoma". Oral Oncology. 64: 37–43. doi:10.1016/j.oraloncology.2016.11.011. PMID 28024722.
- Maxwell, J. H.; Kumar, B.; Feng, F. Y.; et al. (9 February 2010). "Tobacco Use in Human Papillomavirus-Positive Advanced Oropharynx Cancer Patients Related to Increased Risk of Distant Metastases and Tumor Recurrence". Clinical Cancer Research. 16 (4): 1226–1235. doi:10.1158/1078-0432.CCR-09-2350. PMC 2822887. PMID 20145161.
- Maxwell, Jessica H.; Ferris, Robert L.; Gooding, William; Cunningham, Diana; Mehta, Vikas; Kim, Seungwon; Myers, Eugene N.; Johnson, Jonas; Chiosea, Simion (September 2013). "Extracapsular spread in head and neck carcinoma: Impact of site and human papillomavirus status". Cancer. 119 (18): 3302–3308. CiteSeerX 10.1.1.663.564. doi:10.1002/cncr.28169. PMID 23797868. S2CID 32595866.
- Nguyen, Nam P.; Ly, Bevan Hong; Betz, Michael; Vinh-Hung, Vincent (18 June 2010). "Importance of Age as a Prognostic Factor for Tonsillar Carcinoma". Annals of Surgical Oncology. 17 (10): 2570–2577. doi:10.1245/s10434-010-1167-0. PMID 20559738. S2CID 8833627.
- O'Sullivan, Brian; Huang, Shao Hui; Siu, Lillian L.; et al. (10 February 2013). "Deintensification Candidate Subgroups in Human Papillomavirus–Related Oropharyngeal Cancer According to Minimal Risk of Distant Metastasis". Journal of Clinical Oncology. 31 (5): 543–550. doi:10.1200/JCO.2012.44.0164. PMID 23295795.
- Ragin, Camille C. R.; Taioli, Emanuela (15 October 2007). "Survival of squamous cell carcinoma of the head and neck in relation to human papillomavirus infection: Review and meta-analysis". International Journal of Cancer. 121 (8): 1813–1820. doi:10.1002/ijc.22851. PMID 17546592. S2CID 23657353.
- Rischin, Danny; Young, Richard J.; Fisher, Richard; et al. (20 September 2010). "Prognostic Significance of p16INK4A and Human Papillomavirus in Patients With Oropharyngeal Cancer Treated on TROG 02.02 Phase III Trial". Journal of Clinical Oncology. 28 (27): 4142–4148. doi:10.1200/JCO.2010.29.2904. PMC 2953971. PMID 20697079.
- Routman, David M.; Funk, Ryan K.; Tangsriwong, Kanograt; et al. (June 2017). "Relapse Rates With Surgery Alone in Human Papillomavirus–Related Intermediate- and High-Risk Group Oropharynx Squamous Cell Cancer: A Multi-Institutional Review". International Journal of Radiation Oncology, Biology, Physics. 99 (4): 938–946. doi:10.1016/j.ijrobp.2017.06.2453. PMID 28847412.
- Sinha, Parul; Lewis, James S.; Piccirillo, Jay F.; Kallogjeri, Dorina; Haughey, Bruce H. (15 July 2012). "Extracapsular spread and adjuvant therapy in human papillomavirus-related, p16-positive oropharyngeal carcinoma". Cancer. 118 (14): 3519–3530. doi:10.1002/cncr.26671. PMID 22086669. S2CID 28111538.
- Sinha, P.; Thorstad, W.T.; Nussenbaum, B.; Haughey, B.H.; Adkins, D.R.; Kallogjeri, D.; Lewis Jr., J.S. (January 2014). "Distant metastasis in p16-positive oropharyngeal squamous cell carcinoma: A critical analysis of patterns and outcomes". Oral Oncology. 50 (1): 45–51. doi:10.1016/j.oraloncology.2013.10.007. PMC 3942323. PMID 24211084.
- Sinha, Parul; Kallogjeri, Dorina; Gay, Hiram; Thorstad, Wade L.; Lewis, James S.; Chernock, Rebecca; Nussenbaum, Brian; Haughey, Bruce H. (May 2015). "High metastatic node number, not extracapsular spread or N-classification is a node-related prognosticator in transorally-resected, neck-dissected p16-positive oropharynx cancer". Oral Oncology. 51 (5): 514–520. doi:10.1016/j.oraloncology.2015.02.098. PMID 25771076.
- Trosman, Samuel J.; Koyfman, Shlomo A.; Ward, Matthew C.; et al. (1 May 2015). "Effect of Human Papillomavirus on Patterns of Distant Metastatic Failure in Oropharyngeal Squamous Cell Carcinoma Treated With Chemoradiotherapy". JAMA Otolaryngology–Head & Neck Surgery. 141 (5): 457–62. doi:10.1001/jamaoto.2015.136. PMID 25742025.
- Ward, M J; Thirdborough, S M; Mellows, T; et al. (29 October 2013). "Tumour-infiltrating lymphocytes predict for outcome in HPV-positive oropharyngeal cancer". British Journal of Cancer. 110 (2): 489–500. doi:10.1038/bjc.2013.639. PMC 3899750. PMID 24169344.

==== Epidemiology ====
- Anantharaman, Devasena; Muller, David C; Lagiou, Pagona; et al. (June 2016). "Combined effects of smoking and HPV16 in oropharyngeal cancer". International Journal of Epidemiology. 45 (3): 752–761. doi:10.1093/ije/dyw069. PMC 5841602. PMID 27197530.
- Chaturvedi, A.; Engels, E.; Anderson, W.; Gillison, M. (Feb 2008). "Incidence trends for human papillomavirus-related and -unrelated oral squamous cell carcinomas in the United States". Journal of Clinical Oncology. 26 (4): 612–619. doi:10.1200/JCO.2007.14.1713. PMID 18235120.
- Chaturvedi, Anil K.; Engels, Eric A.; Pfeiffer, Ruth M.; et al. (10 November 2011). "Human Papillomavirus and Rising Oropharyngeal Cancer Incidence in the United States". Journal of Clinical Oncology. 29 (32): 4294–4301. doi:10.1200/JCO.2011.36.4596. PMC 3221528. PMID 21969503.
- Chaturvedi, Anil K.; Anderson, William F.; Lortet-Tieulent, Joannie; Curado, Maria Paula; Ferlay, Jacques; Franceschi, Silvia; Rosenberg, Philip S.; Bray, Freddie; Gillison, Maura L. (20 December 2013). "Worldwide Trends in Incidence Rates for Oral Cavity and Oropharyngeal Cancers". Journal of Clinical Oncology. 31 (36): 4550–4559. doi:10.1200/JCO.2013.50.3870. PMC 3865341. PMID 24248688.
- Chenevert, J; Chiosea, S (January 2012). "Incidence of human papillomavirus in oropharyngeal squamous cell carcinomas: now and 50 years ago". Human Pathology. 43 (1): 17–22. doi:10.1016/j.humpath.2011.03.009. PMID 21777945.
- Cook, M.; Dawsey, S.; Freedman, N.; Inskip, P.; Wichner, S.; Quraishi, S.; Devesa, S.; McGlynn, K. (2009). "Sex disparities in cancer incidence by time period and age". Cancer Epidemiology, Biomarkers & Prevention. 18 (4): 1174–1182. doi:10.1158/1055-9965.EPI-08-1118. PMC 2793271. PMID 19293308.
- Dayyani, Farshid; Etzel, Carol J; Liu, Mei; Ho, Chung-Han; Lippman, Scott M; Tsao, Anne S (2010). "Meta-analysis of the impact of human papillomavirus (HPV) on cancer risk and overall survival in head and neck squamous cell carcinomas (HNSCC)". Head & Neck Oncology. 2 (1): 15. doi:10.1186/1758-3284-2-15. PMC 2908081. PMID 20587061.
- D'Souza, G.; Kreimer, A.; Viscidi, R.; Pawlita, M.; Fakhry, C.; Koch, W.; Westra, W.; Gillison, M. (May 2007). "Case-control study of human papillomavirus and oropharyngeal cancer". The New England Journal of Medicine. 356 (19): 1944–1956. doi:10.1056/NEJMoa065497. ISSN 0028-4793. PMID 17494927. S2CID 18819678.
- de Martel, Catherine; Ferlay, Jacques; Franceschi, Silvia; Vignat, Jérôme; Bray, Freddie; Forman, David; Plummer, Martyn (June 2012). "Global burden of cancers attributable to infections in 2008: a review and synthetic analysis". The Lancet Oncology. 13 (6): 607–615. doi:10.1016/S1470-2045(12)70137-7. PMID 22575588.
- de Martel, Catherine; Plummer, Martyn; Vignat, Jerome; Franceschi, Silvia (15 August 2017). "Worldwide burden of cancer attributable to HPV by site, country and HPV type". International Journal of Cancer. 141 (4): 664–670. doi:10.1002/ijc.30716. PMC 5520228. PMID 28369882.
- Ernster, J.; Sciotto, C.; O'Brien, M.; Finch, J.; Robinson, L.; Willson, T.; Mathews, M. (Dec 2007). "Rising incidence of oropharyngeal cancer and the role of oncogenic human papilloma virus". The Laryngoscope. 117 (12): 2115–2128. doi:10.1097/MLG.0b013e31813e5fbb. ISSN 0023-852X. PMID 17891052. S2CID 38017888.
- Forman, David; de Martel, Catherine; Lacey, Charles J.; et al. (November 2012). "Global Burden of Human Papillomavirus and Related Diseases". Vaccine. 30: F12–F23. doi:10.1016/j.vaccine.2012.07.055. PMID 23199955. S2CID 30694437.
- Gillison, Maura L.; Chaturvedi, Anil K.; Anderson, William F.; Fakhry, Carole (10 October 2015). "Epidemiology of Human Papillomavirus–Positive Head and Neck Squamous Cell Carcinoma". Journal of Clinical Oncology. 33 (29): 3235–3242. doi:10.1200/JCO.2015.61.6995. PMC 4979086. PMID 26351338.
- Habbous, Steven; Chu, Karen P.; Lau, Harold; et al. (13 August 2017). "Human papillomavirus in oropharyngeal cancer in Canada: analysis of 5 comprehensive cancer centres using multiple imputation". Canadian Medical Association Journal. 189 (32): E1030–E1040. doi:10.1503/cmaj.161379. PMC 5555753. PMID 28808115.
- Hammarstedt, L.; Lindquist, D.; Dahlstrand, H.; et al. (Dec 2006). "Human papillomavirus as a risk factor for the increase in incidence of tonsillar cancer". International Journal of Cancer. 119 (11): 2620–2623. doi:10.1002/ijc.22177. ISSN 0020-7136. PMID 16991119. S2CID 20541360.
- Heck, Julia E; Berthiller, Julien; Vaccarella, Salvatore; et al. (February 2010). "Sexual behaviours and the risk of head and neck cancers: a pooled analysis in the International Head and Neck Cancer Epidemiology (INHANCE) consortium". International Journal of Epidemiology. 39 (1): 166–181. doi:10.1093/ije/dyp350. PMC 2817092. PMID 20022926.
- Hemminki, K; Dong, C; Frisch, M (December 2000). "Tonsillar and other upper aerodigestive tract cancers among cervical cancer patients and their husbands". European Journal of Cancer Prevention. 9 (6): 433–437. doi:10.1097/00008469-200012000-00010. PMID 11201683. S2CID 10517792.
- Hong, Angela M.; Grulich, Andrew E.; Jones, Deanna; Lee, C. Soon; Garland, Suzanne M.; Dobbins, Timothy A.; Clark, Jonathan R.; Harnett, Gerald B.; Milross, Christopher G.; O'Brien, Christopher J.; Rose, Barbara R. (April 2010). "Squamous cell carcinoma of the oropharynx in Australian males induced by human papillomavirus vaccine targets". Vaccine. 28 (19): 3269–3272. doi:10.1016/j.vaccine.2010.02.098. PMID 20226244.
- Hong, Angela; Lee, C. Soon; Jones, Deanna; et al. (May 2016b). "Rising prevalence of human papillomavirus-related oropharyngeal cancer in Australia over the last 2 decades". Head & Neck. 38 (5): 743–750. doi:10.1002/hed.23942. PMID 25521312. S2CID 1974978.
- Hwang, Tzer-Zen; Hsiao, Jenn-Ren; Tsai, Chia-Rung; Chang, Jeffrey S. (15 July 2015). "Incidence trends of human papillomavirus-related head and neck cancer in Taiwan, 1995-2009". International Journal of Cancer. 137 (2): 395–408. doi:10.1002/ijc.29330. PMID 25395239. S2CID 20551422.
- Jemal, A.; Siegel, R.; Ward, E.; Hao, Y.; Xu, J.; Murray, T.; Thun, M. J. (28 January 2008). "Cancer Statistics, 2008". CA: A Cancer Journal for Clinicians. 58 (2): 71–96. doi:10.3322/CA.2007.0010. PMID 18287387. S2CID 43737426.
- Marur, S.; D'souza, G.; Westra, W. H.; Forastiere, A. A. (2010). "HPV-associated head and neck cancer: a virus-related cancer epidemic". The Lancet Oncology. 11 (8): 781–789. doi:10.1016/S1470-2045(10)70017-6. PMC 5242182. PMID 20451455.
- Näsman, A.; Attner, P.; Hammarstedt, L.; et al. (July 2009). "Incidence of human papillomavirus (HPV) positive tonsillar carcinoma in Stockholm, Sweden: an epidemic of viral-induced carcinoma?". International Journal of Cancer. 125 (2): 362–366. doi:10.1002/ijc.24339. PMID 19330833. S2CID 36268685.
- Salem, A. (2010). "Dismissing links between HPV and aggressive tongue cancer in young patients". Annals of Oncology. 21 (1): 13–17. doi:10.1093/annonc/mdp380. PMID 19825879.
- Schwartz, S. M.; Daling, J. R.; Madeleine, M. M.; et al. (4 November 1998). "Oral Cancer Risk in Relation to Sexual History and Evidence of Human Papillomavirus Infection". JNCI Journal of the National Cancer Institute. 90 (21): 1626–1636. doi:10.1093/jnci/90.21.1626. PMID 9811312.
- Siegel, Rebecca; Naishadham, Deepa; Jemal, Ahmedin (January 2013). "Cancer statistics, 2013". CA: A Cancer Journal for Clinicians. 63 (1): 11–30. doi:10.3322/caac.21166. PMID 23335087. S2CID 24926725.
- Siegel, Rebecca L.; Miller, Kimberly D.; Jemal, Ahmedin (January 2015). "Cancer statistics, 2015". CA: A Cancer Journal for Clinicians. 65 (1): 5–29. doi:10.3322/caac.21254. PMID 25559415. S2CID 10193624.
- Siegel, Rebecca L.; Miller, Kimberly D.; Jemal, Ahmedin (January 2017). "Cancer statistics, 2017". CA: A Cancer Journal for Clinicians. 67 (1): 7–30. doi:10.3322/caac.21387. PMID 28055103.
- Smith, E.; Ritchie, J.; Summersgill, K.; Klussmann, J.; Lee, J.; Wang, D.; Haugen, T.; Turek, L. (Feb 2004). "Age, sexual behavior and human papillomavirus infection in oral cavity and oropharyngeal cancers". International Journal of Cancer. 108 (5): 766–772. doi:10.1002/ijc.11633. ISSN 0020-7136. PMID 14696105. S2CID 25146008.
- Sturgis, E.; Cinciripini, P. (Oct 2007). "Trends in head and neck cancer incidence in relation to smoking prevalence: an emerging epidemic of human papillomavirus-associated cancers?". Cancer. 110 (7): 1429–1435. doi:10.1002/cncr.22963. ISSN 0008-543X. PMID 17724670. S2CID 20189903.
- Sturgis, EM; Ang, KK (1 June 2011). "The epidemic of HPV-associated oropharyngeal cancer is here: is it time to change our treatment paradigms?". Journal of the National Comprehensive Cancer Network. 9 (6): 665–73. doi:10.6004/jnccn.2011.0055. PMID 21636538.
- Tachezy, R (May 2005). "HPV and other risk factors of oral cavity/oropharyngeal cancer in the Czech Republic". Oral Diseases. 11 (3): 181–185. doi:10.1111/j.1601-0825.2005.01112.x. PMID 15888110.
- Tezal, Mine; Sullivan Nasca, Maureen; Stoler, Daniel L.; Melendy, Thomas; Hyland, Andrew; Smaldino, Philip J.; Rigual, Nestor R.; Loree, Thom R. (1 April 2009). "Chronic Periodontitis−Human Papillomavirus Synergy in Base of Tongue Cancers". Archives of Otolaryngology–Head & Neck Surgery. 135 (4): 391–6. doi:10.1001/archoto.2009.6. PMID 19380363.
- Tezal, M.; Sullivan, M. A.; Hyland, A.; et al. (10 September 2009). "Chronic Periodontitis and the Incidence of Head and Neck Squamous Cell Carcinoma". Cancer Epidemiology, Biomarkers & Prevention. 18 (9): 2406–2412. doi:10.1158/1055-9965.EPI-09-0334. PMID 19745222.
- Viens, Laura J.; Henley, S. Jane; Watson, Meg; Markowitz, Lauri E.; Thomas, Cheryll C.; Thompson, Trevor D.; Razzaghi, Hilda; Saraiya, Mona (8 July 2016). "Human Papillomavirus–Associated Cancers — United States, 2008–2012". MMWR. Morbidity and Mortality Weekly Report. 65 (26): 661–666. doi:10.15585/mmwr.mm6526a1. PMID 27387669.

=== Books and conference proceedings ===
- Bernier, Jacques, ed. (2016). Head and Neck Cancer: Multimodality Management. Springer International Publishing. ISBN 978-3-319-27601-4.
- Brierley, J.D.; Gospodarowicz, M.K.; Wittekind, Ch., eds. (2017). TNM classification of malignant tumours (8th ed.). Chichester, West Sussex, UK: Wiley-Blackwell. ISBN 978-1-4443-3241-4.
- Cardesa, Antonio; Slootweg, Pieter J.; Gale, Nina; Franchi, Alessandro, eds. (2017). Pathology of the Head and Neck (2nd ed.). Springer. ISBN 978-3-662-49672-5.
- Golusiński, Wojciech; Leemans, C. René; Dietz, Andreas, eds. (2017). HPV Infection in Head and Neck Cancer. Recent Results in Cancer Research. Vol. 206. Springer. ISBN 978-3-319-43580-0.
- DeVita, Vincent T.; Lawrence, Theodore S.; Rosenberg, Steven A., eds. (2008) [1982]. DeVita, Hellman, and Rosenberg's Cancer: Principles & Practice of Oncology (8th ed.). Philadelphia: Lippincott Williams & Wilkins. ISBN 978-0-7817-7207-5.
- Hayat, M. A., ed. (2010). Methods of Cancer Diagnosis, Therapy, and Prognosis: Volume 7 – General Overviews, Head and Neck Cancer and Thyroid Cancer. Springer Science & Business Media. ISBN 978-90-481-3186-0.
- Kerr, David J.; Haller, Daniel G.; van de Velde, Cornelis J.H.; Baumann, Michael, eds. (2016) [1995]. Oxford Textbook of Oncology (3rd ed.). Oxford University Press. ISBN 978-0-19-965610-3.
- Myers, Jeffrey N.; Sturgis, Erich M., eds. (2013). Oral Cavity and Oropharyngeal Cancer, An Issue of Otolaryngologic Clinics, E-Book. Elsevier Health Sciences. ISBN 978-0-323-18632-2.
- Olshan, Andrew F., ed. (2010). Epidemiology, Pathogenesis, and Prevention of Head and Neck Cancer. Springer Science & Business Media. ISBN 978-1-4419-1471-2.
- Sobin, L.H.; Gospodarowicz, M.K.; Wittekind, Ch., eds. (2010). TNM classification of malignant tumours (7th ed.). Chichester, West Sussex, UK: Wiley-Blackwell. ISBN 978-1-4443-3241-4.
- Standring, Susan, ed. (2015). Gray's Anatomy: The Anatomical Basis of Clinical Practice (41st ed.). Elsevier Health Sciences. ISBN 978-0-7020-6851-5., see also Gray's Anatomy

=== Chapters, monographs, reports and theses ===
- Bruni, L; Barrionuevo-Rosas, L; Albero, G; Serrano, B; Mena, M; Gómez, D; Muñoz, J; Bosch, FX; de Sanjosé, S (7 July 2017). Human Papillomavirus and Related Diseases in the World (PDF). HPVIC., in HPVIC (2017)
- Chaturvedi, Anil; Gillison, Maura L. (2010-03-04). Human Papillomavirus and Head and Neck Cancer. Springer. pp. 87–116. ISBN 978-1-4419-1471-2., in Olshan (2010)
- Chung, Christine H; Dietz, Andreas; Gregoire, Vincent; et al. (2016). Head and neck cancer. Oxford University Press. pp. 329–364. ISBN 978-0-19-965610-3., in Kerr et al (2016)
- Hammarstedt, Lalle (25 April 2008), Tonsillar Cancer – Incidence, Prevalence of HPV and Survival (PhD thesis), Stockholm: Department of Clinical Neuroscience, Karolinska Institutet, ISBN 978-91-7357-587-4, archived from the original on 15 August 2017
- McHanwell, Stephen (2015-08-07). Pharynx. Elsevier Health Sciences. pp. 571–585. ISBN 978-0-7020-6851-5., in Standring (2015)
- Helliwell, T; Woolgar, JA (1998). Standards and minimum datasets for reporting common cancers. Minimum dataset for head and neck histopathology reports. London: The Royal College of Pathologists.
- Johnson, Newell; Chaturvedi, Anil (2016). Global burden of oral cavity and pharyngeal cancers (PDF) (Conference white paper)., in GOCF (2016)
- Mehanna, H. "Update on De-intensification and Intensification Studies in HPV". In Golusiński, Leemans & Dietz (2017), pp. 251–256.. excerpt here
- Munck-Wikland, Eva; Hammarstedt, Lalle; Dahlstrand, Hanna (2010-04-07). Role of Human Papillomavirus in Tonsillar Cancer. Springer. pp. 271–283. ISBN 978-90-481-3186-0., in Hayat (2010) (additional extract here)
- IARC Working Group on the Evaluation of Carcinogenic Risks to Humans (1995). "Human papillomaviruses". IARC Monographs on the Evaluation of Carcinogenic Risks to Humans. 64: 1–378. PMC 5366848. PMID 16755705.
- IARC Working Group on the Evaluation of Carcinogenic Risks to Humans (2007). "Human papillomaviruses". IARC Monographs on the Evaluation of Carcinogenic Risks to Humans. 90: 1–636. PMC 4781057. PMID 18354839.
- IARC Working Group on the Evaluation of Carcinogenic Risks to Humans (2012). "Human Papilloviruses". Biological Agents. Vol. 100B. Lyon: International Agency for Research on Cancer. pp. 255–314. ISBN 978-92-832-1319-2.

=== Websites ===
- Bath, Charlotte (25 April 2017). "Deintensifiying Treatment of HPV-Positive Oropharyngeal Cancer Could Reduce Toxicity While Maintaining Function and Survival". ASCO Post (Report of 2016 Multidisciplinary Head & Neck Symposium). ASCO.
- Hunt, Jennifer L (21 March 2010). "Molecular Assessment of HPV in Patients with Head and Neck Tumors" (PDF). Association for Molecular Pathology. United States and Canadian Academy of Pathology. Archived from the original (PDF) on 16 July 2011.
- "Cancer of the Oral Cavity and Pharynx by Subsite" (PDF). SEER Cancer Statistics Review 1975–2007. Surveillance, Epidemiology, and End Results (SEER) Program. 15 April 2010.
- "The Pharynx". TeachMeAnatomy. TeachMe. 29 April 2017.
- Dubner, Sanford (19 June 2017). "Head and Neck Cancer – Resection and Neck Dissection: Relevant Anatomy". Medscape. WebMD.
- Joshi, Arjun S; Vashishta, Rishi; George, Philip E (18 November 2013). "Pharynx Anatomy". Medscape. WebMD.
- "Oropharyngeal Cancer Treatment". Head and neck Cancer – Patient version. National Institutes of Health – National Cancer Institute. December 2016. Archived from the original on 11 February 2021.
- PDQ Adult Treatment Editorial Board (28 March 2018). "Oropharyngeal Cancer Treatment (Adult) (PDQ®): Health Professional Version". Oropharyngeal Cancer Treatment (Adult) (PDQ®). National Institutes of Health – National Cancer Institute. PMID 26389168.
- "Oropharyngeal Cancer Treatment". emedicinehealth. WebMD. 1 August 2017.
- Is Oral Sex Safe? (Television production). England: BBC Three. 10 January 2011.
- "HPV Information Centre". Lyon: International Agency for Research on Cancer & Catalan Institute of Oncology.
- "The Global Oral Cancer Forum 2016" (Conference proceedings). Henry Schein Cares Foundation. 2017.
- "Cetuximab with radiation found to be inferior to standard treatment in HPV-positive oropharyngeal cancer". News releases. National Institutes of Health. 14 August 2018.

==== Treatment guidelines ====
- "Head and Neck Cancer Evidence-based Series (EBS) and Practice Guidelines (PG)". Evidence Based Guidelines. Cancer Care Ontario. 31 March 2017.
- "The Management of Head and Neck Cancer in Ontario. EBS 5-3". December 2009., in CCO (2017)
- "Routine HPV Testing in Head and Neck Squamous Cell Carcinoma. EBS 5-9". May 2013., in CCO (2017)
- "Head and Neck Cancers" (PDF). NCCN Guidelines 2.2018. National Comprehensive Cancer Network. 20 June 2018.
- "Head & Neck". Cancer Management Guidelines. British Columbia: BC Cancer Agency. 2017. Archived from the original on 24 August 2017.
