= Florence Pat Haseltine =

American scientist, novelist, and activist (born 1942)

- Born: August 17, 1942 (age 84); United States
- Education: University of California at Berkeley; Massachusetts Institute of Technology
- Known for: Obstetrics, gynecology, women's rights, gender bias
- Awards: American Woman's Medical Association Scientist Award; The Kilby International Laureates Award; Barbara Eck Menning Founder's Award; Alma Dea Morani, M.D. Renaissance Woman Award
- Scientific career
- Fields: Biophysics, reproductive endocrinology and infertility
- Workplaces: National Institutes of Health; Yale University; The University of Texas at Arlington
- Doctoral students: Denise Faustman

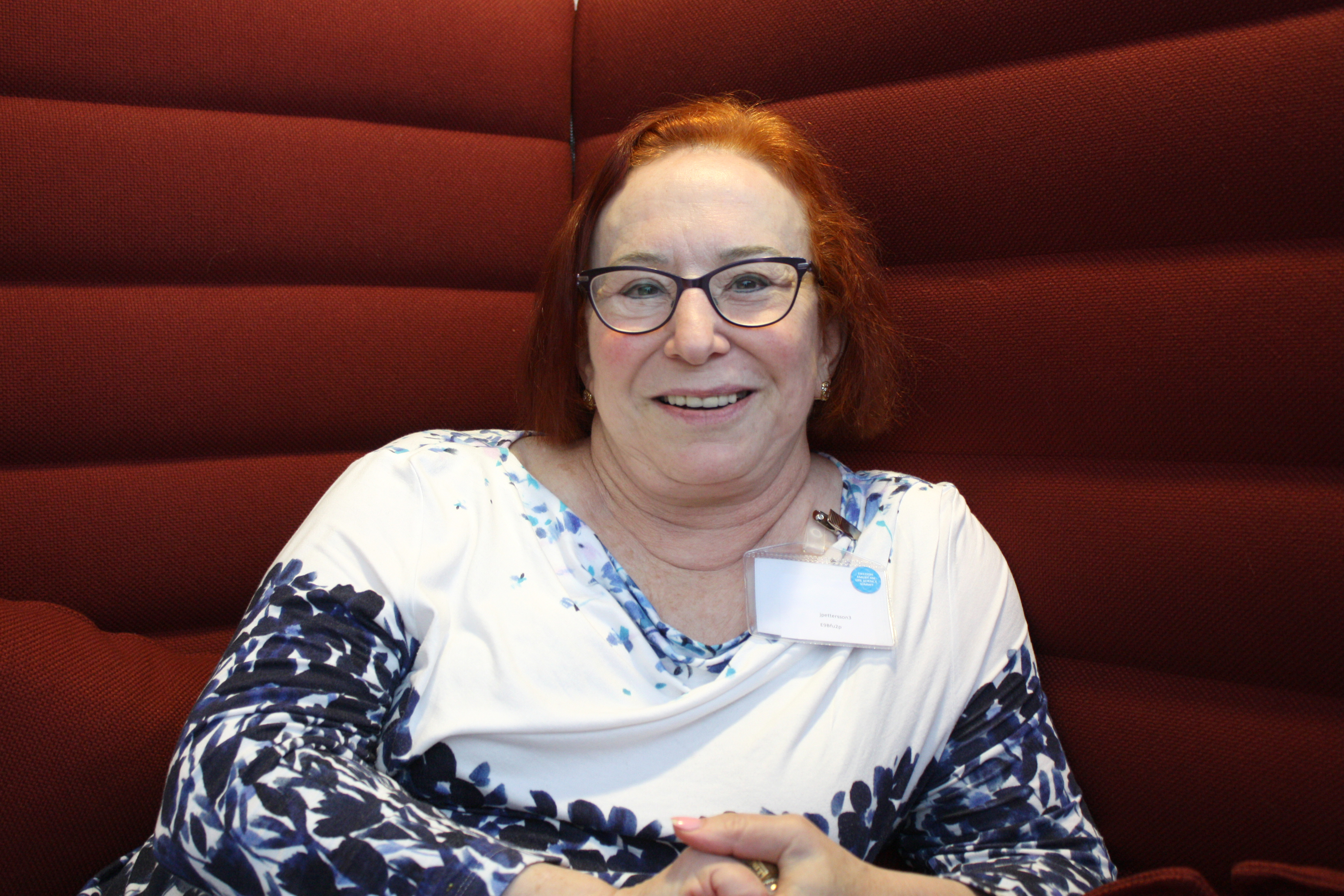
Florence Haseltine, 2017, at the SALSS conference in Stockholm, Sweden.

Florence Pat Haseltine (born 1942) is a U.S. physician, biophysicist, reproductive endocrinologist, journal editor, novelist, inventor, and advocate for women's health. An associate professor at Yale University, her work specializes in obstetrics and gynecology as well as women's rights and gender bias in medicine. While at Yale, Haseltine established the embryology laboratory, which was one of the early labs to have a successful IVF baby. The Microscope used in the laboratory is now in Historical Collections of the National Museum of Health and Medicine (Catalog number is M- 030.10091).

Haseltine is a Presidential Distinguished Professor of Nursing and the Jenkins Garrett Professor at The University of Texas at Arlington and serves as the medical director of the North Texas Genome Center where she managed the COVID-19 testing program.

== Education and career ==
Haseltine grew up in a family of scientists in China Lake, California. She and her siblings, William A. Haseltine, Eric Haseltine, and Susan Haseltine have all pursued careers in science and technology. She received her B.S. in physics/biophysics from University of California at Berkeley. She earned a Ph.D. in 1970 at the Massachusetts Institute of Technology and an M.D. in 1972 at the Albert Einstein College of Medicine. She completed her internship at the University of Pennsylvania at Philadelphia and did her residency in medicine in Obstetrics and Gynecology at the Boston Hospital for Women. She also served as assistant and associate professor in the Department of Ob/Gyn and Pediatrics at Yale University. Dr. Haseltine is a Presidential Distinguished Professor of Nursing at University of Texas at Arlington.

The gender bias she faced during her residency was described in a book which she co-wrote (with Yvonne Yaw) entitled Woman Doctor: "a ... novel that reveals the level of gender bias against women in the medical profession during the 1960s and 1970s."

From 1976 to 1985, she served as assistant and associate professor in the Department of Ob/Gyn and Pediatrics at Yale University. While at Yale, Haseltine established the embryology laboratory, which was one of the early labs to have a successful IVF baby. and the Microscope used is now in Historical Collections of the National Museum of Health and Medicine (Catalog number is M- 030.10091).

From 1985 to 2012 she was the director of the Center for Population Research at the National Institute of Child Health and Human Development at the National Institutes of Health. In 1990, she founded the Society for the Advancement of Women's Health Research with other women who, like herself, were advocates for women's health through their work in federal programs or on academic campuses. She was interviewed for the Oral History Collection on Women in Medicine, currently archived at Drexel University, College of Medicine, Legacy Collection. She was the founding editor-in-chief of the Journal of Women's Health since 1992, and she edited the comprehensive report Women's Health Research: A Medical and Policy Primer published by the Society for the Advancement of Women's Health Research 1997.

In 1995, Haseltine founded Haseltine Systems a company that designed products for people with disabilities. Haseltine Systems mission was to improve the mobility of people using wheelchairs. Dr. Haseltine holds two patents for the Haseltine Flyer, a portable protective container for wheelchairs to be used on airplanes, to allow wheelchair users to travel more easily. Haseltine also holds multiple patents related to Secure Internet Communications.

Following her retirement in 2012, she developed interactive websites and smart device websites that both inform the public about scientific and medical advances and also develop internal sites for networks of scientists. She developed an iPad application titled "Human Genome". The Human Genome App is designed so that a person can obtain information about a known gene or discover relationships between genes and diseases, syndromes, or traits. In her emerita status she worked with not-for-profit medical advocacy and research organizations, developing a public internet presence, e.g. the Global Virus Network.

In 2019, she returned to academia, currently serving as a Presidential Distinguished Professor of Nursing at University of Texas at Arlington.

== Awards and recognition ==
Haseltine has been recognized for her contributions in the field of women's health & reproductive science by her election to the National Academy of Medicine (NAM). She is cited as one of the 200 women physicians who "changed the face of medicine." a project of the National Library of Medicine (NLM). In 1993, she was the first recipient of the AACR Women in Cancer Research Keynote Lecture, now known as the AACR-Women in Cancer Research Charlotte Friend Lectureship. She is also a Weizmann Honored Scientist; a recipient of the American Woman's Medical Association Scientist Award in 1996 and the Lila A Wallis Award in 2014; a recipient of The Kilby International Laureates Award; a Health Hero honoree of the American Health For Women Magazine; a Prevention Magazine "Hall of Fame" honoree; Ladies' Home Journal "Champions of Women's Health" honoree; the Advocacy Award from Research America for the Society for Women's Health Research; received the Barbara Eck Menning Founder's Award. She also received the UNFPA Lifetime Achievement Award in October, 2012. In 2013 she was awarded the In 2023, she received the Presidential Award for Distinguished Service to Obstetrics and Gynecology from the American Gynecological and Obstetrical Society. In 2015 she was elected as a fellow to the National Academy of Inventors. Dr. Haseltine is also a Fellow of AAAS, AWIS, and AIMBE.

== Scientific sphere of influence ==
Haseltine was a mentor of Dr. Denise Faustman. Faustman specializes in diabetes mellitus type 1 (formerly called juvenile diabetes) and other autoimmune diseases.

Haseltine was also a mentor to Dr. Geoffrey M. Cooper, emeritus professor of Biology and Associate Dean of the Faculty at Boston University.

Haseltine and her husband Alan Chodos participated in the Student Action Coordinating Committee (SACC) and donated their papers and photographs to the National Museum of American History. Additional materials are achieved at Drexel University College of Medicine Legacy Center and at the Oral History Project from the Foundation for the History of Women in Medicine exhibit at the Countway Library and in the Yale University Oral Histories.

== Bibliography ==
- Haseltine, F. (2000). "Gender differences in addiction and recovery". Journal of Women's Health & Gender-Based Medicine. 9 (6): 579–583. doi:10.1089/15246090050118080. PMID 10957744.
- Haseltine, F. (1999). The changing face of women's health. Journal of Women's Health & Gender-Based Medicine, 8(10), 1219–1220.
- Haseltine, F. (1998). Learning: women's health. Journal of Women's Health, 7(8), 935.
- Haseltine, F. P. (2002). "Maintaining Fairness: Who Gets Funded at NIH, and Is the Process Fair?". Journal of Women's Health & Gender-Based Medicine. 11 (7): 569–570. doi:10.1089/152460902760360504. PMID 12396888.
- Haseltine, F. P. (1999, May). Redressing the Future. Journal of Women's Health & Gender-Based Medicine. p. 429.
- Haseltine, F. P. (2000). "Cloning and the Politics of Women's Health". Journal of Women's Health & Gender-Based Medicine. 9 (3): 211. doi:10.1089/152460900318407. PMID 10787218.
- Haseltine, F. P. (1998, October). Learning: Women's Health. Journal of Women's Health. p. 935.
- Haseltine, F. P. (1997). "New Ways of Making Babies: The case of egg donation". New England Journal of Medicine. 336 (12): 884. doi:10.1056/NEJM199703203361221.

== Personal life ==
Haseltine is married with two daughters.
