= Woman doctor =

Woman doctor or woman doctors may refer to:

- Women in medicine
- A doctor specialising in women's health

== Media ==
- Woman Doctor, a 1939 American film
- Woman Doctor, a 1976 book by Florence Pat Haseltine
- Woman Doctors, a 1984 German film
- Woman Doctor (TV series), a 1999 Japanese television series starring Miki Nakatani
