= Society for Women's Health Research =

- Abbreviation: SWHR
- Founded: 1990
- Founder: Florence Pat Haseltine
- Location: Washington, D.C.
- Website: swhr.org

The Society for Women's Health Research (SWHR) is a national non-profit organization based in Washington, D.C. SWHR is the thought leader in research on biological sex differences in disease and is dedicated to transforming women's health through science, advocacy, and education.

SWHR's mission is to advance women’s health through science, policy, and education while promoting research on sex differences to optimize women’s health. SWHR's vision is to make women's health mainstream.

Founded in 1990 by Florence Haseltine, PhD, MD, SWHR aims to bring national attention to the need for the appropriate inclusion of women and historically underrepresented minority populations in major medical research studies and the need for more information about diseases and conditions affecting women exclusively, predominantly, or differently than men. It also promotes the analysis of research data for sex, racial, and ethnic differences; and informs women, health care providers, and policy makers about contemporary women's health issues through media outreach, briefings, conferences, and special events.

As a result of SWHR's work, women are now regularly included in medical research and clinical trials; scientists are researching the ways in which health conditions and diseases affect men and women differently and why. Through SWHR's use of evidence-based research and multi-pronged policy and public education efforts, as well as the involvement of health care providers and policy makers dedicated to improving women's health, sex differences has become a national priority.

== History ==
SWHR was founded by Dr. Florence Haseltine as the Society for the Advancement of Women's Health Research in 1990. When Dr. Haseltine began working at the National Institutes of Health (NIH), she was told that her "role was to champion the field of obstetrics and gynecology," which at the time were under-represented in research. In 1985, NIH lacked sufficient in-house expertise and funding for academic scientists. When her friend, Congresswoman Rosa DeLauro, developed ovarian cancer, Dr. Haseltine seized the opportunity to promote the need for more research into conditions affecting women.

In the spring of 1989, Dr. Haseltine gathered friends and colleagues from medical and scientific organizations across the country to address this critical issue. They congregated at the American College of Obstetricians and Gynecologists (ACOG) and agreed on the need not only for more gynecological research at NIH but also for research regarding women's health in general. This meeting gave rise to SWHR.

In 1990, due to biases in biomedical research, the health of American women was at risk. SWHR's first Board of Directors made it their priority to confront this injustice. They worked with the Congressional Caucus for Women's Issues, its Executive Director Leslie Primer, and Congressman Henry Waxman (D-CA) to persuade the General Accounting Office (GAO; now the Government Accountability Office) to address the issue. They recommended that GAO evaluate NIH's policies and practices regarding the inclusion of women and minorities in clinical trials.

SWHR ensured that its dedicated leadership included a diverse group of health care providers and others concerned with research and health care equity, to provide a range of perspectives. Included in the initial gathering at ACOG and later on the first SWHR Board were physicians and researchers specializing in cardiology, mental health, and obstetrics-gynecology, as well as nurses, lawyers, and public policy advocates involved and interested in women's health. In 1993, SWHR opened its official headquarters in Washington, D.C., and hired its first professional staff. Phyllis Greenberger, MSW, was selected as the first executive director.

The GAO audit was successfully released at an NIH re-authorization hearing in June 1990. It concluded that the NIH policy of 1986, which encouraged the inclusion of women in clinical trials, had been poorly communicated and misunderstood within NIH and the research community at large. Additionally, it was applied inconsistently across Institutes and was only applied to extramural research (research conducted outside NIH). The GAO report concluded that there was "…no readily accessible source of data on the demographics of NIH study populations." This made it impossible to determine if NIH was enforcing its own recommendations.

== Activities ==
SWHR maintains three programmatic areas to accomplish its mission:

- Scientific
- Policy
- Education

=== Science ===
SWHR is elevating the collective understanding of health disparities facing women and how biological sex, gender, and hormones affect health across the lifespan. SWHR often convenes working groups for each of its programs and hosts scientific roundtables throughout the year to encourage dialogue about research, treatment, access, and education across women’s health areas. SWHR established a series of networks to foster interdisciplinary insights on women’s health and biological sex differences; these networks have evolved throughout SWHR’s decades of work. SWHR’s current networks are in the following areas:

- Autoimmune
- Eye Health
- Gynecologic Health
- Healthy Aging
- Infectious Diseases
- Liver Health
- Maternal Health
- Pain
- Sleep
- Technology Innovations

Past networks included the SWHR Network on Cardiovascular Disease; the Interdisciplinary Network on Metabolism; the Interdisciplinary Network on Musculoskeletal Health; the Interdisciplinary Network on Sex, Gender, Drugs, and the Brain; and the Interdisciplinary Network on Urological Health in Women; among others.

Some notable moments of SWHR’s Science work include the following:

In 2006, SWHR hosted the "Society for Women's Health Research Medtronic Prize for Scientific Contributions to Women's Health," an annual $75,000 prize which recognized a woman scientist or engineer for her contributions to women's health and encourages women to research issues uniquely related to women's health. This prize was active from 2006 to 2013.

In 2006, SWHR created the Organization for the Study of Sex Differences (OSSD), a scientific membership society to enhance the knowledge of sex and gender differences by facilitating interdisciplinary communication and collaboration among scientists and clinicians of diverse backgrounds.

In 2006, SWHR began administering the RAISE Project, which focused on increasing the status of professional women through enhanced recognition of their achievements in science, technology, engineering, medicine and mathematics. The RAISE Project brought together awards from all different areas of STEM & medicine. It was the only project at the time that listed over 1,950 awards as well the winners and broke down the distribution between men and women. Over 46,000 different recipients were identified when the RAISE Project was active. Some individuals are cited over 30 different times. The RAISE Project data was gathered by systematically searching the websites for posted awards. Data collection began in 2005 and shows award listings of scientific societies and relevant professional organizations starting from 1981. Data for the number of women and men in specific fields was obtained from publications of the National Science Foundation for STEM and the Association of American Medical Colleges. The RAISE Project is no longer active.

=== Policy ===
Throughout the year, SWHR champions policies that promote women’s health. SWHR is often called upon to offer expert testimony before Congress and to provide guidance on legislative and regulatory matters on women's health.

In 2021, SWHR published its first comprehensive women’s health policy agenda. SWHR continues to publish broad policy agendas as well as issue-specific policy agendas to outline SWHR’s legislative and regulatory priorities for women’s health and sex differences research.

In 2026, members of the SWHR, alongside their coalitions, welcomed the announcement of another official program in NIH dedicated to women's health with an emphasis on clinical trials which was spearheaded by Melania Trump.

=== Coalitions ===
SWHR serves as the administrative home for two coalitions:

- The Coalition to Advance Maternal Therapeutics (CAMT) was launched in 2014 with the goal of better understanding the safety and efficacy of prescription drugs, therapeutics, and vaccines used during pregnancy and breastfeeding.
- The Friends of the Office of Research on Women’s Health (Friends of ORWH) is a coalition of organizations that support the important work of the NIH’s Office of Research on Women’s Health.

=== Education ===
SWHR drives the national conversation on women’s health and sex differences research. SWHR runs numerous campaigns, conferences, and media briefings to educate the public on women's health issues. SWHR also publishes a monthly e-newsletter and shares the latest information on social media to keep the public informed about news relevant to women's health and biological sex differences.

SWHR's website features information on conditions that affect women predominantly or differently than men and promotes the inclusion of women and minorities in clinical trials by educating the public on how to participate in research and advocate for themselves as a patient, caregiver, or friend.

In 2006, SWHR published its first book for consumers, The Savvy Woman Patient: How and Why Sex Differences Impact Your Health. This consumer guide informed women about health conditions and treatments that are unique to women and focuses on how women's health differs from men's.

In 2014, SWHR released a national survey of 3,500 women to better understand women's habits and perceptions around breast cancer screening and mammograms, including the motivating factors, obstacles and barriers, emotional impact, and expectations for future testing.

In 2023, SWHR launched a national “Read My Lips” campaign aimed at educating women and their communities about their heart health care options, heart disease risks, and the connection between heart disease and lipids/high cholesterol.

In 2024, SWHR release a national menopause study of over 900 participants, titled “Employee Perspectives and Challenges Concerning the Transition of Menopause (EMPACT Menopause) Study,” which aimed to better understand the workplace experiences of individuals who have entered or completed the menopause transition, as well as their coworkers and employers.

=== Publications ===
The Journal of Women's Health, launched in 1992, is the official journal of SWHR.

SWHR helped to launch the Organization for the Study of Sex Differences (OSSD)'s Biology of Sex Differences Journal in 2010.

== Goals ==
In 2020, the Society for Women's Health Research celebrated its 30th anniversary, and at the time reflected on its history by publishing a timeline of important moments in time for the Society and women’s health research at large. In 2025, the Society celebrated its 35th anniversary. Each year, the Society looks ahead to challenges facing the country within health care, women’s health, and sex differences research. SWHR strives to ensure that women's health remains a high priority on the national agenda and that biological sex differences become more widely recognized as vital to health care treatment options. SWHR will continue to identify the gaps in health care and research that still exist for women as patient, caregivers, and members of the health care workforce, and work to close these gaps.

Both the size of staff and volunteers have grown over time to assist in these efforts. As of 2025, SWHR staff includes 10 full-time members, and its interdisciplinary network includes over 350 working group members.

SWHR staff relies on network members, other women’s health experts, contributing authors of resources and white papers, presenters from past SWHR events, as well as its partners at the Organization for the Study of Sex Differences (OSSD) for the medical and technical knowledge that undergirds all its science programs, educational outreach, and advocacy efforts.

SWHR will continue to partner with the widest possible range of health care providers, policymakers, researchers, and advocates to gather evidence-based information and then communicate it as appropriate to Congress, the scientific and clinical community, and the public.
