= CA (journal) =

Bimonthly medical journal

CA: A Cancer Journal for Clinicians
- Discipline: Oncology
- Language: English
- Edited by: Don S. Dizon

Publication details
- History: 1950–present
- Publisher: Wiley-Blackwell for the American Cancer Society
- Frequency: Bimonthly
- Open access: Yes
- Impact factor: 254.7 (2022)

Standard abbreviations
- ISO 4: CA: Cancer J. Clin.

Indexing
- CODEN: CAMCAM
- ISSN: 0007-9235 (print); 1542-4863 (web)
- LCCN: 55030061
- OCLC no.: 1044790

Links
- Journal homepage; Online access; Online archive

CA: A Cancer Journal for Clinicians is a bimonthly peer-reviewed medical journal published for the American Cancer Society by Wiley-Blackwell. The journal was established in 1950 and covers aspects of cancer research on diagnosis, therapy, and prevention. The editor-in-chief is Don S. Dizon.

== Abstracting and indexing ==
The journal is abstracted and indexed in:

- CINAHL
- Current Contents/Clinical Medicine
- EMBASE
- MEDLINE
- ProQuest
- Science Citation Index
- Scopus
- VINITI

== Journal Rankings ==
The following table provides an overview of the latest rankings of CA: A Cancer Journal for Clinicians across major scientific indexing databases, highlighting its top position in multiple subject areas.

Journal Ranking Summary (2023)
Source	Category	Rank	Percentile	Quartile
Scopus	Oncology in Medicine	1/404	99.75	Q1
Scopus	Hematology in Medicine	1/137	99.27	Q1
IF (Web of Science)	Oncology	1/322	99.80	Q1
JCI (Web of Science)	Oncology	1/322	99.69	Q1

According to the Journal Citation Reports, the journal has a 2022 impact factor of 254.7, ranking it first among all journals in the database.

The journal publishes a mix of comprehensive review articles, clinical guidelines, statistical reports, and other educational content aimed at informing cancer care professionals about advances in diagnosis, treatment, and prevention.
