= Denise Faustman =

American immunologist

Denise Louise Faustman
- Born: Royal Oak, Michigan
- Education: University of Michigan; Washington University in St. Louis
- Known for: Type 1 diabetes reversal trials, mainly
- Medical career
- Field: Immunology
- Institutions: Harvard University; Massachusetts General Hospital
- Website: https://www.faustmanlab.org/

Denise Louise Faustman is an American physician and medical researcher. An associate professor of medicine at Harvard University and director of the Immunobiology Laboratory at Massachusetts General Hospital, her work specializes in diabetes mellitus type 1 (formerly called juvenile diabetes) and other autoimmune diseases. She has worked at Massachusetts General Hospital in Boston since 1985.

== Education and career ==
Faustman was born in Royal Oak, Michigan. In 1978, she received her BS in zoology and chemistry from the University of Michigan. She earned a PhD in transplantation immunology in 1982 and an MD in 1985 from the Washington University School of Medicine in St. Louis, Missouri. She did her internship and residency in medicine at Massachusetts General Hospital.

== Research ==
Faustman's current research is based on the observation that autoreactive T cells (T cells that mistakenly attack the body's own cells and tissues) are more sensitive than normal T cells to the effects of TNF-alpha (TNF-α), a cytokine that influences the immune system. Under some conditions, TNF-α causes T cells to undergo apoptosis, or programmed cell death. Faustman's hypothesis is that certain autoimmune diseases can be treated by stimulating TNF-α to trigger apoptosis in autoimmune T cells.

Prior to entering human clinical trials, Faustman's approach was tested in non-obese diabetic mice (NOD mice), a strain of mice that spontaneously develops type 1 diabetes. Injecting the mice with a common inflammatory agent that increases the production of TNF-α, called complete Freund's adjuvant (CFA), and a preparation of spleen cells reversed type 1 diabetes in mice with end-stage disease and allowed the beta islet cells to regenerate.

Faustman hypothesized that this regeneration may be attributed in part to the re-differentiation of the spleen cells – that although the splenic stem cells were not obligatory for regeneration to occur, these cells could hasten regeneration. The source of islet cell regeneration is debated. Faustman's team was the first to document type 1 diabetes reversal in mice and in a subsequent phase I trial demonstrated successful human clinical results who had received the BCG vaccination. Researchers from three laboratories funded by the Juvenile Diabetes Research Foundation confirmed that Dr. Faustman's protocol can successfully reverse type 1 diabetes in end-stage mice; however, they did not find that the splenic cells played a role and suggested that the source of islet cell regeneration was proliferation of existing pancreatic islet cells. A research group led by a researcher from the U.S. National Institutes of Health (NIH) replicated Faustman's work in mice with type 1 diabetes.

=== Bacillus Calmette-Guerin vaccine ===
Former Chrysler chairman Lee Iacocca, whose wife died of type 1 diabetes complications and who has declared a desire to see the disease cured in his lifetime, is a patron of her work. The Iacocca Foundation helped raise the $11.5 million needed to support a Phase I human clinical trial (for safety) at Massachusetts General Hospital to test vaccination with Bacillus Calmette-Guerin (BCG), a weakened strain of bacteria that is used in the prevention of tuberculosis and in the treatment of bladder tumors and bladder cancer, as a potential treatment for advanced type 1 diabetes. Like CFA in the mouse (not approved for use in humans), BCG induces TNF-α production in humans. In some human trials, BCG was not found to prevent type 1 diabetes, or lead to type 1 diabetes remission in those who are newly diagnosed, although one study from Israel showed disease remission in newly diagnosed type 1 diabetes, and an observational study from Turkey suggested that multiple doses of the BCG vaccine in childhood may protect against the development of type 1 diabetes. Faustman hypothesizes that the optimal dose of BCG was not utilized in previous trials. Faustman hypothesizes that BCG could induce a permanent gene expression that restores regulatory T cells (Tregs), helping to prevent the immune system attack which characterizes type 1 diabetes.

=== Diabetes Clinical trials ===
Faustman and co-workers published efficacy data from the Phase I trial NCT00607230 in 2012. In the double-blind, placebo-controlled proof-of-concept study, six participants with long-term (mean duration of disease 15 years) type 1 diabetes were randomized to repeated BCG vaccinations (n=3) or placebo (n=3). The participants were matched to control subjects without diabetes (n=6) and also compared to reference subjects with and without the disease. Blood samples were monitored weekly for 20 weeks. Two of the three BCG-treated participants experienced a transient but statistically significant rise in C-peptide levels compared to reference subjects. Participants who received BCG vaccination also experienced a transient increase in the number of circulating dead autoreactive T cells against insulin. One participant who was randomized to the placebo arm also had similar rises in C-peptide and dead autoreactive T cells after unexpectedly developing an acute infection with the Epstein-Barr virus; it, like the BCG vaccination, is known to induce TNF. Faustman et al. concluded that BCG treatment or EBV infection transiently modified the autoimmunity that underlies advanced type 1 diabetes.

In 2018, Faustman and colleagues published long-term follow-up data from participants in the original Phase I BCG vaccination trial. The study reported that three years after receiving two doses of the Bacillus Calmette–Guérin (BCG) vaccine administered four weeks apart, participants with longstanding type 1 diabetes demonstrated reductions in HbA1c levels to near-normal ranges. These improvements were reported to persist for an additional five years. The study also proposed that the observed blood sugar improvements were associated with a novel metabolic mechanism involving increased cellular glucose utilization through induced aerobic glycolysis.

In 2026 Faustman and colleagues presented long term follow up of the Phase II clinical trial (NCT02081326) testing immunotherapy with multi-dose bacillus Calmette-Guérin (BCG) at the Scientific Session of the American Diabetes Association (ADA) including the full suite of diabetes biomarkers: including data on HbA1c, insulin use, C-peptide and time with normoglycemia. This 150-subject trial (100 BCG/50 placebo) included eight-year follow up of adults with juvenile-onset type 1 diabetes (T1D) as well as data on an exploratory group of adults with latent autoimmune diabetes in adults (LADA). All subjects were given a total of six BCG shots over five years. The results presented at the ADA meeting are also the first from a large, placebo-controlled clinical trial on BCG’s mechanisms of innate immunity and metabolic reprogramming that the Immunobiology Lab and colleagues around the world have been working on for many years.

The Phase II clinical trial of BCG presented at the ADA meeting showed that BCG had significant efficacy in positively changing the primary biomarkers in longstanding juvenile-onset T1D. All of the patients in the Phase II trial were adults who had been diagnosed with type 1 diabetes as juveniles (< 21 years of age) and had been living with type 1 diabetes for at least 2 years. Many patients had type 1 diabetes for over a decade at the time of enrollment. All subjects received six doses of BCG or placebo over the course of five years (two doses in Year 1; one dose in each subsequent year). The primary outcome of the trial was a reduction in HbA1c. Secondary outcomes of the trial included insulin use, time with normoglycemia (blood sugar in the range of 70-99mg/dL), autoantibody levels and stimulated C-peptide secretion. BCG reduced mean HbA1c levels, both statistically and at a clinically meaningful level. There was a statistically significant reduction in insulin use in the BCG-treated group, and continuous glucose monitor (CGM) data showed up to a 183.7% improvement over baseline in time spent in normoglycemia, with no increased episodes of hypoglycemia. Many patients in the trial were able to normalize their blood sugar levels and reduce insulin use.

As part of the Phase II clinical trial MGB enrolled subjects with LADA as an Exploratory Outcome. Individuals with LADA differ from those with juvenile-onset T1D in their older age of diabetes onset, a slower decline in C-peptide and lack of the glycolysis defects seen in T1D. Unlike the subjects enrolled with juvenile-onset T1D in the Phase II trial, most LADA subjects had remaining C-peptide and autoantibodies at enrollment. As demonstrated previously, the LADA group did not see a lowering in HbA1c with BCG treatment. This was predicted as LADA lack the underlying aerobic glycolysis defects seen in juvenile-onset diabetics, a clinical feature of only new onset T1D and a previously published open label LADA trial did not observe glucose improvement. BCG does, however, appear to preserve pancreas function with the stable induction of Treg cells. LADA subjects who received BCG did demonstrate the prevention of insulin resistance, preservation of C-peptide, restoration of stimulated C-peptide and a decrease in insulin use. Consistent with BCG’s ability to possibly slow autoimmunity BCG treated LADA subjects showed decreased levels of diabetes-associated autoantibodies in only the BCG treated group. The combined halt of progression of further C-peptide loss and the lowering of autoantibodies is consistent with BCG significantly slowing and possible pausing the progression of autoimmunity in LADA.

The Phase II study showed that multi-dose BCG potentially impacts autoimmune diabetes in two different ways depending on the etiology of the disease. For adults diagnosed as children, BCG appears to correct underlying aerobic lymphoid metabolic defects and improve blood sugar control through a shift from high oxidative phosphorylation to aerobic glycolysis. For those with LADA who retain some pancreatic function, BCG appears to reprogram the immune dysfunction associated with the destruction of the pancreas. Currently, MGB is testing BCG in children with type 1 diabetes who could potentially benefit from both mechanisms and experience a functional reversal of their diabetes. Both pediatric trials NCT02081326 and NCT05180591 are fully enrolled.

=== Other BCG Trials ===
In 2022 and 2024 MGH published results suggesting that BCG vaccination could protect type 1 diabetics from infection and symptoms of COVID-19. In 2023 and 2026 MGH published observation and clinical trial data may remodel the human brain’s immune environment and protect from the development of Alzheimer's disease.

=== TNF Superfamily Antibodies ===
The Faustman Lab has made several key discoveries related to the discovery and function of antibodies to the TNF Superfamily which led to the development of novel therapeutic candidates in oncology and autoimmunity.

== Partial bibliography ==
- Kuhtreiber WM, Washer SL, Hsu E, Zhao M, Reinhold P 3rd, Burger D, Zheng H, Faustman DL, et al. (2015). "Low levels of C-peptide have clinical significance for established Type 1 diabetes". Diabetic Medicine. 32 (10): 1346–53. doi:10.1111/dme.12850. PMC 4578991. PMID 26172028.
- Faustman DL, Wang L, Okubo Y, Burger D, Ban L, et al. (2012). "Proof-of-concept, randomized, controlled clinical trial of bacillus-Calmette-Guerin for treatment of long-term type 1 diabetes". PLOS ONE. 7 (8) e41756. Bibcode:2012PLoSO...741756F. doi:10.1371/journal.pone.0041756. PMC 3414482. PMID 22905105.
- Wang L, Lovejoy NF, Faustman DL (2012). "Persistence of prolonged C-peptide production in type 1 diabetes as measured with an ultrasensitive C-peptide assay". Diabetes Care. 35 (3): 465–70. doi:10.2337/dc11-1236. PMC 3322715. PMID 22355018.
- Burger DE, Wang L, Ban L, Okubo Y, Kühtreiber WM, Leichliter AK, Faustman DL (2011). "Novel automated blood separations validate whole cell biomarkers". PLOS ONE. 6 (7) e22430. Bibcode:2011PLoSO...622430B. doi:10.1371/journal.pone.0022430. PMC 3142167. PMID 21799852.
- Ban L, Zhang J, Wang L, Kuhtreiber W, Burger D, Faustman DL (2008). "Selective death of autoreactive T cells in human diabetes by TNF or TNF receptor 2 agonism". Proc Natl Acad Sci U S A. 105 (36): 13644–9. Bibcode:2008PNAS..10513644B. doi:10.1073/pnas.0803429105. PMC 2533243. PMID 18755894.
- Kuhtreiber WM, Kodama S, Burger DE, Dale EA, Faustman DL (2005). "Methods to characterize lymphoid apoptosis in a murine model of autoreactivity". J Immunol Methods. 306 (1–2): 137–50. doi:10.1016/j.jim.2005.08.008. PMID 16242708.
- Kodama S, Davis M, Faustman DL (2005). "The therapeutic potential of tumor necrosis factor for autoimmune disease: a mechanistically based hypothesis". Cell Mol Life Sci. 62 (16): 1850–62. doi:10.1007/s00018-005-5022-6. PMC 11138375. PMID 15968469. S2CID 22945347.
- Kodama S, Faustman DL (2004). "Routes to regenerating islet cells: stem cells and other biological therapies for type 1 diabetes". Pediatr Diabetes. 5 (Suppl 2): 38–44. doi:10.1111/j.1399-543X.2004.00078.x. PMID 15601373. S2CID 43684761.
- Ryu S, Kodama S, Ryu K, Schoenfeld DA, Faustman DL (2001). "Reversal of established autoimmune diabetes by restoration of endogenous beta cell function". J Clin Invest. 108 (1): 63–72. doi:10.1172/JCI12335. PMC 209340. PMID 11435458.
- Kodama S, Kuhtreiber W, Fujimura S, Dale EA, Faustman DL (2003). "Islet regeneration during the reversal of autoimmune diabetes in NOD mice". Science. 302 (5648): 1223–7. Bibcode:2003Sci...302.1223K. doi:10.1126/science.1088949. PMID 14615542. S2CID 897696.
