= Journal of Women's Health =

- Discipline: Women's health
- Language: English
- Edited by: Susan G. Kornstein

Publication details
- History: 1992–present
- Publisher: Mary Ann Liebert
- Frequency: Monthly
- Impact factor: 2.322 (2016)

Standard abbreviations
- ISO 4: J. Women's Health (Larchmt.)
- NLM: J Womens Health (Larchmt)

Indexing
- CODEN: JWHOAQ
- ISSN: 1540-9996 (print); 1931-843X (web)
- LCCN: 2002213698
- OCLC no.: 50229847

Links
- Journal homepage; Online archive

The Journal of Women's Health is a monthly peer-reviewed healthcare journal focusing on women's health care, including advancements in diagnostic procedures, therapeutic protocols for the management of diseases, and research in gender-based biology that impacts patient care and treatment. The journal was established in 1992 and is published by Mary Ann Liebert, Inc. It is the official journal of the Academy of Women's Health and the American Medical Women's Association. Its editor-in-chief is Susan G. Kornstein (Virginia Commonwealth University).

== Abstracting and indexing ==
The journal is abstracted and indexed in:

- Index Medicus/MEDLINE/PubMed
- Current Contents/Clinical Medicine
- Current Contents/Social & Behavioral Sciences
- Science Citation Index
- Social Sciences Citation Index
- Prous Science Integrity
- Embase/Excerpta Medica
- Scopus
- CINAHL
- PsycINFO
- CAB Abstracts
- Global Health

According to Journal Citation Reports, the journal has a 201 impact factor of 2.322, ranking it 3rd out of 41 journals in the category "Women's Studies".

== See also ==
- List of women's studies journals
