= Prous Science =

Health science publishing company

- Industry: Health Science Publishing
- Founded: 1965; 61 years ago
- Defunct: 2007
- Fate: Acquired by Thomson Reuters
- Headquarters: Barcelona, Catalonia, Spain
- Subsidiaries: Prous Institute for Biomedical Research

Prous Science was an international health science publishing company, established in 1965 and headquartered in Barcelona, Catalonia, Spain. The company was acquired by Thomson Reuters in 2007.

The Prous Institute for Biomedical Research was founded in 2000 by Dr Josep Prous Jr as a spinoff biotech company of Prous Science. Dr. J.R. Prous was the CEO and president of Prous Science.Its head offices are located in Barcelona and it has subsidiaries in Philadelphia (United States), Buenos Aires (Argentina) and Tokyo (Japan). Its research is based on the use of datamining, statistical analysis and chemoinformatic techniques, a recent and innovative international concept registered under the name "druginformatics". These techniques are complemented by laboratory methods from combinatorial chemistry, molecular biology and functional genomics.

== Science ==
The 'Prous Scientific Integrity' data portal was launched in 2001. In 2008, Prous pharmacology and drug discovery content was made available through Thomson Reuters services.

== See also ==
- Cheminformatics
