= Women's health =

Broad medical subject

Women's health is an example of population health, where health is defined by the World Health Organization (WHO) as "a state of complete physical, mental and social well-being and not merely the absence of disease or infirmity". Often treated as simply women's reproductive health, many groups argue for a broader definition pertaining to the overall health of women, better expressed as "The health of women". These differences are further exacerbated in developing countries where women, whose health includes both their risks and experiences, are further disadvantaged.

While the rates of the leading causes of death, cardiovascular disease, cancer and lung disease, are similar in women and men, women have different experiences. Lung cancer has overtaken all other types of cancer as the leading cause of cancer related death in women, followed by breast cancer, colorectal, ovarian, uterine and cervical cancers. While smoking is the major cause of lung cancer, amongst nonsmoking women the risk of developing cancer is three times greater than among nonsmoking men. Despite this, breast cancer remains the most common cancer in women in developed countries, and is one of the major chronic diseases of women, while cervical cancer remains one of the most common cancers in developing countries, associated with human papilloma virus (HPV), a sexually transmitted infection. HPV vaccine together with screening offers the promise of controlling these diseases. Other important health issues for women include cardiovascular disease, depression, dementia, osteoporosis and anemia.

In 176 out of 178 countries for which records are available, there is a gender gap in favor of women in life expectancy. In Western Europe, this has been the case at least as far back as 1750. Gender remains an important social determinant of health, since women's health is influenced not just by their biology but also by conditions such as poverty, employment, and family responsibilities. Women have long been disadvantaged in many respects such as social and economic power which restricts their access to the necessities of life including health care, and the greater the level of disadvantage, such as in developing countries, the greater adverse impact on health.

Women's reproductive and sexual health has a distinct difference compared to men's health. Even in developed countries, pregnancy and childbirth are associated with substantial risks to women with maternal mortality accounting for more than a quarter of a million deaths per year, with large gaps between the developing and developed countries. Comorbidity from other non-reproductive diseases such as cardiovascular disease contribute to both the mortality and morbidity of pregnancy, including preeclampsia. Sexually transmitted infections have serious consequences for women and infants, with mother-to-child transmission leading to outcomes such as stillbirths and neonatal deaths, and pelvic inflammatory disease leading to infertility. In addition, infertility from many other causes, birth control, unplanned pregnancy, rape and the struggle for access to abortion create other burdens for women.

== Definitions and scope ==
Women's experience of health and disease differ from those of men, due to unique biological, social and behavioral conditions. Biological differences vary from phenotypes to the cellular biology, and manifest unique risks for the development of ill health. WHO defines health as "a state of complete physical, mental and social well-being and not merely the absence of disease or infirmity". Women's health is an example of population health, the health of a specific defined population.

Women's health has been described as "a patchwork quilt with gaps". Although many of the issues around women's health relate to their reproductive health, including maternal and child health, genital health and breast health, and endocrine (hormonal) health, including menstruation, birth control and menopause, a broader understanding of women's health to include all aspects of the health of women has been urged, replacing "Women's Health" with "The Health of Women". WHO considers that an undue emphasis on reproductive health has been a major barrier to ensuring access to good quality health care for all women. Conditions that affect both men and women, such as cardiovascular disease, osteoporosis, also manifest differently in women. Women's health issues also include medical situations in which women face problems not directly related to their biology, such as gender-differentiated access to medical treatment and other socioeconomic factors. Women's health is of particular concern due to widespread discrimination against women in the world, leaving them disadvantaged.

A number of health and medical research advocates, such as the Society for Women's Health Research in the United States, support this broader definition, rather than merely issues specific to human female anatomy to include areas where biological sex differences between women and men exist. Women also need health care more and access the health care system more than do men. While part of this is due to their reproductive and sexual health needs, they also have more chronic non-reproductive health issues such as cardiovascular disease, cancer, mental illness, diabetes and osteoporosis. Another important perspective is realising that events across the entire life cycle (or life-course), from in utero to aging effect the growth, development and health of women. The life course perspective is one of the key strategies of the World Health Organization.

=== Global perspective ===
Gender differences in susceptibility and symptoms of disease and response to treatment in many areas of health are particularly true when viewed from a global perspective. Much of the available information comes from developed countries, yet there are marked differences between developed and developing countries in terms of women's roles and health. The global viewpoint is defined as the "area for study, research and practice that places a priority on improving health and achieving health equity for all people worldwide". In 2015 the World Health Organization identified the top ten issues in women's health as being cancer, reproductive health, maternal health, human immunodeficiency virus (HIV), sexually transmitted infections, violence, mental health, non communicable diseases, youth and aging.

== Life expectancy ==
Women's life expectancy is greater than that of men, and they have lower death rates throughout life, regardless of race and geographic region. Historically though, women had higher rates of mortality, primarily from maternal deaths (death in childbirth). In industrialised countries, particularly the most advanced, the gender gap narrowed and was reversed following the Industrial Revolution. Despite these differences, in many areas of health, women experience earlier and more severe disease, and experience poorer outcomes.

Despite these differences, the leading causes of death in the United States are remarkably similar for men and women, headed by heart disease, which accounts for a quarter of all deaths, followed by cancer, lung disease and stroke. While women have a lower incidence of death from unintentional injury and suicide, they have a higher incidence of dementia.

The major differences in life expectancy for women between developed and developing countries lie in the childbearing years. If a woman survives this period, the differences between the two regions become less marked, since in later life non-communicable diseases (NCDs) become the major causes of death in women throughout the world, with cardiovascular deaths accounting for 45% of deaths in older women, followed by cancer (15%) and lung disease (10%). These create additional burdens on the resources of developing countries. Changing lifestyles, including diet, physical activity and cultural factors that favour larger body size in women, are contributing to an increasing problem with obesity and diabetes amongst women in these countries and increasing the risks of cardiovascular disease, kidney disease and other NCDs. The prevalence of kidney disease is less common in women due to the estrogen-mediated protection from ferroptotic cell death.

Women who are socially marginalised are more likely to die at younger ages than women who are not. Women who have substance abuse disorders, who are homeless, who are sex workers, and/or who are imprisoned have significantly shorter lives than other women. At any given age, women in these overlapping, stigmatised groups are approximately 10 to 13 times more likely to die than typical women of the same age.

== Social and cultural factors ==
Logo of Sustainable Development Goal 5: Gender Equality

Women's health is positioned within a wider body of knowledge cited by, amongst others, the World Health Organization, which places importance on gender as a social determinant of health. While women's health is affected by their biology, it is also affected by their social conditions, such as poverty, employment, and family responsibilities, and these aspects should not be overshadowed.

Women have traditionally been disadvantaged in terms of economic and social status and power, which in turn reduces their access to the necessities of life including health care. Despite recent improvements in Western nations, women remain disadvantaged with respect to men. The gender gap in health is even more acute in developing countries where women are relatively more disadvantaged. In addition to gender inequity, there remain specific disease processes uniquely associated with being a woman which create specific challenges in both prevention and health care. Women's health is widely under researched even in the medical profession meaning many women who struggle with diseases such as polyendocrine metabolic ovarian syndrome (PMOS), endometriosis, PMDD and so on often go undiagnosed and untreated. Furthermore there is a lack of knowledge of how modern medicine reacts to women's bodies compared to men as most drug trials and formulas are catered to a males.

Between 2021 and 2025 less than two-thirds of women aged 15 to 49 years worldwide achieved minimum dietary diversity.

In low- and middle-income countries, women’s diets, often rich in staple foods, are frequently poor in vitamins and minerals, with consequences for health. Low dietary diversity jeopardizes nutrient adequacy. In 2025 only 62.7% of women aged 15 to 49 years consume a minimally diverse diet.

Deeply ingrained cultural, religious, and patriarchal systems within the MENA region perpetuate gender-based power dynamics within communities and lead to discrepancies in healthcare access. In a speech, UNFPA executive director Thoraya Ahmed Obaid outlined these difficulties and emphasized the need to change cultural and societal norms in order to improve the health of women in the area.

Even after succeeding in accessing health care, women have been discriminated against, a process that Iris Young has called "internal exclusion", as opposed to "external exclusion", the barriers to access. This invisibility effectively masks the grievances of groups already disadvantaged by power inequity, further entrenching injustice.

Behavioral differences also play a role, in which women display lower risk taking including consume less tobacco, alcohol, and drugs, reducing their risk of mortality from associated diseases, including lung cancer, tuberculosis and cirrhosis. Other risk factors that are lower for women include motor vehicle accidents. Occupational differences have exposed women to less industrial injuries, although this is likely to change, as is risk of injury or death in war. Overall such injuries contributed to 3.5% of deaths in women compared to 6.2% in the United States in 2009. Suicide rates are also less in women.

The social view of health combined with the acknowledgement that gender is a social determinant of health inform women's health service delivery in countries around the world. Women's health services such as Leichhardt Women's Community Health Centre which was established in 1974 and was the first women's health centre established in Australia is an example of women's health approach to service delivery.

Women's health is an issue which has been taken up by many feminists, especially where reproductive health is concerned and the international women's movement was responsible for much of the adoption of agendas to improve women's health.

== Biological factors ==
Factors that specifically affect the health of women compared to men are most evident in those related to reproduction, but sex differences have been identified from the molecular to the behavioral scale. Some of these differences are subtle and difficult to explain, partly due to the fact that it is difficult to separate the health effects of inherent biological factors from the effects of the surrounding environment they exist in. Women's XX sex chromosomes compliment, hormonal environment, as well as sex-specific lifestyles, metabolism, immune system function, and sensitivity to environmental factors are believed to contribute to sex differences in health at the levels of physiology, perception, and cognition. Women can have distinct responses to drugs and thresholds for diagnostic parameters. All of these necessitate caution in extrapolating information derived from biomarkers from one sex to the other. Young women and adolescents are at risk from STIs, pregnancy and unsafe abortion, while older women often have few resources and are disadvantaged with respect to men, and also are at risk of dementia and abuse, and generally poor health.

== Reproductive and sexual health ==
Women experience many unique health issues related to reproduction and sexuality and these are responsible for a third of all health problems experienced by women during their reproductive years (aged 15–44), of which unsafe sex is a major risk factor, especially in developing countries. Reproductive health includes a wide range of issues including the health and function of structures and systems involved in reproduction, pregnancy, childbirth and child rearing, including antenatal and perinatal care. Global women's health has a much larger focus on reproductive health than that of developed countries alone, but also infectious diseases such as malaria in pregnancy and non-communicable diseases (NCD). Many of the issues that face women and girls in resource poor regions are relatively unknown in developed countries, such as female genital cutting, and further lack access to the appropriate diagnostic and clinical resources.

=== Maternal health ===
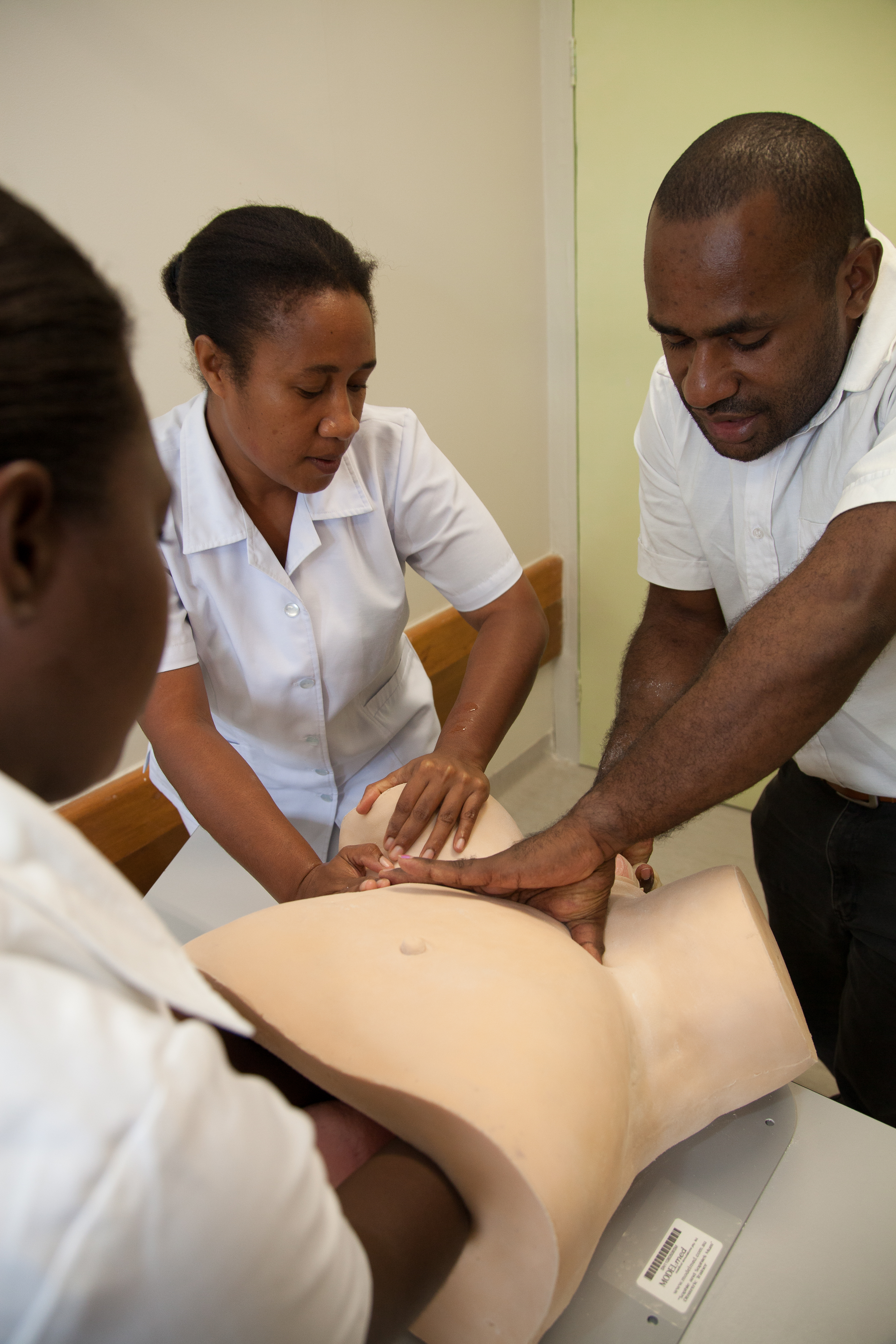
Midwifery training in Papua New Guinea

Pregnancy presents substantial health risks, even in developed countries, and despite advances in obstetrical science and practice. Maternal mortality remains a major problem in global health and is considered a sentinel event in judging the quality of health care systems. Adolescent pregnancy represents a particular problem, whether intended or unintended, and whether within marriage or a union or not. Pregnancy results in major changes in the life of a young female: physically, emotionally, socially and economically, and jeopardizes their transition into adulthood. Adolescent pregnancy, more often than not, stems from a girl's lack of choices. or abuse. Child marriage (see below) is a major contributor worldwide, since 90% of births to females aged 15–19 occur within marriage.

==== Maternal death ====
In 2013 about 289,000 women (800 per day) in the world died due to pregnancy-related causes, with large differences between developed and developing countries. In developed nations maternal mortality had been steadily falling and on average means 16 deaths per 100,000 live births, as measured by the maternal mortality ratio (MMR). By contrast rates as high as 1,000 deaths per 100,000 live births are reported in the rest of the world, with the highest rates in Sub-Saharan Africa and South Asia, which account for 86% of such deaths. These deaths are rarely investigated, yet the World Health Organization considers that 99% of these deaths, the majority of which occur within 24 hours of childbirth, are preventable if the appropriate infrastructure, training, and facilities were in place. In these resource-poor countries, maternal health is further eroded by poverty and adverse economic factors which impact the roads, health care facilities, equipment and supplies in addition to limited skilled personnel. Other problems include cultural attitudes towards sexuality, contraception, child marriage, home birth and the ability to recognise medical emergencies. The direct causes of these maternal deaths are hemorrhage, eclampsia, obstructed labor, sepsis and unskilled abortion. In addition malaria and AIDS can also endanger pregnancy. In the period 2003–2009 hemorrhage was the leading cause of death, accounting for 27% of deaths in developing countries and 16% in developed countries.

Non-reproductive health remains an important predictor of maternal health. In the United States, the leading causes of maternal death are cardiovascular disease (15% of deaths), endocrine, respiratory and gastrointestinal disorders, infection, hemorrhage and hypertensive disorders of pregnancy (Gronowski and Schindler, Table II).

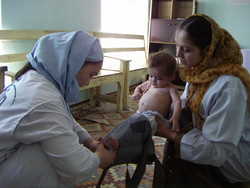
Maternal health clinic in Afghanistan

In 2000, the United Nations created Millennium Development Goal (MDG) 5 to improve maternal health. Target 5A sought to reduce maternal mortality by three quarters from 1990 to 2015, using two indicators, 5.1 the MMR and 5.2 the proportion of deliveries attended by skilled health personnel (physician, nurse or midwife). Early reports indicated MDG 5 had made the least progress of all MDGs. By the target date of 2015 the MMR had only declined by 45%, from 380 to 210, most of which occurred after 2000. However this improvement occurred across all regions, but the highest MMRs were still in Africa and Asia, although South Asia witnessed the largest fall, from 530 to 190 (64%). The smallest decline was seen in the developed countries, from 26 to 16 (37%). In terms of assisted births, this proportion had risen globally from 59 to 71%. Although the numbers were similar for both developed and developing regions, there were wide variations in the latter from 52% in South Asia to 100% in East Asia. The risks of dying in pregnancy in developing countries remains fourteen times higher than in developed countries, but in Sub-Saharan Africa, where the MMR is highest, the risk is 175 times higher. In setting the MDG targets, skilled assisted birth was considered a key strategy, but also an indicator of access to care and closely reflect mortality rates. There are also marked differences within regions with a 31% lower rate in rural areas of developing countries (56 vs. 87%), yet there is no difference in East Asia but a 52% difference in Central Africa (32 vs. 84%). With the completion of the MDG campaign in 2015, new targets are being set for 2030 under the Sustainable Development Goals campaign. Maternal health is placed under Goal 3, Health, with the target being to reduce the global maternal mortality ratio to less than 70. Amongst tools being developed to meet these targets is the WHO Safe Childbirth Checklist.

Improvements in maternal health, in addition to professional assistance at delivery, will require routine antenatal care, basic emergency obstetric care, including the availability of antibiotics, oxytocics, anticonvulsants, the ability to manually remove a retained placenta, perform instrumented deliveries, and postpartum care that is financially accessible, such as through insurance. Research has shown the most effective programmes are those focussing on patient and community education, prenatal care, emergency obstetrics (including access to cesarean sections) and transportation. As with women's health in general, solutions to maternal health require a broad view encompassing many of the other MDG goals, such as poverty and status, and given that most deaths occur in the immediate intrapartum period, it has been recommended that intrapartum care (delivery) be a core strategy. New guidelines on antenatal care were issued by WHO in November 2016.

==== Complications of pregnancy ====
In addition to death occurring in pregnancy and childbirth, pregnancy can result in many non-fatal health problems including obstetrical fistulae, ectopic pregnancy, preterm labor, gestational diabetes, hyperemesis gravidarum, hypertensive states including preeclampsia, and anemia. Globally, complications of pregnancy vastly outway maternal deaths, with an estimated 9.5 million cases of pregnancy-related illness and 1.4 million near-misses (survival from severe life-threatening complications). Complications of pregnancy may be physical, mental, economic and social. It is estimated that 10–20 million women will develop physical or mental disability every year, resulting from complications of pregnancy or inadequate care. Consequently, international agencies have developed standards for obstetric care.

Many do not understand how past pregnancy complications impact future pregnancy birthing options. It is a common misconception that after one Cesarean Section birth, it is medically necessary for all future births. One C-section procedure does not deem parents ineligible for safe vaginal delivery.

===== Obstetrical fistula =====
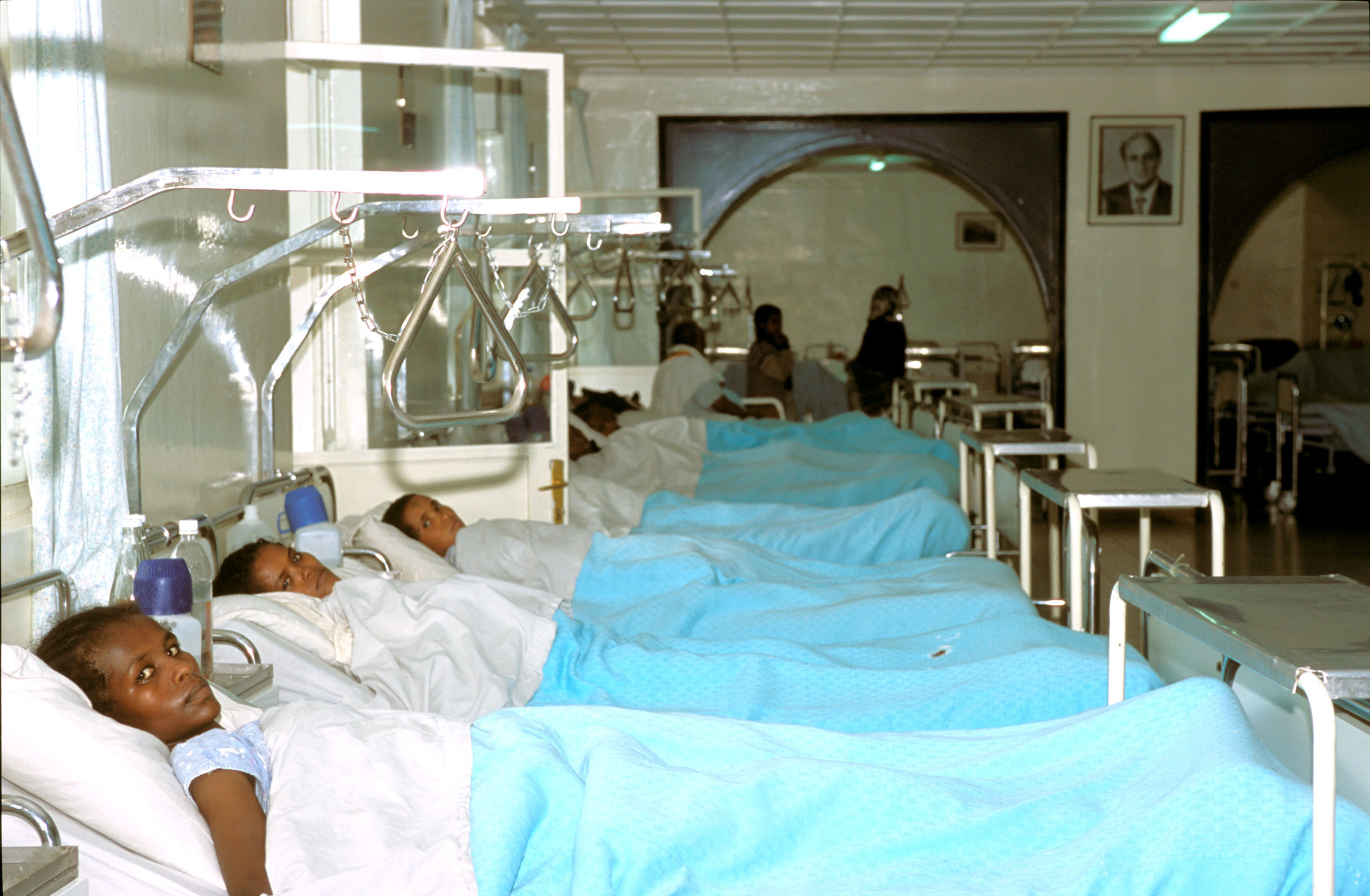
Women in an Ethiopian fistula hospital

Of near miss events, obstetrical fistulae (OF), including vesicovaginal and rectovaginal fistulae, remain one of the most serious and tragic. Although corrective surgery is possible it is often not available and OF is considered completely preventable. If repaired, subsequent pregnancies will require cesarean section. While unusual in developed countries, it is estimated that up to 100,000 cases occur every year in the world, and that about 2 million women are currently living with this condition, with the highest incidence occurring in Africa and parts of Asia. OF results from prolonged obstructed labor without intervention, when continued pressure from the fetus in the birth canal restricts blood supply to the surrounding tissues, with eventual fetal death, necrosis and expulsion. The damaged pelvic organs then develop a connection (fistula) allowing urine or feces, or both, to be discharged through the vagina with associated urinary and fecal incontinence, vaginal stenosis, nerve damage and infertility. Severe social and mental consequences are also likely to follow, with shunning of the women. Apart from lack of access to care, causes include young age, and malnourishment. The UNFPA has made prevention of OF a priority and is the lead agency in the Campaign to End Fistula, which issues annual reports and the United Nations observes May 23 as the International Day to End Obstetric Fistula every year. Prevention includes discouraging teenage pregnancy and child marriage, adequate nutrition, and access to skilled care, including caesarean section.

=== Sexual health ===
==== Contraception ====
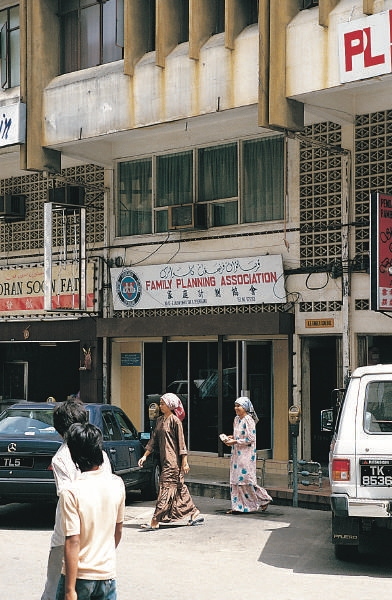
Family Planning Association: Kuala Terengganu, Malaysia

The ability to determine if and when to become pregnant, is vital to a woman's autonomy and well-being, and contraception can protect girls and young women from the risks of early pregnancy and older women from the increased risks of unintended pregnancy. Adequate access to contraception can limit multiple pregnancies, reduce the need for potentially unsafe abortion and reduce maternal and infant mortality and morbidity. Some barrier forms of contraception such as condoms, also reduce the risk of STIs and HIV infection. Access to contraception allows women to make informed choices about their reproductive and sexual health, increases empowerment, and enhances choices in education, careers and participation in public life. At the societal level, access to contraception is a key factor in controlling population growth, with resultant impact on the economy, the environment and regional development. Consequently, the United Nations considers access to contraception a human right that is central to gender equality and women's empowerment that saves lives and reduces poverty, and birth control has been considered amongst the 10 great public health achievements of the 20th century.

To optimise women's control over pregnancy, it is essential that culturally appropriate contraceptive advice and means are widely, easily, and affordably available to anyone that is sexually active, including adolescents. In many parts of the world access to contraception and family planning services is very difficult or non existent and even in developed countries cultural and religious traditions can create barriers to access. Reported usage of adequate contraception by women has risen only slightly between 1990 and 2014, with considerable regional variability. Although global usage is around 55%, it may be as low as 25% in Africa. Research shows that women in the Middle East and North Africa use contraception at low rates. Only 14% of women who completed a survey in Jordan said they used condoms with their spouses. Worldwide 222 million women have no or limited access to contraception. Some caution is needed in interpreting available data, since contraceptive prevalence is often defined as "the percentage of women currently using any method of contraception among all women of reproductive age (i.e., those aged 15 to 49 years, unless otherwise stated) who are married or in a union. The "in-union" group includes women living with their partner in the same household and who are not married according to the marriage laws or customs of a country." This definition is more suited to the more restrictive concept of family planning, but omits the contraceptive needs of all other women and girls who are or are likely to be sexually active, are at risk of pregnancy and are not married or "in-union".

Three related targets of MDG5 were adolescent birth rate, contraceptive prevalence and unmet need for family planning (where prevalence+unmet need = total need), which were monitored by the Population Division of the UN Department of Economic and Social Affairs. Contraceptive use was part of Goal 5B (universal access to reproductive health), as Indicator 5.3. The evaluation of MDG5 in 2015 showed that amongst couples usage had increased worldwide from 55% to 64%. with one of the largest increases in Subsaharan Africa (13 to 28%). The corollary, unmet need, declined slightly worldwide (15 to 12%). In 2015 these targets became part of SDG5 (gender equality and empowerment) under Target 5.6: Ensure universal access to sexual and reproductive health and reproductive rights, where Indicator 5.6.1 is the proportion of women aged 15–49 years who make their own informed decisions regarding sexual relations, contraceptive use and reproductive health care (p. 31).

There remain significant barriers to accessing contraception for many women in both developing and developed regions. These include legislative, administrative, cultural, religious and economic barriers in addition to those dealing with access to and quality of health services. Much of the attention has been focused on preventing adolescent pregnancy. The Overseas Development Institute (ODI) has identified a number of key barriers, on both the supply and demand side, including internalising socio-cultural values, pressure from family members, and cognitive barriers (lack of knowledge), which need addressing. Even in developed regions many women, particularly those who are disadvantaged, may face substantial difficulties in access that may be financial and geographic but may also face religious and political discrimination. Women have also mounted campaigns against potentially dangerous forms of contraception such as defective intrauterine devices (IUD)s, particularly the Dalkon Shield.

==== Abortion ====
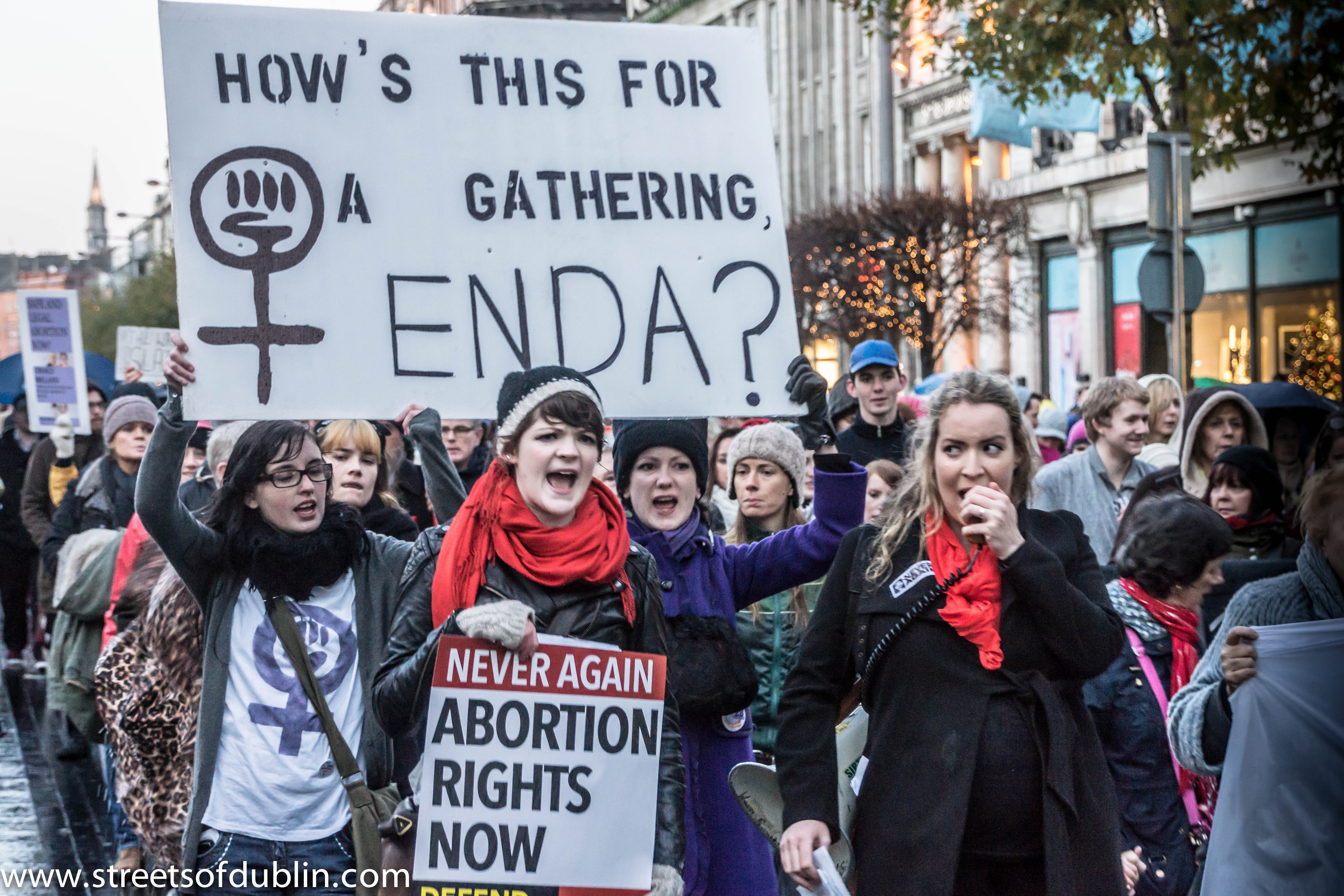
Women demonstrate for abortion rights, Dublin, 2012

Abortion is the intentional killing of an unborn child, as compared to spontaneous termination (miscarriage). Abortion is closely allied to contraception in terms of women's control and regulation of their reproduction, and is often subject to similar cultural, religious, legislative and economic constraints. Where access to contraception is limited, women turn to abortion. Consequently, abortion rates may be used to estimate unmet needs for contraception. However the available procedures have carried great risk for women throughout most of history, and still do in the developing world, or where legal restrictions force women to seek clandestine facilities. Access to safe legal abortion places undue burdens on lower socioeconomic groups and in jurisdictions that create significant barriers. These issues have frequently been the subject of political and feminist campaigns where differing viewpoints pit health against moral values.

Globally, there were 87 million unwanted pregnancies in 2005, of those 46 million resorted to abortion, of which 18 million were considered unsafe, resulting in 46,068,000 deaths. The majority of these deaths occurred in the developing world. The United Nations considers these avoidable with access to safe abortion and post-abortion care. While abortion rates have fallen in developed countries, but not in developing countries. Between 2010 and 2014 there were 35 abortions per 1000 women aged 15–44, a total of 56 million abortions per year. The United nations has prepared recommendations for health care workers to provide more accessible and safe abortion and post-abortion care. An inherent part of post-abortion care involves provision of adequate contraception.

==== Sexually transmitted infections ====
Important sexual health issues for women include Sexually transmitted infections (STIs) and female genital cutting (FGC). STIs are a global health priority because they have serious consequences for women and infants. Mother-to-child transmission of STIs can lead to stillbirths, neonatal death, low-birth-weight and prematurity, sepsis, pneumonia, neonatal conjunctivitis, and congenital deformities. Syphilis in pregnancy results in over 300,000 fetal and neonatal deaths per year, and 215,000 infants with an increased risk of death from prematurity, low-birth-weight or congenital disease.

Diseases such as chlamydia and gonorrhoea are also important causes of pelvic inflammatory disease (PID) and subsequent infertility in women. Another important consequence of some STIs such as genital herpes and syphilis increase the risk of acquiring HIV by three-fold, and can also influence its transmission progression. Worldwide, women and girls are at greater risk of HIV/AIDS. STIs are in turn associated with unsafe sexual activity that is often unconsensual. In the Middle East and North Africa (MENA), a large number of HIV-positive women contracted the virus from their spouses or partners. In comparison to men, taboos, and discrimination against women living with HIV are more pervasive throughout the MENA region. Women in the MENA region are more vulnerable to HIV because of gender inequity, gender-based violence, and restricted access to comprehensive healthcare systems.

==== Female genital mutilation ====
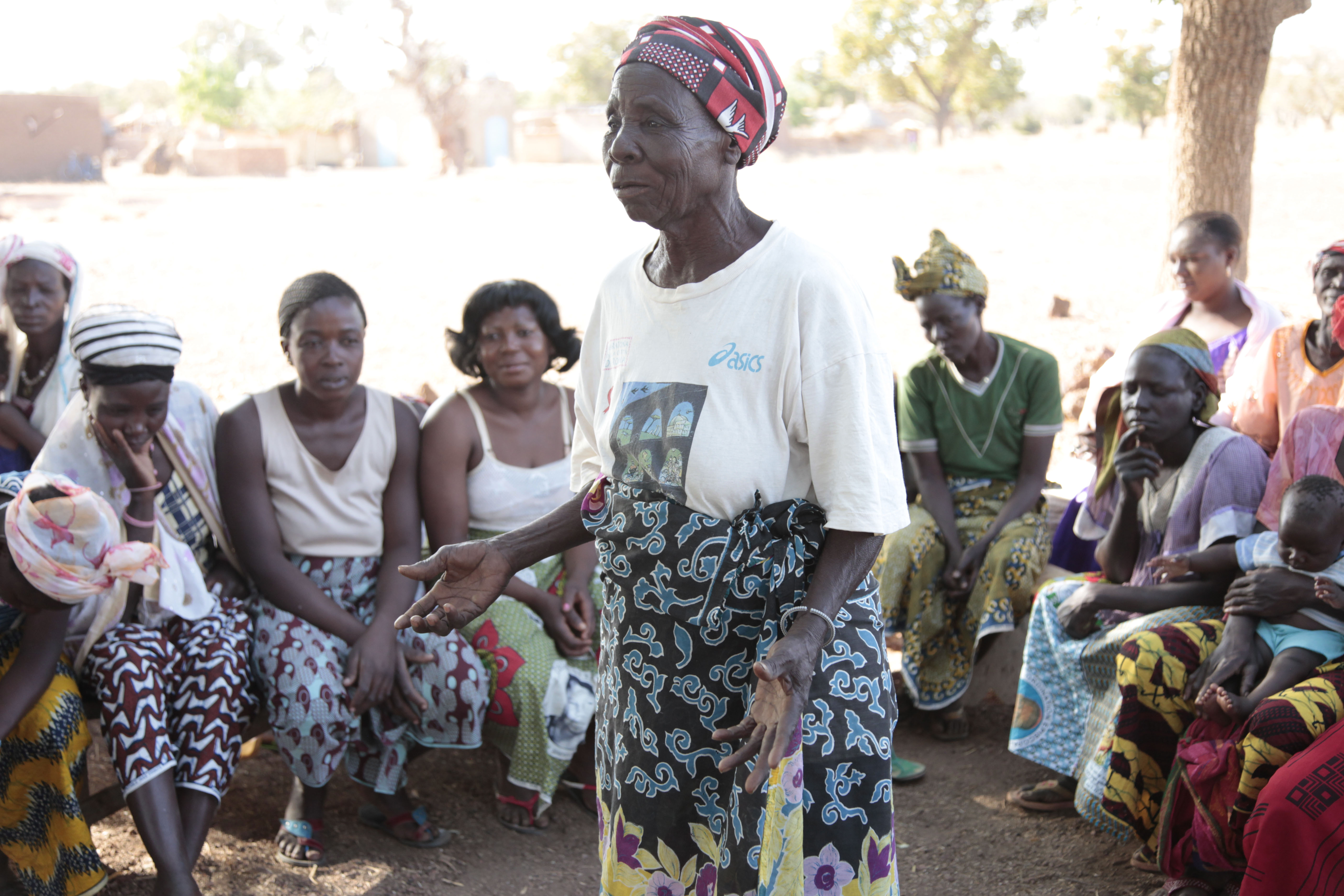
Traditional African midwife explaining the risks of FGC for childbirth at a community meeting

Female genital mutilation (also referred to as female genital cutting) is defined by the World Health Organization (WHO) as "all procedures that involve partial or total removal of the external female genitalia, or other injury to the female genital organs for non-medical reasons". It has sometimes been referred to as female circumcision, although this term is misleading because it implies it is analogous to the circumcision of the foreskin from the male penis. Consequently, the term mutilation was adopted to emphasise the gravity of the act and its place as a violation of human rights. Subsequently, the term cutting was advanced to avoid offending cultural sensibility that would interfere with dialogue for change. To recognise these points of view some agencies use the composite female genital mutilation/cutting (FMG/C).

FGM prevalence in the Middle East and Africa - 2024.

It has affected more than 200 million women and girls who are alive today. The practice is concentrated in some 30 countries in Africa, the Middle East and Asia. Female genital mutilation is still common, impacting around 50 million women and girls in the five countries of Yemen, Egypt, Sudan, Djibouti, and Iraq in the Middle East and North Africa (MENA) region, as adolescent women frequently experience a lack of bodily autonomy in the Arab world. According to data, the frequency of FGM among women between the ages of 15 and 49 is high: 94% in Djibouti, 87% in Egypt and Sudan, 19% in Yemen, and 7% in Iraq. FGC affects many religious faiths, nationalities, and socioeconomic classes and is highly controversial. The main arguments advanced to justify FGC are hygiene, fertility, the preservation of chastity, an important rite of passage, marriageability and enhanced sexual pleasure of male partners. The amount of tissue removed varies considerably, leading the WHO and other bodies to classify FGC into four types. These range from the partial or total removal of the clitoris with or without the prepuce (clitoridectomy) in Type I, to the additional removal of the labia minora, with or without excision of the labia majora (Type II) to narrowing of the vaginal orifice (introitus) with the creation of a covering seal by suturing the remaining labial tissue over the urethra and introitus, with or without excision of the clitoris (infibulation). In this type a small opening is created to allow urine and menstrual blood to be discharged. Type 4 involves all other procedures, usually relatively minor alterations such as piercing.

While defended by those cultures in which it constitutes a tradition, FGC is opposed by many medical and cultural organizations on the grounds that it is unnecessary and harmful. Short-term health effects may include hemorrhage, infection, sepsis, and even result in death, while long term effects include dyspareunia, dysmenorrhea, vaginitis and cystitis. In addition FGC leads to complications with pregnancy, labor and delivery. Reversal (defibulation) by skilled personnel may be required to open the scarred tissue. Amongst those opposing the practice are local grassroots groups, and national and international organisations including WHO, UNICEF, UNFPA and Amnesty International. Legislative efforts to ban FGC have rarely been successful and the preferred approach is education and empowerment and the provision of information about the adverse health effects as well the human rights aspects.

Progress has been made but girls 14 and younger represent 44 million of those who have been cut, and in some regions 50% of all girls aged 11 and younger have been cut. Ending FGC has been considered one of the necessary goals in achieving the targets of the Millennium Development Goals, while the United Nations has declared ending FGC a target of the Sustainable Development Goals, and for February 6 to known as the International Day of Zero Tolerance for Female Genital Mutilation, concentrating on 17 African countries and the 5 million girls between the ages of 15 and 19 that would otherwise be cut by 2030.

=== Infertility ===
In the United States, infertility affects 1.5 million couples. The rates of infertility in the Middle East and North Africa (MENA) are difficult to measure due to varying definitions of the condition. When infertility is defined as failure to have a successful birth, the MENA region has a very high rate at 33%. Morocco has the highest percentage of infertility among the MENA countries with an infertility rate of 56.8%. Rates of infertility, defined as failure to conceive (clinical infertility), are probably lower in the region but there is a lack of data on the exact numbers. There is a dearth of research on clinical infertility in the MENA region, with the exception of Iran, which is attributed to a societal reluctance to discuss infertility openly.

Many couples seek assisted reproductive technology (ART) for infertility. In the United States in 2010, 147,260 in vitro fertilization (IVF) procedures were carried out, with 47,090 live births resulting. In 2013 these numbers had increased to 160,521 and 53,252. However, about a half of IVF pregnancies result in multiple-birth deliveries, which in turn are associated with an increase in both morbidity and mortality of the mother and the infant. Causes for this include increased maternal blood pressure, premature birth and low birth weight. In addition, more women are waiting longer to conceive and seeking ART.

=== Child marriage ===
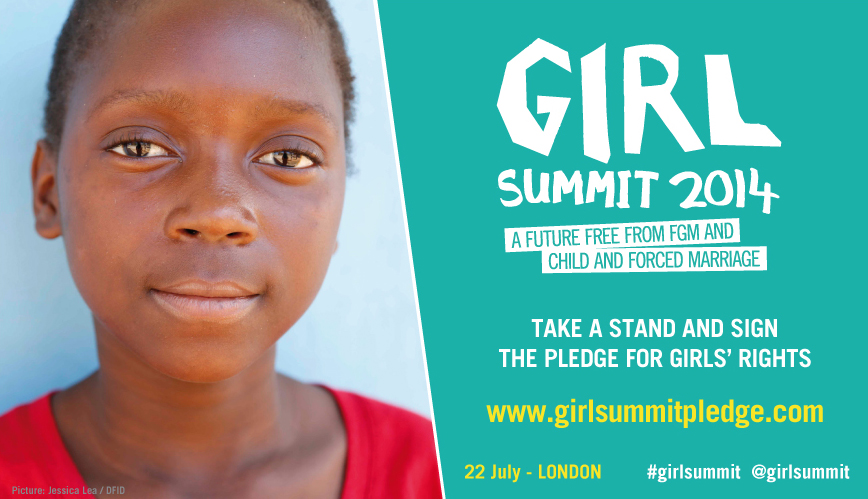
Poster addressing the 2014 London Girl Summit dealing with FGM and Child Marriage

Child marriage (including union or cohabitation) is defined as marriage under the age of eighteen and is an ancient custom. In 2010 it was estimated that 67 million women, then, in their twenties had been married before they turned eighteen, and that 150 million would be in the next decade, equivalent to 15 million per year. This number had increased to 70 million by 2012. In developing countries one third of girls are married under age, and 1:9 before 15. The practice is most common in South Asia (48% of women), Africa (42%) and Latin America and the Caribbean (29%). The highest prevalence is in Western and Sub-Saharan Africa. The percentage of girls married before the age of eighteen is as high as 75% in countries such as Niger. Approximately one in five young women in the Middle East and North Africa were married before becoming eighteen, and one in twenty-five married before turning fifteen. In Egypt, 17% of women in the 20–24 age group, 13% in Morocco, 28% in Iraq, 8% in Jordan, 6% in Lebanon, and 3% in Algeria were married or engaged before turning 18. Most child marriage involves girls. For instance in Mali the ratio of girls to boys is 72:1, while in countries such as the United States the ratio is 8:1. Marriage may occur as early as birth, with the girl being sent to her husbands home as early as age seven.

There are a number of cultural factors that reinforce this practice. These include the child's financial future, her dowry, social ties and social status, prevention of premarital sex, extramarital pregnancy and STIs. The arguments against it include interruption of education and loss of employment prospects, and hence economic status, as well as loss of normal childhood and its emotional maturation and social isolation. Child marriage places the girl in a relationship where she is in a major imbalance of power and perpetuates the gender inequality that contributed to the practice in the first place. Also in the case of minors, there are the issues of human rights, non-consensual sexual activity and forced marriage and a 2016 joint report of the WHO and Inter-Parliamentary Union places the two concepts together as Child, Early and Forced Marriage (CEFM), as did the 2014 Girl Summit (see below). In addition the likely pregnancies at a young age are associated with higher medical risks for both mother and child, multiple pregnancies and less access to care with pregnancy being amongst the leading causes of death amongst girls aged 15–19. Girls married under age are also more likely to be the victims of domestic violence.

There has been an international effort to reduce this practice, and in many countries eighteen is the legal age of marriage. Organizations with campaigns to end child marriage include the United Nations and its agencies, such as the Office of the High Commissioner for Human Rights, UNFPA, UNICEF and WHO. Like many global issues affecting women's health, poverty and gender inequality are root causes, and any campaign to change cultural attitudes has to address these. Child marriage is the subject of international conventions and agreements such as The Convention on the Elimination of All Forms of Discrimination against Women (CEDAW, 1979) (article 16) and the Universal Declaration of Human Rights and in 2014 a summit conference (Girl Summit) co-hosted by UNICEF and the UK was held in London (see illustration) to address this issue together with FGM/C. Later that same year the General Assembly of the United Nations passed a resolution, which among other things

Urges all States to enact, enforce and uphold laws and policies aimed at preventing and ending child, early and forced marriage and protecting those at risk, and ensure that marriage is entered into only with the informed, free and full consent of the intending spouses (5 September 2014)

Amongst non-governmental organizations (NGOs) working to end child marriage are Girls not Brides, Young Women's Christian Association (YWCA), the International Center for Research on Women (ICRW) and Human Rights Watch (HRW). Although not explicitly included in the original Millennium Development Goals, considerable pressure was applied to include ending child marriage in the successor Sustainable Development Goals adopted in September 2015, where ending this practice by 2030 is a target of SDG 5 Gender Equality (see above). While some progress is being made in reducing child marriage, particularly for girls under fifteen, the prospects are daunting. The indicator for this will be the percentage of women aged 20–24 who were married or in a union before the age of eighteen. Efforts to end child marriage include legislation and ensuring enforcement together with empowering women and girls. To raise awareness, the inaugural UN International Day of the Girl Child (Note: Declared in 2011 and observed annually on October 11) in 2012 was dedicated to ending child marriage.

=== Menstrual cycle ===

Women's menstrual cycles, the approximately monthly cycle of changes in the reproductive system, can pose significant challenges for women in their reproductive years (the early teens to about 50 years of age). These include the physiological changes that can effect physical and mental health, symptoms of ovulation and the regular shedding of the inner lining of the uterus (endometrium) accompanied by vaginal bleeding (menses or menstruation). The onset of menstruation (menarche) may be alarming to unprepared girls and mistaken for illness. Menstruation can place undue burdens on women in terms of their ability to participate in activities, and access to menstrual aids such as tampons and sanitary pads. This is particularly acute amongst poorer socioeconomic groups where they may represent a financial burden and in developing countries where menstruation can be an impediment to a girl's education. In the Middle East and North Africa, period poverty and stigma have an influence on girls' education and general well-being. Misinformation and a lack of fundamental knowledge cause girls to miss school during their menstrual cycle and contribute to the prevailing stigma around getting your period.

Equally challenging for women are the physiological and emotional changes associated with the cessation of menses (menopause or climacteric). While typically occurring gradually towards the end of the fifth decade in life marked by irregular bleeding the cessation of ovulation and menstruation is accompanied by marked changes in hormonal activity, both by the ovary itself (oestrogen and progesterone) and the pituitary gland (follicle stimulating hormone or FSH and luteinizing hormone or LH). These hormonal changes may be associated with both systemic sensations such as hot flashes and local changes to the reproductive tract such as reduced vaginal secretions and lubrication. While menopause may bring relief from symptoms of menstruation and fear of pregnancy it may also be accompanied by emotional and psychological changes associated with the symbolism of the loss of fertility and a reminder of aging and possible loss of desirability. While menopause generally occurs naturally as a physiological process it may occur earlier (premature menopause) as a result of disease or from medical or surgical intervention. When menopause occurs prematurely the adverse consequences may be more severe.

=== Other issues ===
Other reproductive and sexual health issues include sex education, puberty, sexuality and sexual function. Women also experience a number of issues related to the health of their breasts and genital tract, which fall into the scope of gynaecology.

== Non-reproductive health ==
Women and men have different experiences of the same illnesses, especially cardiovascular disease, cancer, depression and dementia. Women are also more prone to urinary tract infections than men.

=== Cardiovascular disease ===
Cardiovascular disease is the leading cause of death (35%) amongst women globally. The onset occurs at a later age in women than in men. For instance the incidence of stroke in women under the age of 80 is less than that in men, but higher in those aged over 80. Overall the lifetime risk of stroke in women exceeds that in men. The risk of cardiovascular disease amongst those with diabetes and amongst smokers is also higher in women than in men. Many aspects of cardiovascular disease vary between women and men, including risk factors, prevalence, physiology, symptoms, response to intervention and outcome. Among women in the Middle East, cardiovascular disease-related morbidity and death are increasing. At the same time, awareness and education on the disease, as well as research, are lacking in the region.

=== Cancer ===
Women and men have approximately equal risk of dying from cancer, which accounts for about a quarter of all deaths, and is the second leading cause of death. However the relative incidence of different cancers varies between women and men. Globally the three most common types of cancer of women in 2020 were breast, lung and colorectal cancers. These three account for 44.5% of all cancer cases in women. Other types of cancers specifically affecting women include ovarian, uterine (endometrial and cervical) cancers.

While cancer death rates rose rapidly during the twentieth century, the increase was less and happened later in women due to differences in smoking rates. More recently cancer death rates have started to decline as the use of tobacco becomes less common. Between 1991 and 2012, the death rate in women declined by 19% (less than in men). In the early twentieth century death from uterine (uterine body and cervix) cancers was the leading cause of cancer death in women, who had a higher cancer mortality than men. From the 1930s onwards, uterine cancer deaths declined, primarily due to lower death rates from cervical cancer following the availability of the Papanicolaou (Pap) screening test. This resulted in an overall reduction of cancer deaths in women between the 1940s and 1970s, when rising rates of lung cancer led to an overall increase. By the 1950s the decline in uterine cancer left breast cancer as the leading cause of cancer death until it was overtaken by lung cancer in the 1980s. All three cancers (lung, breast, uterus) are now declining in cancer death rates, but more women die from lung cancer every year than from breast, ovarian, and uterine cancers combined. Overall about 20% of people found to have lung cancer are never smokers, yet amongst nonsmoking women the risk of developing lung cancer is three times greater than amongst men who never smoked.

In addition to mortality, cancer is a cause of considerable morbidity in women. Women have a lower lifetime probability of being diagnosed with cancer (38% vs 45% for men), but are more likely to be diagnosed with cancer at an earlier age.

==== Breast cancer ====
Breast cancer is most common type of cancer among women. Globally, it accounts for 25% of all cancers. It is also among the ten most common chronic diseases of women, and a substantial contributor to loss of quality of life. In 2016, breast cancer was the most common cancer diagnosed among women in both developed and developing countries, accounting for nearly 30% of all cases, and worldwide accounts for one and a half million cases and over half a million deaths, being the fifth most common cause of cancer death overall and the second in developed regions. In the Middle East and North Africa, there were 95,000 cases of breast cancer in 2019. The countries with the highest age-standardized prevalence rates per 100,000 females in the region were Bahrain, Qatar, and Lebanon. Geographic variation in incidence is the opposite of that of cervical cancer, being highest in Northern America and lowest in Eastern and Middle Africa, but mortality rates are relatively constant, resulting in a wide variance in case mortality, ranging from 25% in developed regions to 37% in developing regions, and with 62% of deaths occurring in developing countries.

==== Cervical cancer ====
Globally, cervical cancer is the fourth most common cancer amongst women. It is particularly common in women with lower socioeconomic status, living in low-and middle-income countries who have reduced access to health care. Customs and cultural practices that involve child and forced marriage, higher rates of parity, polygamy and exposure to STIs from multiple sexual contacts of male partners further increase the chances of cervical cancer. In developing countries, cervical cancer accounts for 12% of cancer cases amongst women and is the second leading cause of death, where about 85% of the global burden of over 500,000 cases and 250,000 deaths from this disease occurred in 2012. The highest incidence occurs in Eastern Africa, where with Middle Africa, cervical cancer is the most common cancer in women. The case fatality rate of 52% is also higher in developing countries than in developed countries (43%), and the mortality rate varies by 18-fold between regions of the world.

Cervical cancer is associated with human papillomavirus (HPV), which has also been implicated in cancers of the vulva, vagina, anus, and oropharynx. Almost 300 million women worldwide have been infected with HPV, one of the commoner sexually transmitted infections, and 5% of the 13 million new cases of cancer in the world have been attributed to HPV. In developed countries, screening for cervical cancer using the Pap test has identified pre-cancerous changes in the cervix, at least in those women with access to health care. Also an HPV vaccine programme is available in 45 countries. Screening and prevention programmes have limited availability in developing countries although inexpensive low technology programmes are being developed, but access to treatment is also limited. If applied globally, HPV vaccination at 70% coverage could save the lives of 4 million women from cervical cancer, since most cases occur in developing countries.

==== Ovarian cancer ====
Ovarian cancer is the eighth most common cancer globally. It is predominantly a disease of women in industrialized countries and death from ovarian cancer is more common in North America and Europe than in Africa and Asia. Because it is largely asymptomatic in its earliest stages and lacks an effective screening programme, more than 50% of women have stage III or higher cancer (spread beyond the ovaries) by the time they are diagnosed, with a consequent poor prognosis.

=== Mental health ===
Almost 25% of women will experience mental health issues over their lifetime. Women are at higher risk than men from anxiety, depression, and psychosomatic complaints. Globally, depression is the leading disease burden. In the United States, women have depression twice as often as men. The economic costs of depression in American women are estimated to be $20 billion every year. The risks of depression in women have been linked to changing hormonal environment that women experience, including puberty, menstruation, pregnancy, childbirth and the menopause. Women also metabolise drugs used to treat depression differently to men. Suicide rates are less in women than men (<1% vs. 2.4%), but are a leading cause of death for women under the age of 60. In the United Kingdom, the Women's Mental Health Taskforce was formed aiming to address differences in mental health experiences and needs between women and men.

=== Dementia ===
The prevalence of Alzheimer's disease in the United States is estimated at 5.1 million, and of these two thirds are women. Furthermore, women are far more likely to be the primary caregivers of adult family members with dementia, so that they bear both the risks and burdens of this disease. The lifetime risk for a woman of developing Alzheimer's disease is twice that of men. Part of this difference may be due to life expectancy, but changing hormonal status over their lifetime may also play a part as may differences in gene expression. Deaths due to dementia are higher in women than men (4.5% of deaths vs. 2.0%).

=== Bone health ===
Osteoporosis ranks sixth amongst chronic diseases of women in the United States, with an overall prevalence of 18%, and a much higher rate involving the femur, neck or lumbar spine amongst women (16%) than men (4%), over the age of 50. Osteoporosis is a risk factor for bone fracture and about 20% of senior citizens who sustain a hip fracture die within a year. The gender gap is largely the result of the reduction of estrogen levels in women following the menopause. Hormone Replacement Therapy (HRT) has been shown to reduce this risk by 25–30%, and was a common reason for prescribing it during the 1980s and 1990s. However the Women's Health Initiative (WHI) study that demonstrated that the risks of HRT outweighed the benefits has since led to a decline in HRT usage.

=== Anaemia ===
Anaemia is a major global health problem for women. Women are affected more than men, in which up to 30% of women being found to be anaemic and 42% of pregnant women. Anaemia is linked to a number of adverse health outcomes including a poor pregnancy outcome and impaired cognitive function (decreased concentration and attention). The main cause of anaemia is iron deficiency. In United States women iron deficiency anaemia (IDA) affects 37% of pregnant women, but globally the prevalence is as high as 80%. Anaemia affects over one-third of the population in the Middle East and North Africa, caused by iron deficiencies or a combination of other factors, with women making up the bulk of those affected. In Saudi Arabia, 40% of women in the 15–49 age range suffer from anaemia. IDA starts in adolescence, from excess menstrual blood loss, compounded by the increased demand for iron in growth and suboptimal dietary intake. In the adult woman, pregnancy leads to further iron depletion.

=== Violence ===
Women experience structural and personal violence differently than men. The United Nations has defined violence against women as;

" any act of gender-based violence that results in, or is likely to result in, physical, sexual or mental harm or suffering to women, including threats of such acts, coercion or arbitrary deprivation of liberty, whether occurring in public or in private life." (United Nations, Declaration on the Elimination of Violence against Women, 1993)

Violence against women may take many forms, including physical, sexual, emotional and psychological and may occur throughout the life-course. Structural violence may be embedded in legislation or policy, or be systematic misogyny by organisations against groups of women. Perpetrators of personal violence include state actors, strangers, acquaintances, relatives and intimate partners and manifests itself across a spectrum from discrimination, through harassment, sexual assault and rape, and physical harm to murder (femicide). It may also include cultural practices such as female genital cutting.

Non-fatal violence against women has severe implications for women's physical, mental and reproductive health, and is seen as not simply isolated events but rather a systematic pattern of behaviour that both violates their rights but also limits their role in society and requires a systematic approach.

The World Health Organization (WHO) estimates published in 2023 indicate that about 31.6% of women worldwide have experienced physical and/or sexual intimate-partner violence or non-partner sexual violence in their lifetime. 30% of women in relationships report such experience, and 38% of murders of women are due to intimate partners. These figures may be as high as 70% in some regions. Risk factors include low educational achievement, a parental experience of violence, childhood abuse, gender inequality and cultural attitudes that allow violence to be considered more acceptable.

The COVID-19 epidemic made gender-based violence more common in Arab countries and worsened already-existing health disparities between the sexes. Yet millions of women in the Middle East and North Africa did not receive enough attention when it came to the provision of enhanced protection from gender-based violence.

Violence was declared a global health priority by the WHO at its assembly in 1996, drawing on both the United Nations Declaration on the elimination of violence against women (1993) and the recommendations of both the International Conference on Population and Development (Cairo, 1994) and the Fourth World Conference on Women (Beijing, 1995) This was followed by its 2002 World Report on Violence and Health, which focusses on intimate partner and sexual violence. Meanwhile, the UN embedded these in an action plan when its General Assembly passed the Millennium Declaration in September 2000, which resolved among other things "to combat all forms of violence against women and to implement the Convention on the Elimination of All Forms of Discrimination against Women". One of the Millennium Goals (MDG 3) was the promotion of gender equality and the empowerment of women, which sought to eliminate all forms of violence against women as well as implementing CEDAW. This recognised that eliminating violence, including discrimination was a prerequisite to achieving all other goals of improving women's health. However it was later criticised for not including violence as an explicit target, the "missing target". In the evaluation of MDG 3, violence remained a major barrier to achieving the goals. In the successor Sustainable Development Goals, which also explicitly list the related issues of discrimination, child marriage and genital cutting, one target is listed as "Eliminate all forms of violence against all women and girls in the public and private spheres" by 2030.

UN Women believe that violence against women "is rooted in gender-based discrimination and social norms and gender stereotypes that perpetuate such violence", and advocate moving from supporting victims to prevention, through addressing root and structural causes. They recommend programmes that start early in life and are directed towards both genders to promote respect and equality, an area often overlooked in public policy. This strategy, which involves broad educational and cultural change, also involves implementing the recommendations of the 57th session of the UN Commission on the Status of Women (2013). To that end the 2014 UN International Day of the Girl Child was dedicated to ending the cycle of violence. In 2016, the World Health Assembly also adopted a plan of action to combat violence against women, globally.

== Women in health research ==
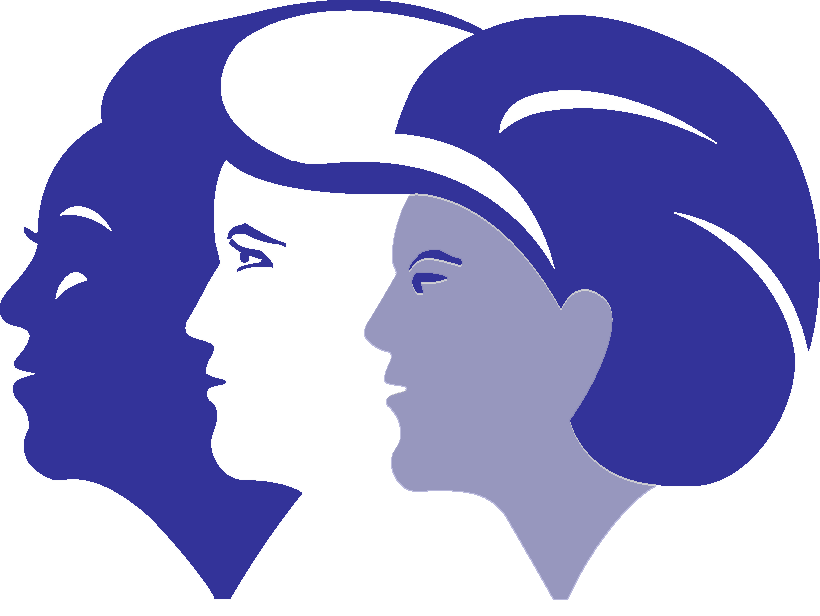
Women's Health Initiative logo

Changes in the way research ethics was visualised in the wake of the Nuremberg Trials (1946), led to an atmosphere of protectionism of groups deemed to be vulnerable that was often legislated or regulated. This resulted in the relative underrepresentation of women in clinical trials. The position of women in research was further compromised in 1977, when in response to the tragedies resulting from thalidomide and diethylstilbestrol (DES), the United States Food and Drug Administration (FDA) prohibited women of child-bearing years from participation in early stage clinical trials. In practice this ban was often applied very widely to exclude all women. Women, at least those in the child-bearing years, and female animals were also deemed unsuitable research subjects due to their fluctuating hormonal levels during the menstrual or other reproductive cycles. However, research has demonstrated significant biological differences between the sexes in rates of susceptibility, symptoms and response to treatment in many major areas of health, including heart disease and some cancers. These exclusions pose a threat to the application of evidence-based medicine to women, and compromise to care offered to both women and men.

The increasing focus on Women's Rights in the United States during the 1980s focused attention on the fact that many drugs being prescribed for women had never actually been tested in women of child-bearing potential, and that there was a relative paucity of basic research into women's health. In response to this the National Institutes of Health (NIH) created the Office of Research on Women's Health (ORWH) in 1990 to address these inequities. In 1993 the National Institutes of Health Revitalisation Act officially reversed US policy by requiring NIH funded phase III clinical trials to include women. This resulted in an increase in women recruited into research studies. The next phase was the specific funding of large scale epidemiology studies and clinical trials focussing on women's health such as the Women's Health Initiative (1991), the largest disease prevention study conducted in the US. Its role was to study the major causes of death, disability and frailty in older women. Despite this apparent progress, women remain underrepresented. In 2006 women accounted for less than 25% of clinical trials published in 2004, A follow-up study by the same authors five years later found little evidence of improvement. Another study found between 10 and 47% of women in heart disease clinical trials, despite the prevalence of heart disease in women. Lung cancer is the leading cause of cancer death amongst women, but while the number of women enrolled in lung cancer studies is increasing, they are still far less likely to be enrolled than men.

One of the challenges in assessing progress in this area is the number of clinical studies that either do not report the gender of the subjects or lack the statistical power to detect gender differences. These were still issues in 2014, and further compounded by the fact that the majority of animal studies also exclude females or fail to account for differences in sex and gender. for instance despite the higher incidence of depression amongst women, less than half of the animal studies use female animals. Consequently, a number of funding agencies and scientific journals are asking researchers to explicitly address issues of sex and gender in their research. Some countries address the underrepresentation of women in research studies by the establishment of centers of excellence focusing on women's health research and running large scale clinical trials such as the Women's Health Initiative.

A related issue is the inclusion of pregnant women in clinical studies. Since other illnesses can exist concurrently with pregnancy, information is needed on the response to and efficacy of interventions during pregnancy, but ethical issues relative to the fetus, make this more complex. This gender bias is partly offset by the initiation of large scale epidemiology studies of women, such as the Nurses' Health Study (1976), Women's Health Initiative and Black Women's Health Study.

Women have also been the subject of neglect in health care research, such as the situation revealed in the Cartwright Inquiry in New Zealand (1988), in which research by two feminist journalists revealed that women with cervical abnormalities were not receiving treatment, as part of an experiment. The women were not told of the abnormalities and several later died.

The Women's Health Care Market is today a major pharmaceutical industry, projected to double in size within the five years from 2019 to 2024 and reach USD 17.8 billion. The by far most valued company worldwide whose leading products are in Women's Health is Bayer (Germany) with the focus area of Contraception.

== National and international initiatives ==
Logo of UN Sustainable Development Goals

In addition to addressing gender inequity in research, a number of countries have made women's health the subject of national initiatives. For instance in 1991 in the United States, the Department of Health and Human Services established an Office on Women's Health (OWH) with the goal of improving the health of women in America, through coordinating the women's health agenda throughout the department, and other agencies. In the twenty first century the Office has focussed on underserviced women. Also, in 1994 the Centers for Disease Control and Prevention (CDC) established its own Office of Women's Health (OWH), which was formally authorised by the 2010 Affordable Health Care Act (ACA).

Internationally, many United Nations agencies such as the World Health Organization (WHO), United Nations Population Fund (UNFPA) and UNICEF maintain specific programs on women's health, or maternal, sexual and reproductive health. In addition the United Nations global goals address many issues related to women's health, both directly and indirectly. These include the 2000 Millennium Development Goals (MDG) and their successor, the Sustainable Development Goals adopted in September 2015, following the report on progress towards the MDGs (The Millennium Development Goals Report 2015). For instance the eight MDG goals, eradicating extreme poverty and hunger, achieving universal primary education, promoting gender equality and empowering women, reducing child mortality rates, improving maternal health, combating HIV/AIDS malaria and other diseases, ensuring environmental sustainability, and developing a global partnership for development, all impact on women's health, as do all seventeen SDG goals, in addition to the specific SDG5: Achieve gender equality and empower all women and girls.

== Goals and challenges ==
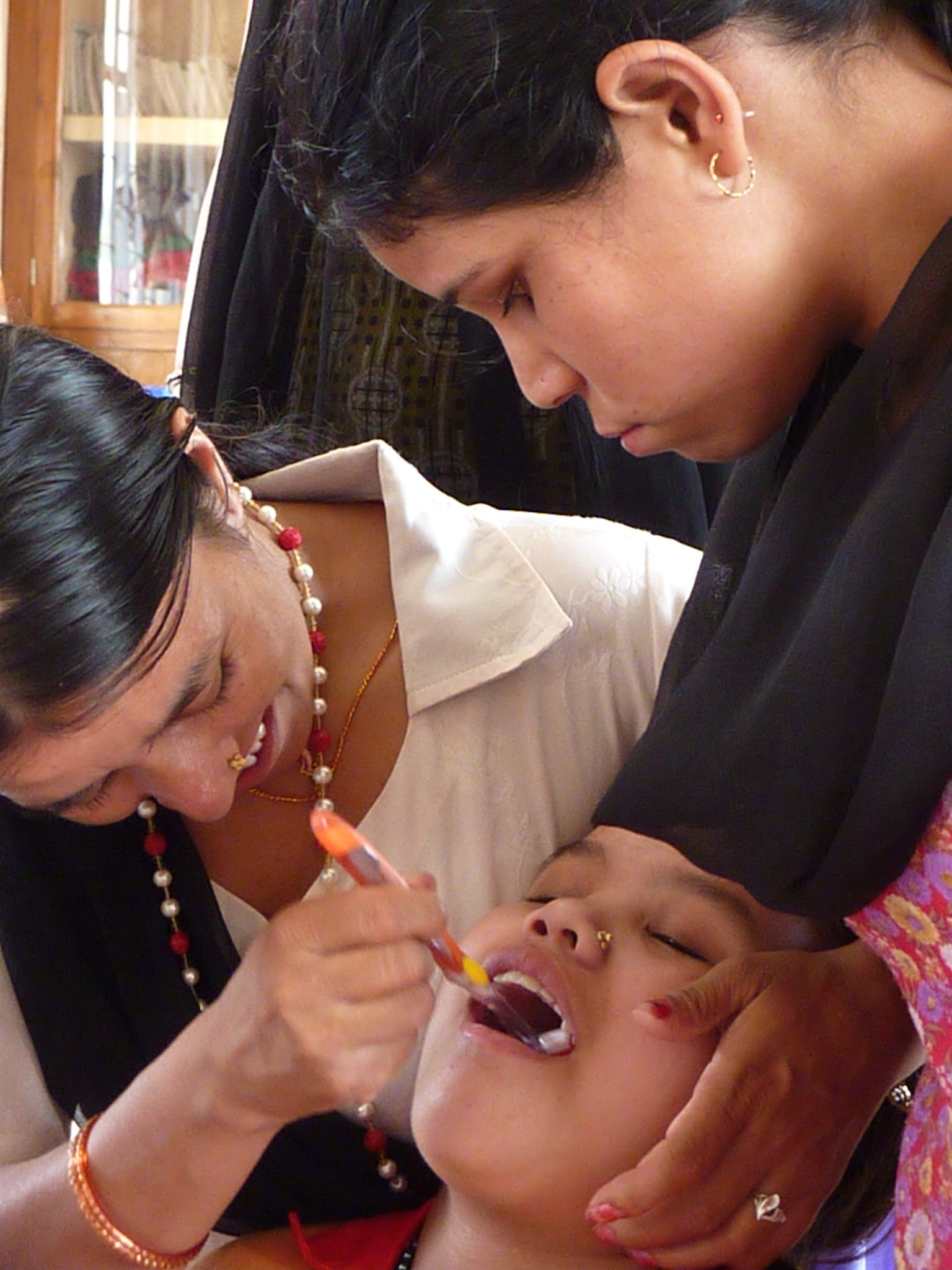
Women in Nepal learning oral health

Research is a priority in terms of improving women's health. Research needs include diseases unique to women, more serious in women and those that differ in risk factors between women and men. The balance of sex and/or gender in research studies needs to be balanced appropriately to allow analysis that will detect interactions between sex and/or gender and other factors. Gronowski and Schindler suggest that scientific journals make documentation of sex a requirement when reporting the results of animal studies, and that funding agencies require justification from investigators for any sex inequity in their grant proposals, giving preference to those that are inclusive. They also suggest it is the role of health organisations to encourage women to enroll in clinical research. However, there has been progress in terms of large scale studies such as the WHI, and in 2006 the Society for Women's Health Research founded the Organization for the Study of Sex Differences and the journal Biology of Sex Differences to further the study of sex differences.

Research findings can take some time before becoming routinely implemented into clinical practice. Clinical medicine needs to incorporate the information already available from research studies as to the different ways in which diseases affect women and men. Many "normal" laboratory values have not been properly established for the female population separately, and similarly the "normal" criteria for growth and development. Drug dosing needs to take sex differences in drug metabolism into account.

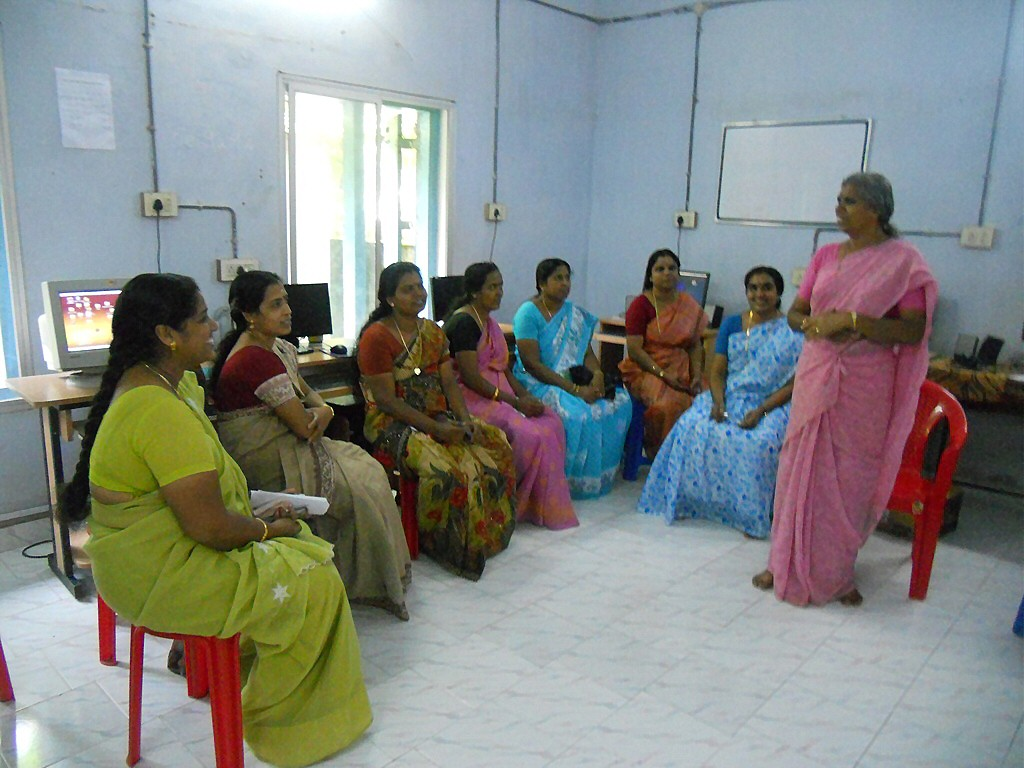
Women receiving health education in India

Globally, women's access to health care remains a challenge, both in developing and developed countries. In the United States, before the Affordable Health Care Act came into effect, 25% of women of child-bearing age lacked health insurance. In the absence of adequate insurance, women are likely to avoid important steps to self care such as routine physical examination, screening and prevention testing, and prenatal care. The situation is aggravated by the fact that women living below the poverty line are at greater risk of unplanned pregnancy, unplanned delivery and elective abortion. Added to the financial burden in this group are poor educational achievement, lack of transportation, inflexible work schedules and difficulty obtaining child care, all of which function to create barriers to accessing health care. These problems are much worse in developing countries. Under 50% of childbirths in these countries are assisted by healthcare providers (e.g. midwives, nurses, doctors) which accounts for higher rates of maternal death, up to 1:1,000 live births. This is despite the WHO setting standards, such as a minimum of four antenatal visits. A lack of healthcare providers, facilities, and resources such as formularies all contribute to high levels of morbidity amongst women from avoidable conditions such as obstetrical fistulae, sexually transmitted infections and cervical cancer.

These challenges are included in the goals of the Office of Research on Women's Health, in the United States, as is the goal of facilitating women's access to careers in biomedicine. The ORWH believes that one of the best ways to advance research in women's health is to increase the proportion of women involved in healthcare and health research, as well as assuming leadership in government, centres of higher learning, and in the private sector. This goal acknowledges the glass ceiling that women face in careers in science and in obtaining resources from grant funding to salaries and laboratory space. The National Science Foundation in the United States states that women only gain half of the doctorates awarded in science and engineering, fill only 21% of full-time professor positions in science and 5% of those in engineering, while earning only 82% of the remuneration their male colleagues make. These figures are even lower in Europe.

== See also ==
- European Institute of Women's Health
- Gynaecology
- Gender discrimination
- Health equity
- Men's health
- Reproductive Health Supplies Coalition
- Social determinants of health
- Women and smoking
- Women in medicine
- Gender bias in medical diagnosis

=== Women's health by country ===
- Women's health in China
- Women's health in Ethiopia
- Women's health in India

=== Publications ===
- Global Library of Women's Medicine
- Health Care for Women International
- Journal of Women's Health
- Our Bodies, Ourselves
- Women & Health
- Women's Health Issues

== Sources ==
This article incorporates text from a free content work. Licensed under CC BY 4.0 (license statement/permission). Text taken from The State of Food Security and Nutrition in the World 2026, Food and Agriculture Organization of the United Nations.

== Bibliography ==
=== Symposia and series ===
- "14th Bergmeyer Conference on Women's Health". Scandinavian Journal of Clinical and Laboratory Investigation. 74 (sup244): 1–94. August 2014.
- "Inclusion of women and minorities in clinical research". Academic Medicine. 69 (9). September 1994.
- "Maternal survival (5 articles)". The Lancet. 368. September–October 2006.

=== Articles ===
- Aldridge, Robert W.; Story, Alistair; Hwang, Stephen W.; Nordentoft, Merete; Luchenski, Serena A.; Hartwell, Greg; Tweed, Emily J.; Lewer, Dan; Vittal Katikireddi, Srinivasa; Hayward, Andrew C. (2017-11-10). "Morbidity and mortality in homeless individuals, prisoners, sex workers, and individuals with substance use disorders in high-income countries: a systematic review and meta-analysis". Lancet. 391 (10117): 241–250. doi:10.1016/S0140-6736(17)31869-X. ISSN 1474-547X. PMC 5803132. PMID 29137869.
- Arbyn, M.; Castellsague, X.; de Sanjose, S.; Bruni, L.; Saraiya, M.; Bray, F.; Ferlay, J. (6 April 2011). "Worldwide burden of cervical cancer in 2008". Annals of Oncology. 22 (12): 2675–2686. doi:10.1093/annonc/mdr015. PMID 21471563.
- Carnes, Molly; Morrissey, Claudia; Geller, Stacie E. (November 2008). "Women's Health and Women's Leadership in Academic Medicine: Hitting the Same Glass Ceiling?". Journal of Women's Health. 17 (9): 1453–1462. doi:10.1089/jwh.2007.0688. PMC 2586600. PMID 18954235.
- Charney, Pamela (August 2000). "Women's health: An Evolving Mosaic". Journal of General Internal Medicine. 15 (8): 600–602. doi:10.1046/j.1525-1497.2000.00623.x. PMC 1495581. PMID 10940153.
- Charney, Pamela (4 December 2001). "Coronary Artery Disease in Young Women: The Menstrual Cycle and Other Risk Factors". Annals of Internal Medicine. 135 (11): 1002–1004. doi:10.7326/0003-4819-135-11-200112040-00013. PMID 11730402. S2CID 26841205.
- Clancy, Carolyn M.; Massion, Charlea T. (14 October 1992). "American Women's Health Care. A Patchwork Quilt With Gaps". JAMA. 268 (14): 1918–1920. doi:10.1001/jama.1992.03490140126048. PMID 1404719.
- Coney, Sandra; Bunkle, Phillida (June 1987). "An Unfortunate Experiment at National Women's" (PDF). Metro. Auckland. pp. 47–65. Archived from the original (PDF) on 16 January 2020.
- Ellsberg, M. (September 2006). "Violence against women and the Millennium Development Goals: Facilitating women's access to support". International Journal of Gynecology & Obstetrics. 94 (3): 325–332. doi:10.1016/j.ijgo.2006.04.021. PMID 16842792. S2CID 1770101.
- Friedman, Arnold J.; Chen, Zhao; Ford, Patricia; Johnson, Cynda Ann; Lopez, Ana Maria; Shander, Aryeh; Waters, Jonathan H.; van Wyck, David (December 2012). "Iron Deficiency Anemia in Women Across the Life Span". Journal of Women's Health. 21 (12): 1282–1289. doi:10.1089/jwh.2012.3713. PMID 23210492.
- Gahagan, Jacqueline; Gray, Kimberly; Whynacht, Ardath (2015). "Sex and gender matter in health research: addressing health inequities in health research reporting". International Journal for Equity in Health. 14 (1): 12. doi:10.1186/s12939-015-0144-4. PMC 4320818. PMID 25637131.
- Gahagan, Jacqueline (15 August 2016). "Commentary on the new sex and gender editorial policy of the Canadian Journal of Public Health". Canadian Journal of Public Health. 107 (2): e140–1. doi:10.17269/cjph.107.5584. PMC 6972341. PMID 27526209.
- "Canadian Journal of Public Health tells researchers to address sex, gender in trials". CBC. September 7, 2016.
- García-Moreno, Claudia; Amin, Avni (1 May 2016). "The sustainable development goals, violence and women's and children's health". Bulletin of the World Health Organization. 94 (5): 396–397. doi:10.2471/blt.16.172205. PMC 4850543. PMID 27147771. Archived from the original on August 4, 2016.
- Geller, Stacie E.; Adams, Marci Goldstein; Carnes, Molly (December 2006). "Adherence to Federal Guidelines for Reporting of Sex and Race/Ethnicity in Clinical Trials". Journal of Women's Health. 15 (10): 1123–1131. doi:10.1089/jwh.2006.15.1123. PMID 17199453. S2CID 19653225.
- Geller, Stacie E.; Koch, Abby; Pellettieri, Beth; Carnes, Molly (March 2011). "Inclusion, Analysis, and Reporting of Sex and Race/Ethnicity in Clinical Trials: Have We Made Progress?". Journal of Women's Health. 20 (3): 315–320. doi:10.1089/jwh.2010.2469. PMC 3058895. PMID 21351877.
- Gronowski, Ann M.; Schindler, Emily I. (2014). "Women's Health". Scand J Clin Lab Invest Suppl. 244: 2–7. doi:10.3109/00365513.2014.936672. PMID 25083885. S2CID 46673330., in Bergmeyer (2014)
- Inhorn, Marcia C. (September 2006). "Defining Women's Health: A Dozen Messages from More than 150 Ethnographies" (PDF). Medical Anthropology Quarterly. 20 (3): 345–378. doi:10.1525/maq.2006.20.3.345. PMID 16937621.
- Kim, Esther S.H.; Carrigan, Thomas P.; Menon, Venu (August 2008). "Enrollment of Women in National Heart, Lung, and Blood Institute-Funded Cardiovascular Randomized Controlled Trials Fails to Meet Current Federal Mandates for Inclusion". Journal of the American College of Cardiology. 52 (8): 672–673. doi:10.1016/j.jacc.2008.05.025. PMID 18702973.
- Koplan, Jeffrey P; Bond, T Christopher; Merson, Michael H; Reddy, K Srinath; Rodriguez, Mario Henry; Sewankambo, Nelson K; Wasserheit, Judith N (June 2009). "Towards a common definition of global health". The Lancet. 373 (9679): 1993–1995. Bibcode:2009Lanc..373.1993K. doi:10.1016/S0140-6736(09)60332-9. PMC 9905260. PMID 19493564. S2CID 6919716.
- Kozhimannil, Katy Backes; Abraham, Jean M.; Virnig, Beth A. (March 2012). "National Trends in Health Insurance Coverage of Pregnant and Reproductive-Age Women, 2000 to 2009". Women's Health Issues. 22 (2): e135–e141. doi:10.1016/j.whi.2011.12.002. PMID 22385900.
- Liu, Katherine A.; DiPietro Mager, Natalie A. (31 March 2016). "Women's involvement in clinical trials: historical perspective and future implications". Pharmacy Practice. 14 (1): 708. doi:10.18549/PharmPract.2016.01.708. PMC 4800017. PMID 27011778.
- McCarthy, CR (1994). "Historical background of clinical trials involving women and minorities". Acad Med. 69 (9): 695–698. doi:10.1097/00001888-199409000-00002. PMID 8074757., in Academic Medicine (1994)
- Macfarlane, Sarah B; Jacobs, Marian; Kaaya, Ephata E (10 December 2008). "In the Name of Global Health: Trends in Academic Institutions". Journal of Public Health Policy. 29 (4): 383–401. doi:10.1057/jphp.2008.25. PMID 19079297. S2CID 46424271.
- Manson, JoAnn E.; Chlebowski, Rowan T.; Stefanick, Marcia L.; Aragaki, Aaron K.; Rossouw, Jacques E.; Prentice, Ross L.; Anderson, Garnet; Howard, Barbara V.; Thomson, Cynthia A.; LaCroix, Andrea Z.; Wactawski-Wende, Jean; Jackson, Rebecca D.; Limacher, Marian; Margolis, Karen L.; Wassertheil-Smoller, Sylvia; Beresford, Shirley A.; Cauley, Jane A.; Eaton, Charles B.; Gass, Margery; Hsia, Judith; Johnson, Karen C.; Kooperberg, Charles; Kuller, Lewis H.; Lewis, Cora E.; Liu, Simin; Martin, Lisa W.; Ockene, Judith K.; O'sullivan, Mary Jo; Powell, Lynda H.; Simon, Michael S.; Van Horn, Linda; Vitolins, Mara Z.; Wallace, Robert B. (2 October 2013). "Menopausal Hormone Therapy and Health Outcomes During the Intervention and Extended Poststopping Phases of the Women's Health Initiative Randomized Trials". JAMA. 310 (13): 1353–1368. doi:10.1001/jama.2013.278040. PMC 3963523. PMID 24084921.
- Marshall, N. L.; Tracy, A. J. (2009). "After the Baby: Work-Family Conflict and Working Mothers' Psychological Health". Family Relations. 58 (4): 380–391. doi:10.1111/j.1741-3729.2009.00560.x.
- Marshall, Nancy L. (2013). Employment and women's health. pp. 46–63. doi:10.13140/2.1.3227.5521. ISBN 978-0-470-89066-0., in Spiers et al (2013)
- Murray-Kolb, LE; Beard, JL (March 2007). "Iron treatment normalizes cognitive functioning in young women". American Journal of Clinical Nutrition. 85 (3): 778–87. doi:10.1093/ajcn/85.3.778. PMID 17344500.
- Norsigian, Judy (1994). "Women and National Health Care Reform: A Progressive Feminist Agenda". Reframing Women's Health: Multidisciplinary Research and Practice. SAGE Publications, Inc. pp. 111–117. doi:10.4135/9781483327099.n11. ISBN 9780803958609., in Dan (1994)
- Nour, Nawal M. (2014). "Global women's health – A global perspective". Scandinavian Journal of Clinical and Laboratory Investigation. 74: 8–12. doi:10.3109/00365513.2014.936673. PMID 25083886. S2CID 207421495., in Bergmeyer (2014)
- Pimenta, Jeanne M; Galindo, Claudia; Jenkins, David; Taylor, Sylvia M (21 November 2013). "Estimate of the global burden of cervical adenocarcinoma and potential impact of prophylactic human papillomavirus vaccination". BMC Cancer. 13 (1): 553. doi:10.1186/1471-2407-13-553. PMC 3871005. PMID 24261839.
- Pinn, VW (1994). "The role of the NIH's Office of Research on Women's Health". Acad Med. 69 (9): 698–702. doi:10.1097/00001888-199409000-00003. PMID 8074758., in Academic Medicine (1994)
- Public Health Service Task Force on Women's Health Issues (January–February 1985). "Women's health. Report of the Public Health Service Task Force on Women's Health Issues". Public Health Reports. 100 (1): 73–106. PMC 1424718. PMID 3918328.
- Royal Thai College of Obstetricians and Gynaecologists; JHPIEGO Corporation Cervical Cancer Prevention Group (March 2003). "Safety, acceptability, and feasibility of a single-visit approach to cervical-cancer prevention in rural Thailand: a demonstration project". The Lancet. 361 (9360): 814–820. doi:10.1016/S0140-6736(03)12707-9. PMID 12642047. S2CID 25836884.
- Schiebinger, Londa (1 October 2003). "Women's health and clinical trials". Journal of Clinical Investigation. 112 (7): 973–977. doi:10.1172/JCI19993. PMC 198535. PMID 14523031.
- Shen, Helen (6 March 2013). "Inequality quantified: Mind the gender gap". Nature. 495 (7439): 22–24. Bibcode:2013Natur.495...22S. doi:10.1038/495022a. PMID 23467149.
- Siegel, Rebecca; Naishadham, Deepa; Jemal, Ahmedin (January 2012). "Cancer statistics, 2012". CA: A Cancer Journal for Clinicians. 62 (1): 10–29. doi:10.3322/caac.20138. PMID 22237781. S2CID 17068226.
- Siegel, Rebecca L.; Miller, Kimberly D.; Jemal, Ahmedin (January 2016). "Cancer statistics, 2016". CA: A Cancer Journal for Clinicians. 66 (1): 7–30. doi:10.3322/caac.21332. hdl:11285/636256. PMID 26742998.
- Stevens, Gretchen A; Mathers, Colin D; Beard, John R (1 September 2013). "Global mortality trends and patterns in older women". Bulletin of the World Health Organization. 91 (9): 630–639. doi:10.2471/BLT.12.109710. PMC 3790210. PMID 24101779.
- Turshen, Meredeth; Koblinsky, Marge; Timyan, Judith; Gay, Jill (December 1994). "The Health of Women: A Global Perspective". Journal of Public Health Policy. 14 (3): 366. doi:10.2307/3343047. JSTOR 3343047. S2CID 71078396.
- Vickers, M. R; MacLennan, A. H; Lawton, B.; Ford, D.; Martin, J.; Meredith, S. K; DeStavola, B. L; Rose, S.; Dowell, A.; Wilkes, H. C; Darbyshire, J. H; Meade, T. W (4 August 2007). "Main morbidities recorded in the women's international study of long duration oestrogen after menopause (WISDOM): a randomised controlled trial of hormone replacement therapy in postmenopausal women". BMJ. 335 (7613): 239. doi:10.1136/bmj.39266.425069.AD. PMC 1939792. PMID 17626056.
- Watts, Charlotte; Zimmerman, Cathy (April 2002). "Violence against women: global scope and magnitude". The Lancet. 359 (9313): 1232–1237. doi:10.1016/S0140-6736(02)08221-1. PMID 11955557. S2CID 38436965.
- Young, Ian S. (2014). "Foreword". Scandinavian Journal of Clinical and Laboratory Investigation. 74: 1. doi:10.3109/00365513.2014.936671. PMID 25083884. S2CID 42459769., in Bergmeyer (2014)

==== Reproductive and sexual health ====
- Aedy, Thomas (12 April 2016). "Ending child marriage: can we achieve this SDG?". Development Progress. Archived from the original on 1 November 2016., in Development Progress (2016)
- Bruinvels, G; Burden, R J; McGregor, A J; Ackerman, K E; Dooley, M; Richards, T; Pedlar, C (6 June 2016). "Sport, exercise and the menstrual cycle: where is the research?" (PDF). British Journal of Sports Medicine. 51 (6): bjsports–2016–096279. doi:10.1136/bjsports-2016-096279. PMID 27267895. S2CID 46472816.
- Chandra, A; Copen, CE; Stephen, EH (14 August 2013). "Infertility and impaired fecundity in the United States, 1982–2010: data from the National Survey of Family Growth" (PDF). National Health Statistics Reports (67): 1–18, 1 p following 19. PMID 24988820.
- Darroch, Jacqueline E; Singh, Susheela (May 2013). "Trends in contraceptive need and use in developing countries in 2003, 2008, and 2012: an analysis of national surveys". The Lancet. 381 (9879): 1756–1762. doi:10.1016/S0140-6736(13)60597-8. PMID 23683642. S2CID 8257042.
- Forman, David; de Martel, Catherine; Lacey, Charles J.; Soerjomataram, Isabelle; Lortet-Tieulent, Joannie; Bruni, Laia; Vignat, Jerome; Ferlay, Jacques; Bray, Freddie; Plummer, Martyn; Franceschi, Silvia (November 2012). "Global Burden of Human Papillomavirus and Related Diseases". Vaccine. 30: F12–F23. doi:10.1016/j.vaccine.2012.07.055. PMID 23199955. S2CID 30694437.
- Ganatra, Bela; Tunçalp, Özge; Johnston, Heidi Bart; Johnson Jr, Brooke R; Gülmezoglu, Ahmet Metin; Temmerman, Marleen (1 March 2014). "From concept to measurement: operationalizing WHO's definition of unsafe abortion". Bulletin of the World Health Organization. 92 (3): 155. doi:10.2471/BLT.14.136333. PMC 3949603. PMID 24700971.
- Nour, NM (April 2004). "Female genital cutting: clinical and cultural guidelines". Obstetrical & Gynecological Survey. 59 (4): 272–279. doi:10.1097/01.ogx.0000118939.19371.af. PMID 15024227. S2CID 37097252.
- Nour, Nawal (2006). "Health Consequences of Child Marriage in Africa". Emerging Infectious Diseases. 12 (11): 1644–1649. doi:10.3201/eid1211.060510. PMC 3372345. PMID 17283612.
- Nour, Nawal M.; Michels, Karin B.; Bryant, Ann E. (July 2006). "Defibulation to Treat Female Genital Cutting". Obstetrics & Gynecology. 108 (1): 55–60. doi:10.1097/01.AOG.0000224613.72892.77. PMID 16816056. S2CID 1780433.
- Peterson, Herbert B; Darmstadt, Gary L; Bongaarts, John (May 2013). "Meeting the unmet need for family planning: now is the time". The Lancet. 381 (9879): 1696–1699. doi:10.1016/S0140-6736(13)60999-X. PMID 23683620. S2CID 33988391.
- Sedgh, Gilda; Bearak, Jonathan; Singh, Susheela; Bankole, Akinrinola; Popinchalk, Anna; Ganatra, Bela; Rossier, Clémentine; Gerdts, Caitlin; Tunçalp, Özge; Johnson, Brooke Ronald; Johnston, Heidi Bart; Alkema, Leontine (July 2016). "Abortion incidence between 1990 and 2014: global, regional, and subregional levels and trends". The Lancet. 388 (10041): 258–267. doi:10.1016/S0140-6736(16)30380-4. PMC 5498988. PMID 27179755.
- Sunderam, Saswati; Kissin, Dmitry M.; Crawford, Sara B.; Folger, Suzanne G.; Jamieson, Denise J.; Warner, Lee; Barfield, Wanda D. (4 December 2015). "Assisted Reproductive Technology Surveillance — United States, 2013". MMWR. Surveillance Summaries. 64 (11): 1–25. doi:10.15585/mmwr.ss6411a1. PMC 5829717. PMID 26633040.
- Sunderam, Saswati; Kissin, Dmitry M.; Crawford, Sara B.; Folger, Suzanne G.; Jamieson, Denise J.; Warner, Lee; Barfield, Wanda D. (6 December 2013). "Assisted Reproductive Technology Surveillance — United States, 2010". MMWR. Surveillance Summaries. 62 (9): 1–24. PMID 24304902.

==== Maternal health ====
- Filippi, Véronique; Ronsmans, Carine; Campbell, Oona MR; Graham, Wendy J; Mills, Anne; Borghi, Jo; Koblinsky, Marjorie; Osrin, David (October 2006). "Maternal health in poor countries: the broader context and a call for action". The Lancet. 368 (9546): 1535–1541. doi:10.1016/S0140-6736(06)69384-7. PMID 17071287. S2CID 31036096.
- Hansen, Christian Holm; Schellenberg, Joanna R M Armstrong (January 2016). "Modest global achievements in maternal survival: more focus on sub-Saharan Africa is needed" (PDF). The Lancet. 387 (10017): 410–411. doi:10.1016/S0140-6736(16)00099-4. PMID 26869551. S2CID 205980332.
- Joint Commission (26 January 2010). "Preventing maternal death" (PDF). Sentinel Event Alert (44). Archived from the original (PDF) on 10 May 2017.
- Rosenfield, Allan; Maine, Deborah; Freedman, Lynn (September 2006). "Meeting MDG-5: an impossible dream?". The Lancet. 368 (9542): 1133–1135. doi:10.1016/S0140-6736(06)69386-0. PMID 17011925. S2CID 12109602.
- Say, Lale; Chou, Doris; Gemmill, Alison; Tunçalp, Özge; Moller, Ann-Beth; Daniels, Jane; Gülmezoglu, A Metin; Temmerman, Marleen; Alkema, Leontine (June 2014). "Global causes of maternal death: a WHO systematic analysis". The Lancet Global Health. 2 (6): e323–e333. Bibcode:2014LanGH...2.e323S. doi:10.1016/S2214-109X(14)70227-X. hdl:1854/LU-5796925. PMID 25103301.

=== Books ===
- Barmak, Sarah (2016). Closer: Notes from the Orgasmic Frontier of Female Sexuality. Toronto: Coach. ISBN 9781552453230. Archived from the original on 2016-08-11.
- Boyd-Judson, Lyn; James, Patrick, eds. (2014). Women's global health norms and state policies. Lanham: Lexington Books. ISBN 9780739188897.
- Crowell, Nancy A.; Burgess, Ann W., eds. (1996). Understanding Violence Against Women. DC: National Academies Press. Bibcode:1996nap..book.5127N. doi:10.17226/5127. ISBN 9780309588812.
- Dan, Alice J., ed. (1994). Reframing women's health multidisciplinary research and practice. Thousand Oaks, CA: Sage Publications. ISBN 9781452255200.
- Grant, Nicole J. (1992). The Selling of contraception : the Dalkon Shield case, sexuality, and women's autonomy. Columbus: Ohio State University Press. ISBN 978-0814205723.
- Hart, Tanya (2015). Health in the City: Race, Poverty, and the Negotiation of Women's Health in New York City, 1915–1930. NYU Press. ISBN 9781479873067.
- Koblinsky, Marje; Timyan, Judith; Gay, Jill, eds. (1993). The health of women: a global perspective. Boulder, San Francisco: Westview Press. ISBN 9780813316086.
- Lewis, Judith A.; Bernstein, Judith (1996). Women's Health: A Relational Perspective Across the Life Cycle. Sudbury, Mass.: Jones & Bartlett Learning. ISBN 9780867204858.
- Loue, Sana; Sajatovic, Martha, eds. (2004). Encyclopedia of woment's health. New York: Kluwer Academic/Plenum Publishers. ISBN 9780306480737.
- Nelson, Jennifer (2015). More Than Medicine: A History of the Feminist Women's Health Movement. New York University Press. ISBN 978-0-8147-6290-5.
- Pringle, Rosemary (1998). Sex and medicine: gender, power and authority in the medical profession. Cambridge: Cambridge Univ. Press. ISBN 9780521578127.
- Regitz-Zagrosek, Vera, ed. (2012). Sex and gender differences in pharmacology. Berlin: Springer. ISBN 9783642307256.
- Senie, Ruby T., ed. (2014). Epidemiology of women's health. Burlington, MA: Jones & Bartlett Learning. ISBN 9780763769857.
- Spiers, Mary V.; Geller, Pamela A.; Kloss, Jacqueline D., eds. (2013). Women's Health Psychology. Hoboken, NJ: Wiley. ISBN 9781118415511.
- Seaman, Barbara; Eldridge, Laura (2008). The No-Nonsense Guide to Menopause. New York: Simon and Schuster. ISBN 9781416564836.
- Stevens, Joyce (1995). Healing women: a history of Leichhardt Women's Community Health Centre. Leichhardt, N.S.W.: First Ten Years History Project. ISBN 978-0646259772.
- Wolf, Naomi (2012). Vagina: a new biography. New York, New York: Ecco. ISBN 9780061989162.
- Young, Iris (2000). Inclusion and democracy. Oxford New York: Oxford University Press. ISBN 9780198297550.

==== Chapters ====
- Galea, Sandro (2014). Foreword. Jones & Bartlett Publishers. pp. ix–x. ISBN 9780763769857., in Senie (2014)
- Rosenthal, Miriam B. (2004). "Depression". Encyclopedia of Women's Health. pp. 358–360. doi:10.1007/978-0-306-48113-0_120. ISBN 978-0-306-48073-7., in Loue & Sajatovic (2004)
- Stebbins, Tira B. (2004). "Mental Illness". Encyclopedia of Women's Health. pp. 820–822. doi:10.1007/978-0-306-48113-0_274. ISBN 978-0-306-48073-7., in Loue & Sajatovic (2004)
- Varia, Nisha (2016-01-05). Ending Child Mariage: Meeting the Global Development Goals' Promise to Girls. pp. 33–40., in World Report (2016)

=== Reports and documents ===
- Action Plan for Women's Health. US Public Health Service Office on Women's Health. 2004. ISBN 9780788117893.
- Cartwright, Silvia (5 August 1988). The Report of the Committee of Inquiry into Allegations Concerning the Treatment of Cervical Cancer at National Women's Hospital and into Other Related Matters. Auckland: Government Printing Office. ISBN 978-0-473-00664-8.
- Committee on Women's Health Research, Institute of Medicine (2010). Women's Health Research: Progress, Pitfalls, and Promise. Washington DC: National Academies Press. ISBN 9780309153898.
- Johnson, Paula A.; Therese Fitzgerald, Therese; Salganicoff, Alina; Wood, Susan F.; Goldstein, Jill M. (3 March 2014). Sex-Specific Medical Research Why Women's Health Can't Wait: A Report of the Mary Horrigan Connors Center for Women's Health & Gender Biology at Brigham and Women's Hospital (PDF). Boston MA: Mary Horrigan Connors Center for Women's Health & Gender Biology.
- Office of the Surgeon General (2004). Bone Health and Osteoporosis: A Report of the Surgeon General. Rockville, MD: U.S. Department of Health and Human Services. PMID 20945569.
- Presler-Marshall, Elizabeth; Jones, Nicola (June 2012). Charting the future: empowering girls to prevent early pregnancy (PDF). London: Overseas Development Institute Save the Children. Archived from the original (PDF) on 2015-07-01.
- Singh, Susheela; Darroch, Jacqueline E. (June 2012). Adding It Up: Costs and Benefits of Contraceptive Services Estimates for 2012 (PDF). NY: Guttmacher Institute UNFPA.
- Woman, Indonesia. (June 2021). Mengapa Bisa Terjadi Serangan Jantung Pasca Pasang Ring?. ID.
- Wood, Susan F.; Dor, Avi; Gee, Rebekah E.; Harms, Alison; Mauery, D. Richard; Rosenbaum, Sara J.; Tan, Ellen (15 June 2009). Women's health and health care reform: the economic burden of disease in women'. Washington DC: George Washington University, School of Public Health and Health Services, Jacobs Institute of Women's Health.
- World Report 2016 (PDF). New York: Human Rights Watch. 2016. ISBN 978-1-60980-702-3.

==== United Nations reports ====
- Biddlecom, Ann; Kantorová, Vladimíra; Kisambira, Stephen; Nahmias, Petra; Rafalimanana, Hantamalala (2015). Trends in Contraceptive Use Worldwide 2015 (PDF). New York: Department of Economic and Social Affairs, United Nations. ISBN 978-92-1-057775-5.
- Blum, Robert W; Gates, William H (2015). Girlhood, Not Motherhood: Preventing Adolescent Pregnancy (PDF). UNFPA. ISBN 978-0-89714-986-0.
- Garcia-Moreno, Claudia; Guedes, Alessandra; Knerr, Wendy (2012). Understanding and addressing violence against women (PDF). WHO PAHO.
- García-Moreno, Claudia; Pallitto, Christina; Devries, Karen; Stöckl, Heidi; Watts, Charlotte; Abrahams, Naeemah (2013). Global and regional estimates of violence against women prevalence and health effects of intimate partner violence and non-partner sexual violence (PDF). Geneva: WHO LSHTM SAMRC. ISBN 978-92-4-156462-5.
- Ibañez, Ximena Andión; Phillips, Suzannah; Fine, Johanna; Shoranick, Tammy (2010). The right to contraceptive information and services for women and adolescents (PDF). Center for Reproductive Rights UNFPA.
- Jones, Debra A (2007). Living Testimony: Obstetric Fistula and Inequities in Maternal Health (PDF). UNFPA.
- Krug, Etienne G.; Dahlberg, Linda L.; Mercy, James A.; Zwi, Anthony B.; Lozano, Rafael, eds. (2002). The World report on violence and health. Geneva: WHO. ISBN 978-92-4-154561-7.
- Ricardo, Christine; Verani, Fabio (2010). Engaging Men and Boys in Gender Equality and Health: A global toolkit for action. UNFPA. ISBN 978-0-89714-909-9.
- Stewart, BW; Wild, CP, eds. (2014). World Cancer Report 2014. Lyon: IARC WHO. ISBN 978-92-832-0443-5. Archived from the original on 2018-06-18.
- UN (20 December 1993). Declaration on the Elimination of Violence against Women. 48/104 (PDF). United Nations General Assembly.
- UN (8 September 2000). United Nations Millennium Declaration. 55/2. United Nations General Assembly.
- UN (2015). The Millennium Development Goals Report 2015 (PDF). New York: United Nations.
- UN (2015a). Millennium Development Goal 3: Promote gender equality and empower women (PDF). New York: United Nations.
- UN (2015b). Millennium Development Goal 5: Improve maternal health (PDF). New York: United Nations.
- WHA (May 1996). Prevention of violence: a public health priority WHA49.25 (PDF). Geneva: WHO.
- WHO (July 1997). Violence against women: Definition and scope of the problem (PDF).
- WHO (2005a). Addressing violence against women and achieving the Millennium Development Goals (PDF). Geneva: WHO: Department of Gender, Women and Health.
- WHO (2005b). The World Health Report 2005: Make every mother and child count. Geneva: WHO. ISBN 92-4-156290-0. Archived from the original on April 13, 2005.
- WHO (2014). Trends in maternal mortality: 1990 to 2013 (PDF). WHO. ISBN 978-92-4-150722-6.
- WHO (August 2016a). Child, early and forced marriage legislation in 37 Asia-Pacific countries (PDF). WHO IPU. ISBN 978-92-4-156504-2.

=== Websites ===
- McGregor, Alyson (September 2014). "Why medicine often has dangerous side effects for women". TED: Ideas worth spreading. Sapling Foundation.
- Saslow, Debbie (30 January 2013). "Cervical Cancer is an International Issue". American Cancer Society. Archived from the original on 17 April 2018.
- Arulkumaran, Sabaratnam (ed.). "GLOWM: The Global Library of Women's Medicine". International Federation of Gynecology and Obstetrics (FIGO).
- NLM (2015). "Women's Health". Medical Subject Headings (MeSH). Archived from the original on October 10, 2015.
- "The global NCD epidemic: shifting the definition of women's health and development". GHD. Global Health and Diplomacy. 2014.

==== News ====
- Barlow, Rich (28 March 2014). "Why Medical Research Often Ignores Women". BU Today. Boston University.
- Belluz, Julia (7 November 2016). "Want to improve the health of women? Electing a female leader helps". Vox.
- MacEachron, Allison (July 2014). "Women's Health in the Post – 2015 World: Ensuring No One is Left Behind" (PDF). BCUN News. Business Council for the United Nations. Archived from the original (PDF) on 11 August 2016.
- Paquette, Danielle (22 October 2016). "Why your daughter may never need to buy a tampon". Washington Post.
- Rogers, Katie (18 October 2016). "How to stop your period". New York Times.
- Roussy, Kas (6 June 2016). "Women's period seen as barrier to medical research: 'Women are not just men with boobs and tubes,' researcher says". Canadian Broadcasting Corporation.
- Roy, Eleanor Ainge (30 July 2016). "New Zealand schoolgirls skip class because they can't afford sanitary items". The Guardian.
- Rubli, Sabrina (12 December 2014). "How Menstrual Cups Are Changing Lives in East Africa". The Huffington Post.

==== Women's health research ====
- "Black Women's Health Study". Boston University Sloane Epidemiology Centre.
- "Jacobs Institute of Women's Health". Milken Institute School of Public Health.
- "Nurses' Health Study". Harvard School of Public Health. 2016.
- "Office of Research on Women's Health (ORWH)". National Institutes of Health. 2016.
- "Women's Health Initiative". National Heart, Lung and Blood Institute. 2010.
- "Society for Women's Health Research". 2016.
- "Women's Health Research Institute". Northwestern University. Archived from the original on 17 July 2019.

==== Organizations ====
- "The American Congress of Obstetricians and Gynecologists". 2016. see American Congress of Obstetricians and Gynecologists
- "Ending female genital mutilation to promote the achievement of the millennium development goals" (PDF). Amnesty International. 2010.
- "Child marriage facts and figures". International Center for Research on Women. 2015. Archived from the original on 28 August 2018.
- "Girl Summit 2014". UK Department of International Development. 2014.
- "Office on Women's Health". US Department of Health and Human Services. 2012.
  - "Girl Summit 2014". 2014.
- "Girls not Brides". 2016.
- "ICRW". International Center for Research on Women. 2015.
- "Human Rights Watch". 2016. see Human Rights Watch
- "Development Progress". Archived from the original on 30 November 2016.
- "Overseas Development Institute".
- "Save the Children". 2016. see Save the Children
- "Women's Health Action". New Zealand. 2014.

===== Women's health providers =====
- "Ciel Benedetto: A History of the Santa Cruz Women's Health Center, 1985–2000". University of California Santa Cruz. 2016. Archived from the original on 13 December 2019.
- "Leichhardt Women's Community Health Centre". 2016. Archived from the original on 28 February 2019.
- "Shenandoah Women's Healthcare, Harrisonburg VA".

===== United Nations Web sites =====
- "United Nations".
- "Millennium Development Goals and Beyond 2015". United Nations.
- "Sustainable Development Goals". United Nations.
- CSW (2013). "Agreed conclusions: The elimination and prevention of all forms of violence against women and girls" (PDF). ECOSOC UN Women. Archived from the original (PDF) on 14 March 2020.
- CSW (2016). "Commission on the Status of Women". ECOSOC UN Women.
- ECOSOC. "United Nations Economic and Social Council". United Nations.
- OHCHR (2016). "Office of the United Nations High Commissioner for Human Rights". United Nations.
- UNDESA (2016). "UN Department of Economic and Social Affairs". United Nations.
- UNFPA (2016). "United Nations Population Fund". United Nations.
- UNFPA (February 2016a). "Facing the Facts: Adolescent girls and contraception". United Nations Population Fund.
- UNICEF (2016). "United Nations Children's Emergency Fund". United Nations.
- UN Women (2016b). "United Nations Entity for Gender Equality and the Empowerment of Women". United Nations.
- UN Women (2016c). "The Facts: Violence against Women & Millennium Development Goals" (PDF). Archived from the original (PDF) on 11 January 2020.
- UN Women (January 2016a). "Flagship Programme: Prevention and access to essential services to end violence against women". Archived from the original (PDF) on 2020-03-14.

====== WHO ======
- WHO (2016). "World Health Organization".
  - WHO (1948). "WHO definition of Health". Archived from the original (Preamble to the Constitution of the World Health Organization as adopted by the International Health Conference, New York, 19–22 June 1946; signed on 22 July 1946 by the representatives of 61 States (Official Records of the World Health Organization, no. 2, p. 100) and entered into force on 7 April 1948.) on 7 July 2016., in WHO (2016)
  - WHO (2016b). "Women's health".
  - WHO (2016c). "Sexual and reproductive health".
  - WHO (2016d). "Health worker roles in providing safe abortion care and post-abortion contraception".
  - PMNCH (5 September 2014). "UN passes historic resolution on ending child marriage". The Partnership for Maternal, Newborn & Child Health (PMNCH). WHO UN.
  - Bustreo, Flavia (8 March 2015). "Ten top issues for women's health". Promoting health through the life-course. WHO.
  - IARC (2016). "International Agency for Research on Cancer". WHO.

===== CDC =====
- CDC (2016). "Centers for Disease Control". U.S. Department of Health & Human Services.
  - CDC (2016g). "Morbidity and Mortality Weekly Report (MMWR)"., in CDC (2016)
  - CDC (2012). "Osteoporosis or Low Bone Mass at the Femur Neck or Lumbar Spine in Older Adults: United States, 2005–2008"., in CDC (2016)
