= Paranasal sinus and nasal cavity cancer =

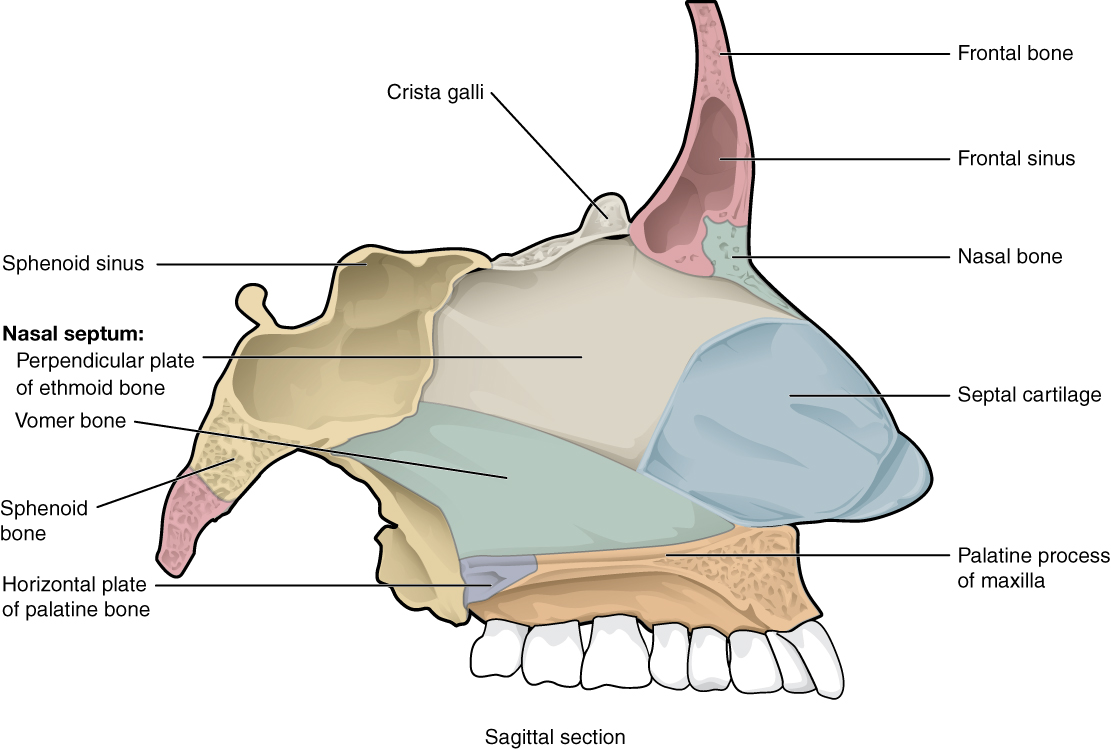
- Diagram of nasal cavity
- Specialty: Oncology
- Symptoms: Nose bleeds, Headaches, Blocked sinus, Diplopia,
- Risk factors: Exposure to wood dust or nickel dust, and leather, Tobacco use, Alcohol Consumption，
- Diagnostic method: Head and neck X-ray, Computed Tomography Scan, Magnetic resonance imaging, Physical examination
- Treatment: Surgery, Radiation Therapy, Chemotherapy, Neck dissection

Paranasal sinus and nasal cavity cancer is a type of cancer that is caused by the appearance and spread of malignant cells into the paranasal sinus and nasal cavity. The cancer most commonly occurs in people between 50 and 70 years old, and occurs twice as often in males as in females. During early phases of the cancer, symptoms may include nasal obstruction and hyposmia, as well as other symptoms. More symptoms may develop as malignant cells further grow and spread into other nearby tissue such as the palate or orbital floor. X-rays of the head and MRI can aid in diagnosis of the cancer while tumor resection surgery, radiation therapy and chemotherapy can be used for treatment of the cancer.

== Signs and symptoms ==
Paranasal sinuses

People with early stage nasal cavity or paranasal sinus cancer often do not show any symptoms, therefore, these types of cancer are usually diagnosed in the later stages. Nasal cavity or paranasal sinus cancer is often discovered when a person is being treated for a seemingly benign, inflammatory disease of the sinuses, such as sinusitis. The signs and symptoms of later stage cancer are generally caused by the spread of malignant cells into the neighbouring structures of the paranasal sinus and nasal cavity. There are often no obvious signs and symptoms before tumor cells spread into bone tissue. During the progress of the cancer, the overall signs and symptoms may include sinus pressure and pain, blocked sinus, headaches, nosebleeds, pain and pressure in the ears, among other symptoms. Different symptoms may appear as the tumor starts to spread into other body structures. Symptoms such as proptosis, diplopia and other eye problems may appear if the tumor spreads into the orbit. Symptoms such as trismus (lockjaw), facial swelling, toothache, mid-face or jaw numbness may occur if the tumor spreads into the infratemporal fossa, pterygopalatine fossae or masseteric space. The spread of the cancer into the cranial cavity may lead to headaches, nerve damage, and cerebrospinal fluid leak.

== Risk factors ==
=== Cigarettes and tobacco products ===
Cigarette smoking is strongly related to the risk of developing nasal cancer. Smokers have an excess 20% risk of developing nasal cancer.[2] There is a positive relationship between the quantity of cigarettes smoked and time period of smoking, and an increased risk of developing nasal cancer. Quitting smoking decreases the risk. There is also a positive relationship between having a spouse that smokes and developing nasal cancer.[2]

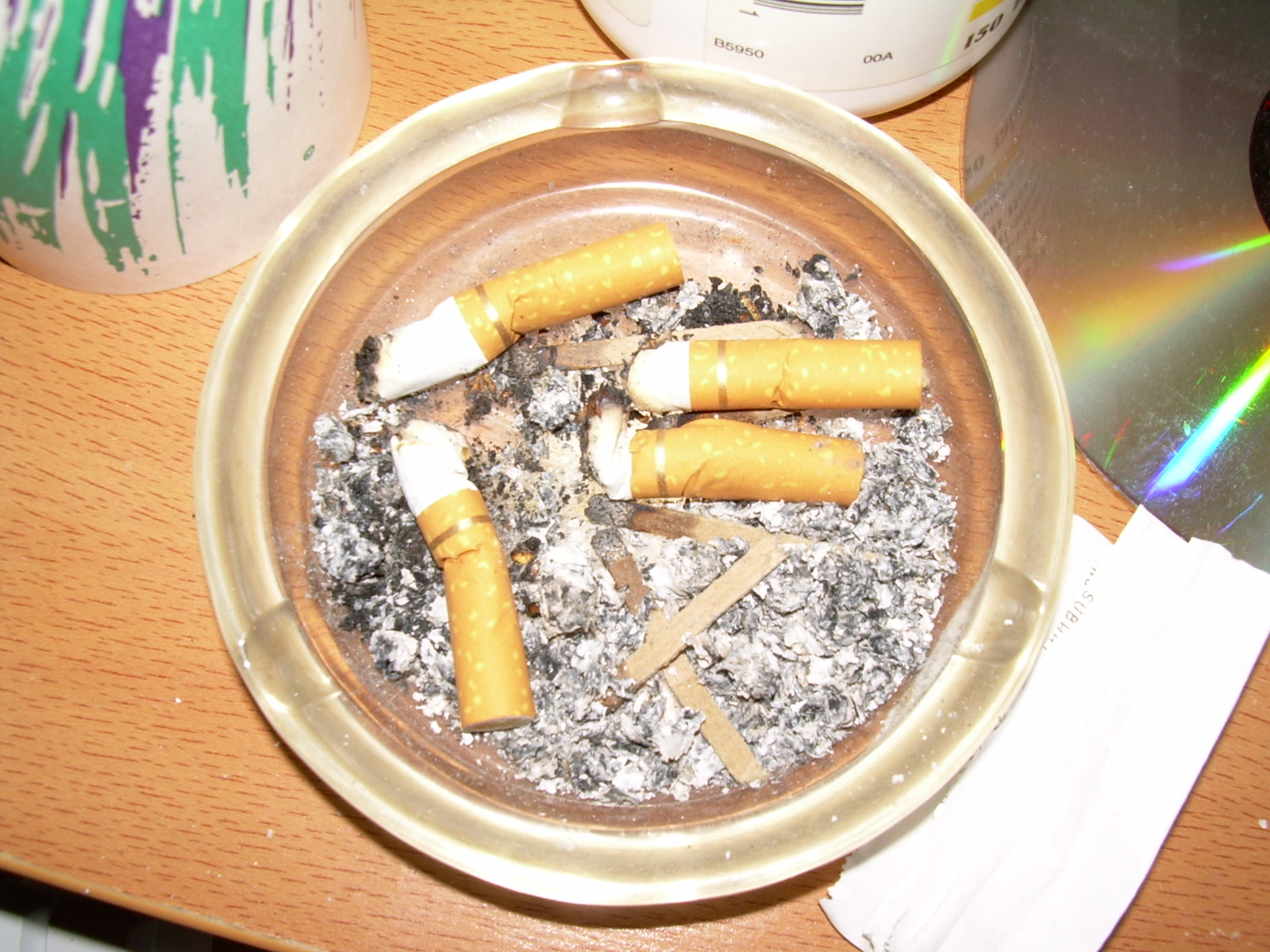
Smoking is strongly related to paranasal sinus and nasal cavity cancer

Direct contact of tobacco powder with the gums and the mucous membranes of the mouth can largely increase the risk of developing nasal or paranasal sinus cancer.

=== Environmental factors ===
Environmental factors are likely one of the main causes of paranasal sinus and nasal cavity cancer.[2] Exposure to wood dust and nickel dust may cause paranasal sinus and nasal cavity tumors. Exposure to radium fumes, formaldehyde fumes and other substances used in the production of leather and other textiles may also increase the risk. Exposure to air pollution may also increase the risk of getting the cancer.

=== Other Factors ===
Alcohol consumption may increase the risk of cancer.[2] There is no evidence that alcohol increases the risk of any specific histological type of paranasal sinus and nasal cavity cancer. Consumption of large amounts of salted and smoked food may also increase the risk of developing paranasal sinus and nasal cavity cancer.[2] Human papillomavirus infection is likely a major cause of paranasal sinus and nasal cavity cancer. Other chronic nasal conditions may also increase the risk.

== Diagnosis ==
=== Physical examination ===
Physical examination can performed to find physical signs of cancer such as swollen lymph nodes, lumps, or other abnormalities. Past medical records can also provide essential information for diagnosis. There are no blood or urine tests that can diagnose paranasal sinus and nasal cavity cancer.

=== X-rays CT scan, and MRI ===
X-rays can be used to identify abnormalities in the patient's sinus. MRI technology is typically a more efficient method to identify a tumor located in soft tissue and fluid, while CT scans serve to detect damage to bone tissue, especially in the cribriform plate.

=== Biopsy ===
A biopsy can be used to examine an excised sample of tissue with the help of a microscope. Biopsy results often determine the final diagnosis of paranasal sinus and nasal cavity cancer.

=== Bone scan ===
When used for diagnosing paranasal sinus and nasal cancer, the main goal of a bone scan is to investigate whether the cancer cells have spread into the bone.

=== Nasoscopy ===
A nasoscopy is a type of endoscopy that can be used as a diagnosis method for paranasal sinus and nasal cavity cancer. A nasoscopy is performed by the insertion of a nasoscope into the patient’s nose to search for abnormal areas in the nasal cavity. The tissue may be extracted with tools attached to the nasoscope and later examined with a microscope for signs of cancer.

=== Other diagnosis methods ===
A PET scan can also be implemented to detect cancer cells inside the body.

== Treatment ==
Various treatments can be implemented to treat paranasal sinus and nasal cavity cancer. Generally, treatment uses methods such as surgery, radiation therapy, chemotherapy and proton therapy.

=== Surgery ===
Surgery is often implemented in all stages of paranasal sinus and nasal cavity cancer. The main goal of surgery is to remove cancerous tissue. Surgery is typically followed by chemotherapy and radiation therapy, to kill off any remaining cancer cells.

The type of surgery performed depends on the extent to which cancerous tissue has spread. If the cancer has significantly spread into neighboring structures, large portions of tissue may have to be removed. If necessary, a maxillectomy could be used to remove all or part of the maxilla, which includes the hard palate. More extensive craniofacial surgery can be also used in the treatment of paranasal sinus and nasal cavity cancer, with more extensive tissue removal. The vacancy created by the removal of tissue can be filled by prostheses or soft tissue.

If the cancer may have spread to the neck, a neck dissection might be performed in order to remove the lymph nodes in the neck area, in order to remove any cancerous cells there.

=== Radiation therapy ===
Radiation therapy aims to destroy cancer cells by using high energy radiation. Radiation therapy is an effective method for paranasal sinus and nasal cavity cancer after implementation of surgery. Radiation therapy can also be used as an alternative method for a patient who is unable to undergo surgery. For paranasal sinus and nasal cavity cancer, Volumetric Modulated Arc Therapy (VMAT) more consistently and accurately irradiated the target area than Intensity Modulated Radiation Therapy (IMRT). Tooth decay may be caused by radiation therapy. Tooth decay from radiation therapy may can be prevented by receiving dental treatment before radiation therapy. Radiation therapy may cause skin redness and irritation.

=== Chemotherapy ===
Chemotherapy is usually used before or after surgery or radiation therapy. Chemotherapy can be used in the treatment of paranasal sinus and nasal cavity cancer. Infections and hair loss might occur after the implementation of chemotherapy.

== See also ==
- Head and neck cancer
- Paranasal sinus
- Nasal cavity
