= Osteoradionecrosis =

Acute form of osteomyelitis

Osteoradionecrosis (ORN) is a serious complication of radiation therapy in cancer treatment where radiated bone becomes necrotic and exposed. ORN occurs most commonly in the mouth during the treatment of head and neck cancer, and can arise over 5 years after radiation. Common signs and symptoms include pain, difficulty chewing, trismus, mouth-to-skin fistulas and non-healing ulcers.

The pathophysiology of ORN is fairly complex and involves drastic changes to bone tissue as a result of DNA damage and cell death caused by radiation treatment. Radiation therapy targeting tumor cells can affect normal cells as well, which can result in the death of bone tissue. Advances in radiation therapy have decreased the incidence of ORN, estimated at around 2%. Certain risk factors including the size and location of tumor, history of smoking or diabetes, and presence of dental disease can affect the chances of developing ORN.

Osteoradionecrosis is difficult to prevent and treat. Current prevention strategies are aimed at avoiding excess doses of radiation as well as maintaining excellent dental hygiene. Treatments are variable depending on the provider and disease severity, and can range from medical treatment with antibiotics to hyperbaric oxygen therapy (HBO) to surgical debridement or reconstruction.

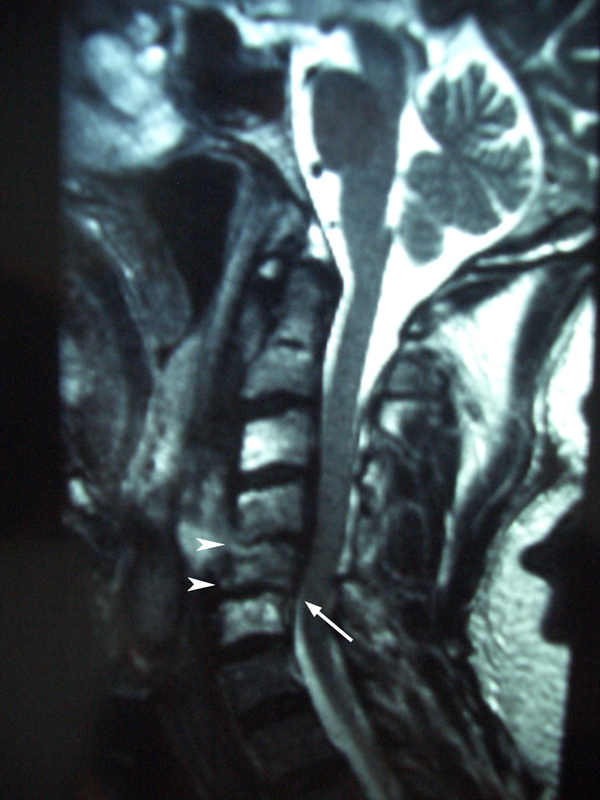
MRI showing osteoradionecrosis in the cervical vertebrae following radiotherapy for laryngeal cancer.

== Clinical findings ==
There are not many specific clinical signs of ORN. It may be first seen as an area of exposed bone which is not healing, or the non-specific signs may become evident prior to this. Symptoms vary depending on the degree of ORN that has occurred. Early indicators may be numbness or paresthesias within the mouth or jaw. Other signs and symptoms include:

- Pain
- Swelling
- Non-healing sore or ulcer in the mouth
- Trismus
- An extra-oral fistula (from jaw to skin)
- Infection in gums/teeth
- Extra-oral draining sinuses
- Lymphadenopathy
- Malocclusion
- Jaw fracture
- Sequestrum (most commonly found below the mandible)

If symptoms are evident, these should be reported to the patient's doctor or healthcare team as soon as possible.

== Epidemiology and etiology ==
=== Epidemiology ===
The epidemiology of osteoradionecrosis has proven difficult to estimate, with previous studies reporting incidence of disease between 4.74-37.5%. More recent reports have estimated the incidence to 2%, which is likely attributable to improvements in radiation therapy.

=== Pathophysiology ===
Radiation therapy destroys cancer primarily by causing DNA damage that promotes cell death. Tumor cells within a cancer are especially susceptible to damage by radiation as they frequently develop mutations in the DNA repair mechanisms that allow normal, healthy cells to recover from radiation damage. However, excessive radiation doses can cause even normal cells to be overwhelmed by DNA damage and lead to local tissue changes and necrosis. Scientists have been conducting investigations into the exact mechanisms of these changes to help create treatments since osteoradionecrosis (ORN) was first described by Regaud in 1922. Several competing theories have emerged over the years with resultant changes to accepted treatments. Initially, it was believed that ORN arose from a combination of radiation, trauma and infection. According to this belief, radiation damage to the bone caused the bone to weaken, making it susceptible to microfractures caused by trauma and allowing bacteria to invade. This theory placed ORN on a spectrum of disease with osteomyelitis, so it was primarily treated with antibiotics. In 1983, Robert E. Marx, a prominent oral and maxillofacial surgeon, refuted the notion that trauma and infection were requirements in the development of ORN. Marx proposed that ORN was the result of cumulative tissue damage caused by radiation, creating disturbances in cell metabolism and homeostasis that resulted in cell death and hypocellular tissues. In addition, radiation causes injury to the endothelial cells of local vasculature, creating a hypovascular environment which leads to decreased oxygen delivery resulting in hypoxic tissues. The decrease of vasculature helps explain why the mandible is more commonly affected than maxilla, as the mandible is served primarily by the inferior alveolar artery, whereas the maxilla is served by various arteries and has a more robust blood supply. In sum, Marx believed that ORN was essentially hypocellular-hypovascular-hypoxic tissues behaved much like chronic non-healing wounds. Initial reports by Marx and others showing that treatment with hyperbaric oxygen (HBO) prevented ORN helped support this theory. However, later studies began to raise doubts about the effectiveness of HBO therapy and question whether Marx's theory was comprehensive enough to guide treatment.

Current understanding is guided primarily by the work of Delanian and Lefaix, who proposed the radiation-induced fibroatrophic (RIF) process. Advances in lab techniques allowed scientists to perform more detailed studies of ORN specimens. Analysis of samples showed that tissues undergoing ORN underwent three phases of disease: 1) prefibrotic, 2) constitutive organized and 3) late fibroatrophic phases. During the prefibrotic phase, injury to endothelial cells secondary to radiation causes destruction of local vasculature, and recruitment of inflammatory cells and fibroblasts via pro-inflammatory cytokines like TNF-α, FGF-β and TGF-β1. In addition, osteoblasts within the bone are damaged and destroyed, leading to decreased production of normal bone tissue. In the constitutive organized phase, fibroblasts persist and are converted to myofibroblasts by these same cytokines, that begin to fibrous extracellular matrix (ECM) within the affected bone. Consequently, the increased production of ECM by myofibroblasts coupled with decreased production of osteoid by osteoblasts results in weakened bony tissue. Finally, during the late fibroatrophic phase, the affected bone becomes hypocellular as myofibroblasts begin to die and leave behind weak, fibrotic tissue. Ultimately, these tissues are fragile and susceptible to damage by trauma or infection with little ability to repair or defend themselves due to the lack of vasculature caused during the pre-fibrotic phase. Given this understanding of the pathophysiology of ORN, current treatments are targeted at decreasing inflammatory cytokines and reducing free radical damage to DNA.

=== Risk factors ===
Risk factors for osteoradionecrosis include:

- Size and location of tumor; the risk of developing ORN increases with larger tumors, since they require higher doses of radiation to achieve cure, subsequently exposing nearby tissues to higher doses. While radiation therapy has become more targeted and precise, patients with tumors located closer to the mandible (e.g. oral cavity) or maxilla (e.g. nasopharynx) will more commonly develop ORN since the bone is more likely fall within the radiation field.
- Dose and delivery of radiation; generally speaking, higher doses of radiation are more likely to result in ORN, especially when doses exceed 65 Gy. While minimizing radiation doses and avoiding excess radiation to bone can reduce ORN, there does not appear to much evidence that different radiation strategies (i.e. conventional radiotherapy, IMRT, brachytherapy) reduce risk.
- Smoking; tobacco use is associated with significant increases in risk of developing ORN. This increased risk is attributed to the vasoconstrictive properties of nicotine, which coupled with damage to endothelium by radiation, exacerbate the decreased perfusion of affected tissues.
- Diabetes mellitus; diabetes is a known cause of microvascular disease, which similar to smoking, can worsen the blood supply and perfusion to tissues affected by radiation.
- Dental disease and extractions; patients with poor oral hygiene and dental disease prior to radiation, including edentulous patients and those with dentures, are more susceptible to developing ORN. Diseased teeth near the radiation field may need to be extracted, and should be evaluated prior to radiation treatment.

=== Staging ===
The staging system can be useful as a baseline reference for management after a definitive diagnosis of ORN has been established.

Stage	Presentation	Duration	Plain radiographs	Signs & Symptoms
0	Exposed mandibular bone	< 1 month	No significant change	No Pain No Sinus/ fistulas
IA (Asymptomatic)	Exposed mandibular bone	≥ 1 month	No significant change	No Pain No Sinus/ fistulas
IB (Symptomatic)	Exposed mandibular bone	≥ 1 month	No significant change	Pain Sinus/ fistulas
IIA (Asymptomatic)	Exposed mandibular bone	≥ 1 month	Significant change Lower border of mandible is not involved	No Pain No Sinus/ fistulas
IIB (Symptomatic)	Exposed mandibular bone	≥ 1 month	Significant change Lower border of mandible is not involved	Pain Sinus/ fistulas
III	Exposed mandibular bone	≥ 1 month	Significant change Lower border of mandible is involved	Irrespective other signs of symptoms

== Prevention and management ==
There is currently no universally accepted prevention and management of ORN and in many cases depends on how severe the condition presents. Currently, there are many preventive approaches for ORN proposed, but yet to be justified by high quality evidence. Studies have been conducted to measure effectiveness of current interventions. However, there lacks evidence to conclude that one approach is more effective than others. This leads to uncertainty for clinicians and patients on deciding the best treatment that can be provided.

There are a number of classifications of ORN stages present with different basis of staging and most updated one being the Notani classification. The Notani classification of stages is based on the radiographic and clinical findings, with studies describing low grade ORN being treated conservatively and advanced ORN including pathological fractures, and oro-cutaneous fistula treated surgically.

=== Prevention ===
==== Prior to radiotherapy ====
===== Dental assessment =====
It is recommended to have a multi-disciplinary approach to care and dental assessment before the patient undergoes radiotherapy. It has been reported, that analysis of patients who have a strict preventive regime paired with IMRT resulted in no cases of ORN.

===== Dental extractions =====
As dental extractions are a major risk factor in ORN development, it was recommended to extract all teeth prior to radiotherapy. However, this is now discouraged as a treatment of choice and has many disadvantages. According to one study, the frequency of ORN pre-radiotherapy extractions and post-radiotherapy extractions are almost the same. Extractions of teeth of poor prognosis, usually less than five years is recommended and planning should take into account the likely future problems with oral care, for example if severe trismus develops and if dentures were to be prescribed, denture trauma may cause ORN. The patient's wishes must also be taken into account.

If teeth are required to be extracted, they should ideally be completed as soon as possible to maximise healing prior to radiotherapy. One study recommended a minimum of 14–21 days prior to radiotherapy. However, commencement of radiotherapy should not be delayed as there is little difference in frequency of ORN in pre- and post-radiotherapy extractions and it is recommended that trauma should be kept to a minimum during extractions.

===== Preventive regime =====
It is important to ensure that tooth brushing technique and habit is kept to a high standard. Patients undergoing head and neck radiotherapy may experience a sore mouth, therefore a soft bristle toothbrush may be preferred. Chlorhexidine mouthwash can also be used in conjunction with tooth brushing, and if too sore on the mucosa, can be diluted with equal amounts of water.

A fluoride regime is also encouraged with either high fluoride toothpaste (Duraphat 5000), wearing splints with fluoride gel applied for 10 minutes/day or alcohol free fluoride mouthwashes. The patient's oral condition needs to be taken into consideration and tailored accordingly as trismus may be present which would not allow the back of the mouth to be accessed by fluoride splints or trays. Some may also experience difficulty tolerating toothpastes and mouthwashes for a while due to altered taste and mucosal ulceration.

It is also very important that the patient maintains a high level of motivation in taking care of their oral hygiene, and attending dental appointments where a dental practitioner will be able to monitor them during and after radiotherapy. Oral preparations prescribed to aid sore or dry mouth should be fully understood by patients to avoid any preparations which can cause damage to the teeth. Any saliva substitutes given should be pH neutral.

==== Post-radiotherapy ====
Patients will still be susceptible to radiation caries and periodontal disease, more so if they present with dry mouth or access difficulty when tooth brushing. Any restorative or periodontal procedures should be commenced if indicated and endodontic treatments should take priority over extractions, although if there is a difficulty in mouth opening, endodontic treatments can be difficult or impossible. Where a tooth is deemed unrestorable, decoronation can be done. Although dentures should be avoided if a shortened dental arch is manageable, if a denture is required or being used, they should be checked routinely and any adjustment to pressure areas should be made to avoid ORN secondary to denture trauma.

===== Extractions post-radiotherapy =====
A practical recommendation is provided in some case where it is necessary to extract teeth from the jaw after radiotherapy. An assessment of the risk of ORN should be done based on the dose of radiation, the site and how easy is the extraction. Any information on risk and early signs of ORN should be given to the patient. The recommendations are listed below, however, there are some controversies on the ideal antibiotic regime and the use of hyperbaric oxygen therapy (HBO).

Summary of recommendations:

- 0.2% chlorhexidine mouthrinse given before extraction
- Oral antibiotics(3g) given 1 hour prior to extraction ( if allergic 600 mg clindamycin)
- Amoxicillin 250 mg 3 times/day or metronidazole 200 mg 3 times/day for 3–5 days post-operatively.
- Extractions should be completed with as little trauma as possible, and on simple extractions of mobile teeth
- Primary closure for firm teeth, by a minimal periosteal flap and alveolectomy
- An experienced operator
- Possibly pre-operative hyperbaric oxygen for mandibular molars in areas of high radiation
- Review 5 days post-extraction and weekly review after until healing is complete.

===== Antibiotics =====
Majority of studies on ORN have recommended the use of prophylactic antibiotic where extractions are needed post-radiotherapy, although there is no universally agreed choice, timing and course duration of antibiotic regime.

In one study, it was discovered that cases after 1986, the incidence of ORN after extractions post-radiotherapy was 3.6% in antibiotic prescribed cases and 2.6-3.4% in cases where there is no report on the prescription of antibiotics, showing no difference in reducing the risk of ORN and possibly reconsidering antibiotic regime in preventing ORN.

===== Hyperbaric oxygen therapy =====
Results since 1986 have shown of far lower rates of ORN incidence, even without HBO (3.1-3.5%) and even a slightly higher rate for HBO patients (4.0%). Prophylactic use of HBO has been recommended in some studies with a Cochrane review suggesting evidence for some reduction in ORN. However, the use of HBO prophylaxis is not agreed by others due to the insufficient evidence. Majority of British maxillofacial surgeons who participated in a survey recommended prophylactic HBO but protocols are varied.

=== Management ===
==== Conservative ====
- Antiseptic mouthwashes: Mouthrinses such as 0.02% aqueous chlorhexidine and saline can be used in acute ORN together with analgesics and anti-inflammatory drugs.
- Antibiotics: In order to eliminate infection in the region, tetracyclines can be prescribed due to their selective uptake by bone. Penicillin antibiotics can also be used because of their superficial contamination with oral bacteria.
- Ultrasound therapy: First introduced as a treatment modality in 1992, it involves the application of high-frequency sound waves to induce angiogenesis and improve blood circulation to muscles. Harris demonstrated that 48% of cases showed healing when 15 minutes of ultrasound therapy was applied daily on the skin affected by ORN, while combined with debridement.
- Hyperbaric oxygen therapy (HBO): First described in 1973, HBO was intended to be an adjunctive treatment method in ORN. The theoretical basis behind this treatment was that it causes an increase in tissue oxygen tension and an improvement in collagen synthesis, angiogenesis and epithelialization. However, its use as the only method in the management of ORN is controversial. There is little evidence to show any clinical benefit, and that it may not have therapeutical significance over a placebo.

==== Surgical ====
- Multidisciplinary approach (HBO + Surgery): Studies have shown support of combining HBO therapy and a surgical approach to treat ORN. This is in order to improve local blood circulation, with resection of necrotic bone and reconstruction with a free flap. However, some studies still state lack of benefit HBO therapy brings. It does not revive dead bone, therefore microvascular reconstruction without the use of HBO therapy is still a successful method of treating ORN.
- Surgery: The procedures involved in the surgical management of ORN are as listed: Removal of small sequestra, sequestrectomy, alveolectomy with primary closure, closure of orocutaneous fistula and large resections. Surgical management is usually required in cases of advanced disease, or if conservative measures fail to work. Methods used to reconstruct anatomical structures involve plates, autogenous bone grafts, regional flaps and free tissue transfer. Vascularised bone flaps are known to be the most effective mode of reconstruction.

==== Therapeutic approach ====
Research to treat ORN at a molecular level has increased with progress in the field of medicine. The pharmacological methods to treat ORN listed below were developed to treat the etiologic factors.

- Pentoxifylline is methylxanthine derivative that drives vascular dilation and increased erythrocyte flexibility, resulting in enhanced blood flow. It also contains anti-tumour necrosis factor α activity, and reduces the cytokine cascade that facilitates the process of ORN. However, pentoxifylline is not meant for the long-term treatment of ORN.
- Tocopherols can occur in various forms. Its alpha form, also known as vitamin E, has antioxidant properties which results in the inhibition of platelet aggregation. Alpha-tocopherol is also able to scavenge reactive oxygen species involved in the ORN disease process, by inducing cell membrane peroxidation.
- Clodronate is a non-nitrogenous bisphosphonate used in the treatment of numerous diseases, such as hyperparathyroidism, osteoporosis, and multiple myeloma. Clodronate functions by inhibiting bone resorption, due to the reduction in the activity and quantity of osteoclasts. Clodronate also acts directly on osteoblasts, which increases bone formation and reduces the growth of fibroblasts.
