= Torsa (disambiguation) =

Torsa may refer to:

- The Torsa River, which runs through Tibet, Bhutan, India and Bangladesh
- Torsa, an island in Scotland
- TORSA, an acronym for TransOral Robotic Sleep Apnea surgery
