= Maxillectomy =

Surgical procedure involving the maxilla

A maxillectomy is a surgical procedure involving the partial or complete removal of the maxilla, or upper jaw bone. It is most commonly performed to treat tumors (benign or malignant) affecting the maxilla, adjacent structures such as the hard palate, the maxillary sinus, or as part of more extensive craniofacial resections.

== Medical uses and indications ==
Maxillectomies are primarily indicated for the surgical management of neoplastic disease, especially squamous cell carcinoma of the maxilla, maxillary sinus, or hard palate. Other indications include benign tumors such as odontogenic tumors and bone tumors, infections like invasive fungal sinusitis, and chronic osteomyelitis of the maxilla. Depending on the extent of disease, maxillectomy may be combined with neck dissection and/or adjuvant therapy such as radiotherapy or chemotherapy.

== Classification and types ==
Maxillectomies are classified based on how much of the maxilla is removed and which adjacent structures are involved. These include:

- Limited maxillectomy: removal of a single wall of the maxilla, often the medial wall
- Subtotal maxillectomy: removal of at least two walls of the maxilla, often including the palate
- Total maxillectomy: complete removal of one side of the maxilla, sometimes including the hard palate and orbital floor
- Extended or radical maxillectomy: removal of the maxilla plus adjacent structures such as the orbit, cheek, or nasal cavity

Specific surgical types include medial maxillectomy (near the nasal cavity), infrastructure maxillectomy (lower portion of the maxilla including teeth, preserving the orbital floor), and suprastructure maxillectomy (upper portions of the maxilla, sometimes including the orbital floor and adjacent structures).

== Surgical technique ==
The approach depends on tumor location and extent. Preoperative workup includes imaging such as a CT scan or magnetic resonance imaging, biopsy to confirm diagnosis and margins, and planning for reconstruction using flaps or prosthetics.

Access can be through open facial incisions, mandibular osteotomy for some cases, or endoscopic/transnasal approaches for medial maxillectomy. Bone removal is tailored to tumor extent, possibly including sinus walls, palate, or orbital floor. Hemostasis is critical due to the risk of bleeding from the internal maxillary artery.

== Reconstruction ==
Reconstruction is important for speech, chewing, and appearance. Common options include:

- Free flap reconstruction using tissue from other body parts such as the fibula or scapula
- Prosthetic obturators to fill defects in the palate
- Bone plates or hardware for structural stabilization

== Recovery ==
Recovery depends on the extent of resection and reconstruction. Hospital stays may last up to two weeks. Some patients require a temporary tracheostomy and feeding tube until oral intake is safe. Speech and diet therapy are common, and special oral care is required for patients with prosthetic obturators.

== See also ==
- Le Fort osteotomy – Sectioning of the maxilla
- Head and neck cancer – Cancer arises in the head or neck region
