= Neck mass =

- Specialty: ENT surgery

A neck mass or neck lump is an ambiguous mass found in the neck area. There are many different possible causes, including head and neck cancer and congenital conditions like branchial anomalies and thyroglossal duct cysts.

== Diagnosis ==
Workup of a neck mass includes a medical history and a physical examination, where important characteristics are location, size, shape, consistency, tenderness, mobility, and color.

When this is not conclusive, further workup includes:

- Blood tests
- Medical imaging: Contrast CT is generally the initial study of choice for adults. Medical ultrasound of the neck is useful in children because it avoids the radiation dose of CT.

In some cases, fine needle aspiration may assist in the diagnosis.

== See also ==
- Cervical lymphadenopathy
