= Fibrous ankylosis =

Medical condition affecting connective tissue

Fibrous ankylosis (also known as false ankylosis) is a condition that affects fibrous connective tissue causing a limited range of movement.

Most causes occurs due to physical trauma. Other cases can be attributed to the contraction of diseases such as tubercular arthritis, (arthritis developed after contracting tuberculosis), or septic arthritis. Surgery, arthritis, rheumatoid arthritis, immobilization are also cases of this condition. Fibrous ankylosis was thought to be a precursor progress into bony ankylosis, in which osseous bone tissue fuses the affected joint, causing a greater reduction of mobility.

== Signs and symptoms ==
The symptoms of fibrous ankylosis include:

- Limited Motion of the affected Joint
- Joint stiffness
- Joint pain

For those who have contracted this condition via a viral disease such as tuberculosis, or a disease such as arthritis, inflammation is also reported.

Fibrous ankylosis can occur in the jawbone, limbs, and any other joints. Depending on which joint is affected, serious complications can occur.

For example, there is ankylosis spondylitis which is ankylosis that affects the spine. It can lead to the development of enthesitis, which is inflammation of the entheses (the site in which tendons/ligaments are inserted into bone). A severe case can lead the patient to become paralyzed. In addition, complications due to the inflammation, can lead to problems with cardiovascular (heart), pulmonary (lung), or even neurological (brain) health. Some of the secondary conditions are reported include aortitis (inflammation of the aortic wall (heart wall)) and breathing dysfunction.

There is also temporomandibular joint (TMJ) ankylosis, a rare condition in which the condyle of the mandible (jawbone) and the maniable fossa of the temporal bone fuses together. This condition can occur bilateral (on both sides of the body) and unilateral (one side of the body). The patient will have reduced ability to eat, speak properly, and maintain proper dental hygiene furthering causing starvation and malnutrition.

== Cause ==
One of the most prominent causes of Fibrous ankylosis is physical trauma. After experiencing a severe physical injury, the body will try to recover by activating it's mesenchymal stromal cells (MSCs), a type of stem cells that can differentiate into different cells such as osteoblasts, chondrocytes, and other factors such as bone matrix/growth factors that are used to stimulate growth/self mending. However, this process is altered due to the changes within the MSCs causing improper restoration of the affected part. Due to this, it allowed blood to travel outside from the initial wound to form a hematoma which will then cause the joints to stiffen as a result.

Other causes include systemic diseases such as tubercular arthritis (a form of arthritis that developed due to being infected by tuberculosis), septic arthritis, and non-infective inflammatory arthritis. When a patient contracts a disease such as tuberculosis or a bacterial infection, it causes damage to the blood vessels. The MSCs are also activated to add growth factors such as Fibroblast growth factor (FGF) or VEGF to induce angiogenesis (growth of new blood vessels). During this time, as the vessels are healing, blood will leave from outside the capillaries causing a hematoma.

Hematomas can also form if surgery is done incorrectly or the wound does not properly heal after treatment.

Sometimes even having certain genes or alleles, put a person at risk to have a certain type of ankylosis. For example, for ankylosing spondylitis, the gene HLA allele B27 is an important factor in having this disease. This allele is a human leukocyte antigen whose role is to help with the immune system by helping with identifying foreign (harmful) and native (our body's) cells. Those who have this gene have an increased risk of having ankylosing spondylitis.

Prolong immobilization is also a cause of this condition, since blood is not circulating causing it to collect within the capillaries and move from the vessels due to the pileup causing the formation of hematomas.

== Pathophysiology or mechanisms ==
The formation of the disease begins after a person would develop an intra-articular hematoma due to either physical trauma or by infection. An intra-articular hematoma is a type of hematoma that is fixed within a joint. The formation of an intra-articular hematoma is a gradual process that can occurs within months or years. The creation of a hematoma begins when the body begins to recover damage done to the blood vessels after a serious injury or a viral infection. The mesenchymal stromal cells (MSCs) will begin to differentiate to change into different forms to heal the body. For an injury, it could be an osteoblast, to promote bone health by adding new bone matrix. For an infection, it could be trying to repair the blood capillaries by inducing growth factors. At the site of either infection or injury, the MSCs will incorrectly target the area due to a wrong signal or another issue. The area will be treated, but it will redirect blood outside of the capillaries to form a hematoma due to incorrectly targeting the site or not healing properly. Generally, the hematoma will be gone after exercise or other methods, but it persists then fibrous ankylosis can form.

The direct cause of the MSCs's improper function is still unknown. However, with recent studies with animal models (sheep), it is believed that other factors such as growth factors and mechanics pay a role in developing hematomas though their effect on gene expression. For example, there is hypoxia which is a state of reduced oxygen. It is caused by a gene called hypoxia inducing factor 1α or HIF-1α. Low expression of this gene increases the severity of the hematomas. It also has many other effects such the increased promotion of osteogenesis (the creation of Osteoblasts), but the suppression of adipogenesis of MSCs, (important for differation of fat cells into other cells such as osteoblasts, myocytes, and chondrocytes). Growth factors are used to regulate cellular function and help with the differentiation of mesenchymal stromal cells through regulation. It was thought that the increased presence of some growth factors such as vascular endothelial growth factor (helps with bone regeneration and promote MSCs differentiation) or bone morphogenetic protein 7 (helps with bone fracture healing, enhancing differentiations) helps to differentiate cells. The type of ankylosis that is developed is influenced by the regulation of the MSCs. Depending on what type is sent as well as the amount makes a different in repairing injuries points. Mechanical forces also played a part inducing the type of differentiation of the MSCs, but studies on this subject isn't very clear. If the fibrous ankylosis's damage on affected joint continued, then the disease would progress to bony ankylosis, where the affected joint becomes ossified or fibrotic. The joint will then become fused and the patient will experience limited movement within it.

== Diagnosis ==
The patient's history, physical examinations, and other types of tests are used to figure out their condition. Imaging techniques are used to locate and track inflammation and misaligned bones.

One such type of imaging technique used are projectional radiography otherwise known as x ray exams. Using x rays, they would take 2d images of the person's structure to figure out if any of the joints has. It is good to use initially to see what is wrong with the joints. However, x rays are limited, and cannot see inflammation or soft tissue.

Another type test is used is CT scanning. It is used to monitor the condition of the joints, and pinpoint important information. CT Scans are used to capture the state of the affected joints, to check whether or not they are fused. It will also provide an image of where inflammation is in the joints. However, it cannot provide information on inflammation of the etheses, and it has a harder time detecting inflammation in the soft tissues.

An MRI may also be used to determine results. In comparison to the CT scan, it is more powerful as it has a greater scope of range. It can detect the soft tissue, and inflammation in the spine, joints, and other locations in great depth.

After collecting this information, the doctors will then plan their methods on how to treat their patients.

== Treatment or management ==
Early detection is necessary to avoid the major complications of this disease. Those with forms of inflammatory and autoimmune arthritis can get treatment such as NSAIDS (Aspirin, ibuprofen, Lodine, or Naproxen) to reduce inflammation and pain. Another treatment that is used are disease-modifying Antirheumatic drugs to slow down the further progression of the arthritis before it becomes ankylosis. Drugs such as Methotrexate, Hydroxychloroquine or Sulfasalazine are recommended to treat rheumatoid arthritis. If symptoms manage to process to bony ankylosis, then non-surgical treatment is the most optimal choice for treating this disease. Non surgical treatments involve taking medicine, exercise to strengthen joints, and other methods.

For more serious conditions like temporomandibular ankylosis, surgery is recommended. Condylectomy, is a type of surgery that involves removing the condyle, and readjusting the jawbone/upper month with pins/wires to straighten out the structure. In addition, another type of Condylectomy surgery, called high condylectomy surgery can be performed. Instead of removing the condyle, it is reshaped for better balance within the mouth. Arthroplasty, (surgery to replace the remove/replace bones to improve structure) is also suggested when the ankylosis has become advanced and more repair is needed for the damaged part. There was also brisement force surgery. It involves forcing the mouth open using a mouth gag to mobilize the jaw. Then, the patient is given instructions to exercise their jaw in order to keep with its consistency. It is recommended to use this as soon as the condition (TMJ ankylosis) is recognized.

== Prognosis ==
Fibrous ankylosis's prognosis differs depending on the joint affected.

Tempormandiubular joint ankylosis (TMJ ankylosis) is a rare condition affects the jawbone causing reduced movement in that area. Children around the age demographics of 4 –14 years of age catch this condition. However, it has a high mortality rate of 90% among children. This is due to the patients suffering from secondary conditions such as malnutrition, periodontal disease, and muscle atrophy due to this condition. It must be treated with surgery as soon as possible. Even with successful surgery, it has a 50% chance of reoccurring.

On the other hand, those who suffer from Ankylosis spondylitis have not perished due to this condition, but due to secondary complications of it. As a result, conditions of the heart, lung, or brain, it increases the mortality rate for those patients. In addition, smoking and other bad habits increase the mortality rate as well.

== Epidemiology ==
The epidemiology, (incidence rate) changes depending on the joints affected.

Tempormandiubular joint ankylosis (TMJ ankylosis) which is ankylosis of the mandible, affects children around the ages of 4-14. It also has a tendency to affect women more than men. For children, the most common cause of this condition is due to physical trauma and infection.

Case of Ankylosis spondylitis tend to develop between the ages of 30 and 45. It has a tendency to affect men more than women. It also seems to affect those of a low socioeconomic status. It also has a tendency to appear during youth affecting 5% of children. The direct cause of ankylosis spondylitis is unknown, but those who have the allele HLA-B27, have a greater chance in getting this condition.

== Research directions ==
Further research in this area of study focus on developing new methods for better treatment for those who are suffering from different forms of ankylosis. There are new studies featuring methods to improve grafts for TMJ ankylosis by studying current models. Fat grafting is also being studied for their use, and how it used as a definitive treatment for treating adults with TMJ. There is also research via animal studies to preserve the foundation of the mandibular condyle to reduce risk of ankylosis.

There is also research focusing on isolating and identifying certain genes that cause the condition to form. However, it is a more complex matter since more factors are involved in the process. A recent study identified more than 100 loci to inherit ankylosis spondylitis, but it explains less than 30% of heritability. More factors including presentation and antigen processing need to be studied to understand more.
