= Transoral laser microsurgery =

- Other names: (TLM)
- Specialty: Surgical oncology

Transoral laser microsurgery (TLM) is a form of minimally invasive surgery used to remove small and medium tumors through the mouth. It is selectively used for larger tumors. Transoral laser microsurgery allows surgeons to remove tumors from the voice box with no external incisions and is especially applied to HPV-mediated oropharynx malignancy (tonsils, base of tongue). It also allows access to tumors that are not reachable with robotic surgery and is significantly conserving of normal tissue.

A microscope helps the surgeon clearly view the deep and perimeter margins of the tumor, ensuring complete clearance of the tumor and minimizing the amount of normal tissue removed or damaged during surgery. A CO_{2} laser is used for removing the tumor with high precision so that the pathologist can evaluate the margin status at the edge of the surgical specimen. The laser leaves a particularly "light" surgical foot print in the patient's throat tissues. This technique helps give the patient as much speech and swallowing function as possible after surgery. TLM is also, by published evidence, the best technique for discovering unknown primary tumors of the throat and larynx area, and removing them.

== Publications ==
- Karni R, Haughey B, Transoral Laser Microsurgery: A New Approach for Unknown Primaries of the Head and Neck, Laryngoscope,2011 Jun;121(6):1194-1201. http://onlinelibrary.wiley.com/doi/10.1002/lary.21743/pdf
- Rich J, Liu J, Haughey B, Swallowing Function after Transoral Laser Microsurgery (TLM) ± Adjuvant Therapy for Advanced Stage Oropharyngeal Cancer, Laryngoscope,2011 Nov;121(11):2381-90. http://onlinelibrary.wiley.com/doi/10.1002/lary.21406/pdf
- Haughey BH, Hinni ML, Salassa JR, Grant DG, Rich JT, Milov S, Lewis Jr JS, Krishan M, Transoral Laser Microsurgery as Primary Treatment of Advanced Stage Oropharynx Cancer: A United States Multicenter Study. Head and Neck. 2011 Dec;33(12):1683-94.http://onlinelibrary.wiley.com/doi/10.1002/hed.21669/pdf
- Rich JT, Milov S, Lewis Jr, JS, Thorstad WL, Adkins DR, Haughey BH, Transoral Laser Microsurgery (TLM) ± Adjuvant Therapy for Advanced Stage Oropharyngeal Cancer: Outcomes and Prognostic Factors, Laryngoscope, Volume 119, No. 9, pp 1709–1719, September 2009. http://onlinelibrary.wiley.com/doi/10.1002/lary.20552/pdf
- Hinni M, Salassa J, Grant D, Pearson B, Hayden R, Martin A, Christiansen H, Haughey B, Nussenbaum B, Steiner W, Transoral Laser Microsurgery for Advanced Laryngeal Cancer, Archives of Otolaryngology–Head & Neck Surgery, Volume 133, No 12, pp 1198–1204, December 2007. http://archotol.ama-assn.org/cgi/reprint/133/12/1198
