= Tracheal tumor =

- Specialty: Oncology

A tracheal tumor is a tumor primarily presenting in the trachea. It may be benign or malignant. 80% of all tracheal tumors are malignant. Among these, the most common are the squamous-cell carcinoma and the adenoid cystic carcinoma.
