= Fungal sinusitis =

Inflammation of the paranasal sinuses due to fungal infection

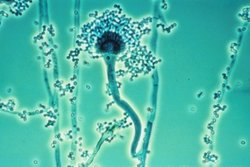
- Aspergillus is responsible in 90% of cases of fungal sinusitis
- Specialty: Pulmonology
- Symptoms: Facial pain
- Types: Invasive, Non-invasive
- Diagnostic method: CT scan, MRI
- Treatment: Surgical(Management depends on which type)

Fungal sinusitis or fungal rhinosinusitis is the inflammation of the lining mucosa of the paranasal sinuses due to a fungal infection. It occurs in people with reduced immunity. The maxillary sinus is the most commonly involved. Fungi responsible for fungal sinusitis are Aspergillus fumigatus (90%), Aspergillus flavus, and Aspergillus niger. Fungal sinusitis occurs most commonly in middle-aged populations. Diabetes mellitus is the most common risk factor involved.

== Types ==
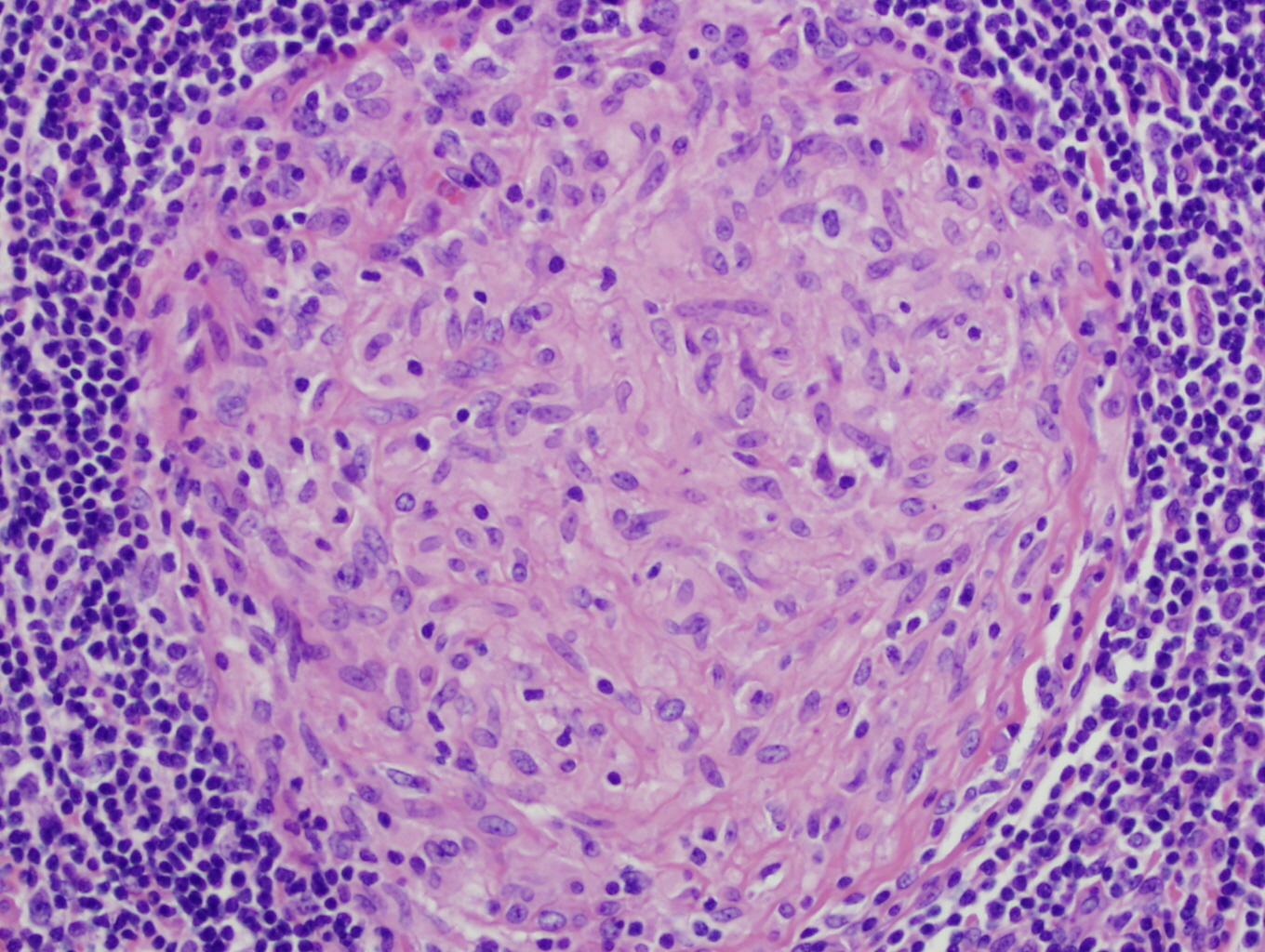
Granuloma

The types of fungal sinusitis are based on invasive and non-invasive as follows:

- Invasive

- Acute fulminant
- Chronic invasive
- Granulomatous

- Non Invasive

- Saprophytic infection
- Sinus fungal ball
- Eosinophil related FRS including AFRS

- Fulminant

=== Difference between non-invasive, invasive and fulminant fungal sinusitis ===
The type of fungal disease highly depends on the immunity of the patient. When a person has low immunity, they can get non-invasive fungal sinusitis, where the fungus will infect only the skin lining of the nasal and sinus cavity. When the immunity gets lowered, it will turn into invasive fungal sinusitis, and the infection can seep into the tissues making the infection dangerous. A person can have both non-invasive and invasive fungal sinusitis at the same time at different locations.

Fulminant is the rarest and the most dangerous infection that can occur when immunity is too low. In this type of disease, the infection will not only seep into the tissues but also into blood vessels. Although it comes under invasive technically, when we say invasive fungal sinusitis we often refer to non-fulminant invasive fungal sinusitis as we can clearly distinguish both irrespective of the fact that symptoms are the same. The differentiating factor between invasive and fulminant infections is that the progress of the disease is very rapid in fulminant. The progress of the disease is so quick that it can kill a person in a month if not treated. One of the most common type of fulminant fungal infection is mucormycosis.

== Signs and symptoms ==
Individuals with the condition of fungal sinusitis mostly present with features that include facial pain and pain around the eyes, nasal congestion, rhinorrhea (running nose), headache, later there may be ophthalmoplegia (paralysis of ocular muscles).

== Pathophysiology ==
The mechanism of fungal sinusitis depends on which form, such as:

- Acute fulminant form – the fungus invades into vessels causing thrombosis, necrosis with minimum inflammation
- Chronic invasive – fungal hyphae invades tissue leaving necrosis with minimal inflammation
- Granulomatous form – invasive hyphae invades tissue with inflammation and non-caseating granuloma (with foreign bodies).
- Saprophytic infection – growth of fungus seen on mucous crusts within sinus cavity.
- Sinus fungal ball – sequestration of fungal hyphae as densely tangled, and has gritty matted appearance.
- Eosinophil related Allergic fungal sinusitis – though not completely understood, a possible mechanism sees the protein component of fungus elicits IgE mediated allergic mucosal inflammation.

== Diagnosis ==
In terms of diagnosis, the clinical examination gives an idea about fungal sinusitis, as well as:

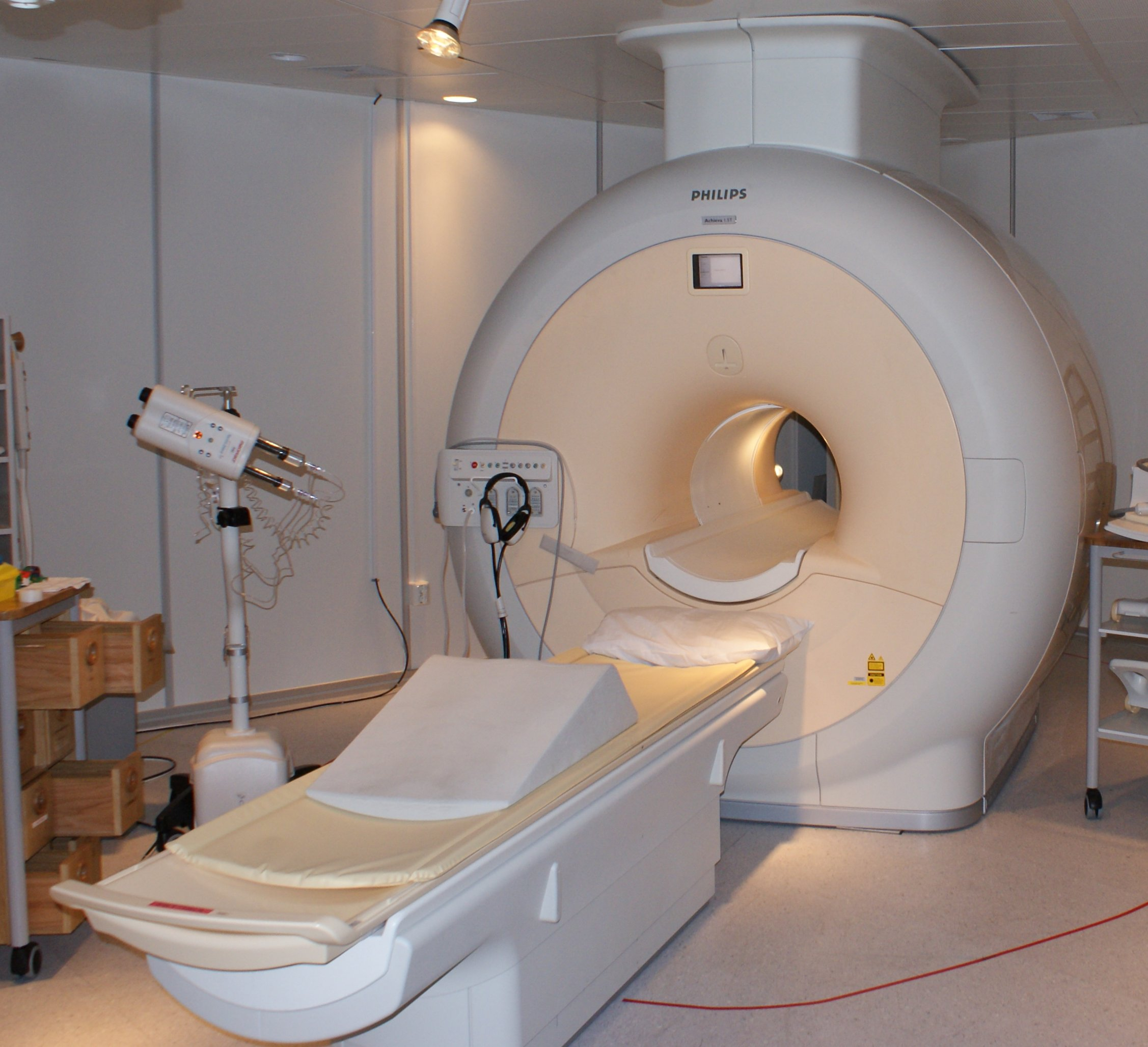
MRI

- Suggestive clinical features include - multiple recurrent episodes, persistent pathology, and absent ability to smell (the Eustachian tube may also be affected).
- X-Ray - can be done if the diagnosis is not certain.
- CT – can document the presence of sinusitis, in the coronal views
- MRI – used to find the CNS spread (extent of the disease), to evaluate individuals who demonstrate signs of invasive fungal sinusitis
- Histology studies

== Treatment ==
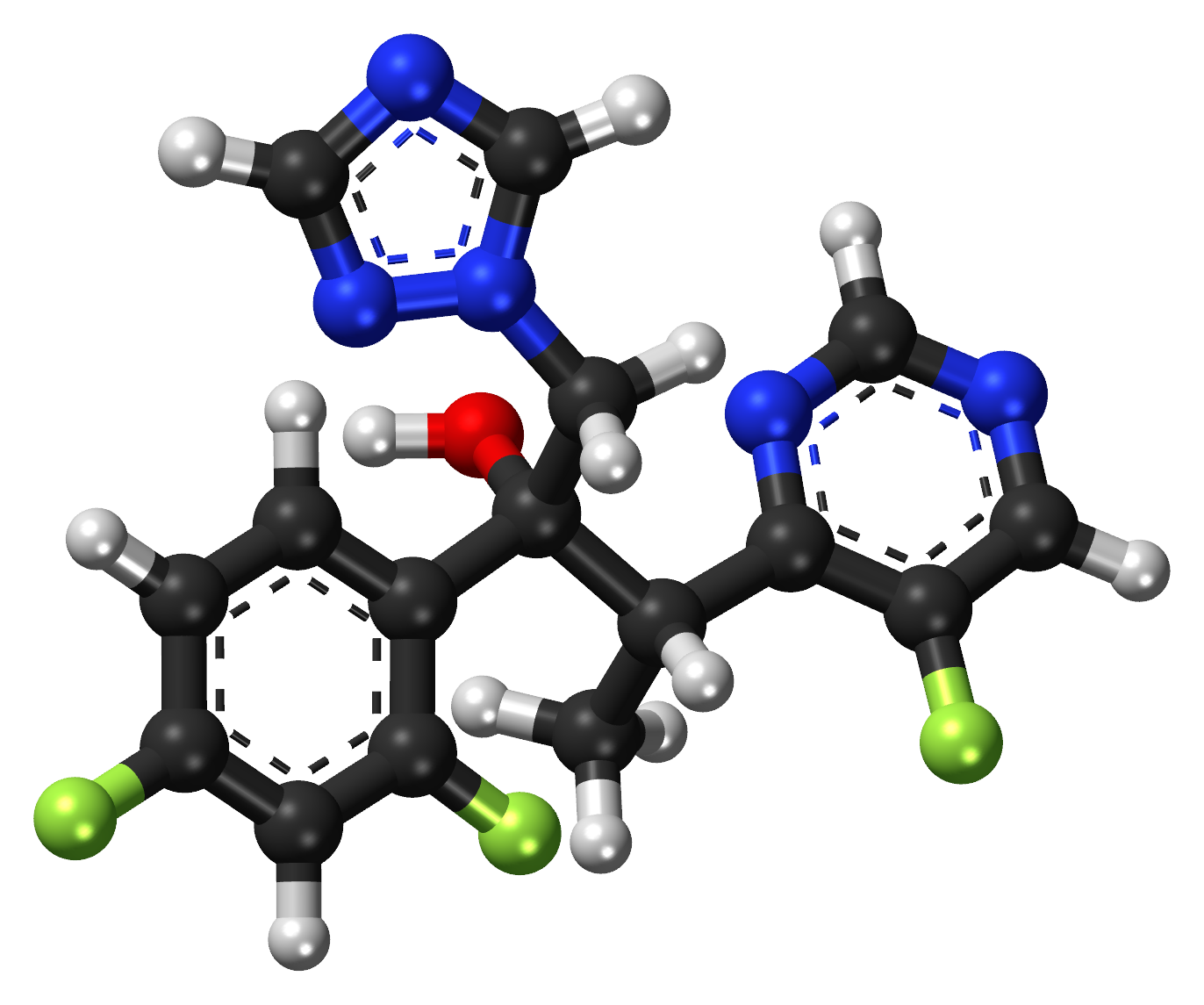
Voriconazole

Treatment for fungal sinusitis can include surgical debridement; helps by slowing progression of disease thus allowing time for recovery additionally we see the options below:

- In cases where the fungus has invaded the sinus tissue, echinocandins, oral voriconazole, and I.V amphotericin may be used
- For allergic fungal sinusitis, systemic corticosteroids like prednisolone, methylprednisolone are added for their anti-inflammatory effect, bronchodilators and expectorants help to clear secretions in the sinuses.

== Epidemiology ==
Though it is widely held that fungal infections of the nose and paranasal sinuses are not common, most agree that their frequency has been increasing over past decades.

== See also ==
- Granuloma
