= Transoral robotic surgery =

- Specialty: Otolaryngology

Transoral robotic surgery (TORS) is a modern surgical technique used to treat tumors of the throat via direct access through the mouth. Transoral robotic sleep apnea (TORSA) surgery utilizes the same approach to open the upper airway of those with obstructive sleep apnea. This technique has gained popularity thanks to its wristed instruments and magnified three-dimensional view, enhancing surgical comfort and precision in remote-access areas.

In TORS and TORSA procedures, the surgeon uses a surgical robot to view and access structures in the oral cavity (mouth), pharynx (back of the throat) and larynx (voice box) without any incisions through the neck, chin or lip (these incisions are necessary in traditional, non-robotic approaches). Current TORS indications include excision of tumors of the oropharynx (tonsils, soft palate, base of tongue, posterior pharyngeal wall), hypopharynx and larynx (epiglottis). Its use has been extended to approaches of the parapharyngeal space and skull base. The TORSA technique is used for uvulopalatopharyngoplasty, hemiglossectomy, and other airway procedures.

== History ==
The TORS technique was first developed in 2004-2005 by Drs. Neil Hockstein, Gregory Weinstein and Bert O'Malley Jr. at the University of Pennsylvania. At the time, surgical robots, in particular the da Vinci Surgical System, were already being used in urologic, thoracic and abdominal procedures. While many had appreciated the potential value of the surgical robot for otolaryngological procedures, none had developed strategies to access the oropharynx. Hockstein recognized that the standard "closed tube" laryngoscopes typically used for pharyngeal and laryngeal procedures were poorly suited to robotic surgery, but by adapting different retractors, access could be achieved. Over the next several years, Drs. Hockstein, Weinstein and O'Malley conducted research to demonstrate the efficacy and safety of the TORS technique. They proved the efficacy of the TORS procedures for cancer treatment, with fewer complications and shorter hospital stays as compared to the established otolaryngological techniques of open surgical resection and some conventional endoscopic surgery. TORS afforded cancer cure with less blood loss and complication frequency. In light of this data, the FDA approved the da Vinci system to perform TORS procedures in 2009.

Dr. Erica Thaler, also at the University of Pennsylvania, researched the applications of the TORS approach to patients with obstructive sleep apnea, and published her work in 2016. She found that a multilevel approach, including lingual tonsillectomy (removal of the lingual tonsils, located at the base of the tongue) and uvulopalatopharyngoplasty, increased airway space and oxygen levels in most cases. The newly minted procedure was found especially beneficial for patients without prior pharyngeal surgery.

== Procedural details ==
To begin a TORS/TORSA procedure, the patient is anesthetized in the supine position. A retractor is used to open the mouth to create room for the robotic camera and surgical instruments. The da Vinci patient-side cart is then brought to the bedside and the robotic instruments and camera are guided into the patient's mouth. Once the operation begins, the surgeon sits at the surgeon's console and views the patient's throat through a 3-dimensional scope. As the surgeon manipulates the instrument controls, the robotic instruments move deep inside the patient's mouth, and the operation is performed. Resection of tissue and suturing are accomplished with the advantages of the surgical robot at the back of the pharynx.

The defining aspects of the TORS technique are:

1. The operation is performed with the technology of the surgical robot.
2. The robotic instruments are placed in the patient's mouth, rather than through an external incision.

Variations in the TORS technique are due to location of the cancer or obstruction and to the surgeon's preference.

== Indications ==
=== Cancerous or benign tumors ===
TORS provides an excellent alternative to radiotherapy or chemoradiotherapy and traditional open surgeries for some selected cases of pharyngeal and laryngeal cancers. Chemotherapy and radiotherapy are associated with long-term, potentially harmful toxicities, and open surgeries are highly invasive and prone to serious complications and extended hospital stays. TORS avoids these issues by avoiding the external incisions and sometimes reducing surgical time, both of which are associated with increased blood loss and infection. There are ongoing clinical trials collecting data on TORS, but numerous studies have repeatedly shown it to be both safe and effective in treating malignant tumors of the head and neck. Its use for the treatment of benign head and neck tumors has also been validated.

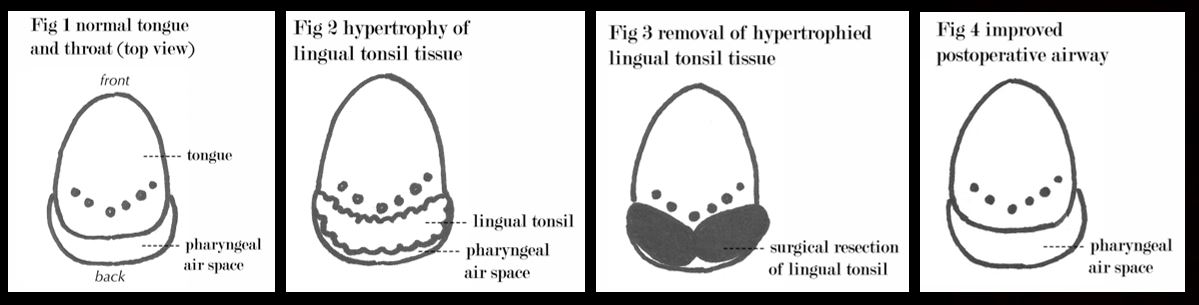
Figure 1: This diagram shows how TORSA increases the airway size when the lingual tonsils are too large.

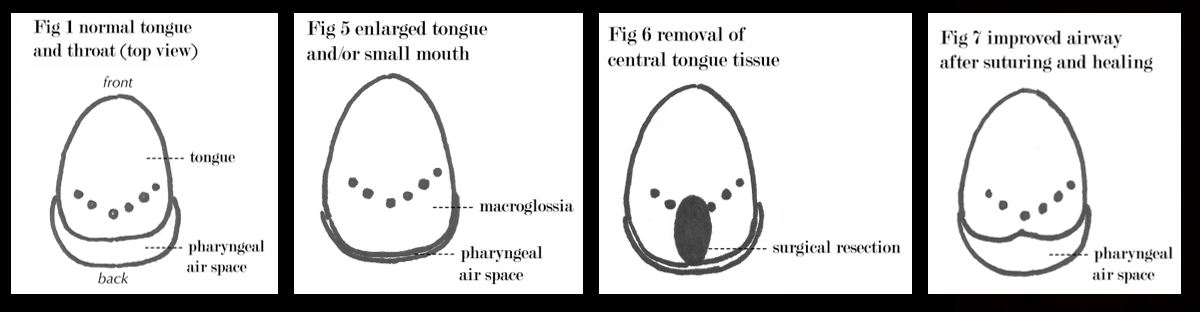
Figure 2: This diagram shows how TORSA increases the airway size when the mouth is too small or the tongue is too large.

=== Obstructive sleep apnea ===
The objective of TORSA (transoral sleep apnea) surgery is to increase the size of the air space leading from the mouth to the trachea. This can include removal of the tonsils, adenoids, uvula and edge of the palate, and/or part of the base of the tongue (lingual tonsils). When removal of the lingual tonsils is necessary, it can be removed in one of two ways. If the lingual tonsil tissue is large along the back of the tongue, it is shaved in a side-to-side direction [Figure 1]. If the tongue is exceedingly large compared to the size of the throat, it is reduced by resecting tissue in the midline [Figure 2]. Quantitative studies of patient outcomes are not yet available.

The apnea–hypopnea index (AHI), the number of breathing obstructions or near-obstructions per hour of sleep, is one common way to measure the degree of a patient's sleep apnea. The higher the number, the worse the breathing during sleep. In a 2016 study of 75 patients, the average decrease in AHI post-TORS was 45%. Another 2016 study found an average AHI reduction of 51% in 11 patients. Researchers have also investigated the effect of TORS surgery for obstructive sleep apnea on swallowing function. A 2015 study of 78 patients found that oral feeding was resumed on average 1.05 days post-operatively, and not a single patient complained of long-term swallowing difficulty.

== Outcomes ==
TORS procedures offer many advantages to the alternative surgical techniques of open surgical resection and conventional endoscopic surgery. The current literature indicates that the TORS technique results in less blood loss, shorter hospital stays, and lower complication rates than open surgery. It may result in a reduction of the rate of tracheostomy, while the indication for tracheostomy is still a matter of debate.

=== TORS as a cancer treatment ===
In a study including data from 410 patients. This study demonstrated 91.8% 2-year locoregional control of the cancer, and 94.5% 2-year disease-specific survival. These numbers are similar to those of other head and neck cancer treatment options. A separate study of 62 patients found that 69% resumed oral intake prior to discharge, and 83% within two weeks.

=== Complications ===
Many studies have evaluated TORS patient outcomes and have found complications in 10-25% of cases. Most of these are minor, including dehydration, tooth injury, minor bleeding, dysphagia, dysgeusia, tongue numbness and uncontrolled pain. Fewer patients develop major complications, which include hemorrhage, deep venous thrombosis, pneumonia, pulmonary embolism, asphyxia or death.
