= Neck dissection =

Surgical procedure

- Location of the incision used in a neck dissection
- Specialty: Oncology

The neck dissection is a surgical procedure for control of neck lymph node metastasis from squamous cell carcinoma (SCC) of the head and neck. The aim of the procedure is to remove lymph nodes from one side of the neck into which cancer cells may have migrated. Metastasis of squamous cell carcinoma into the lymph nodes of the neck reduces survival and is the most important factor in the spread of the disease. The metastases may originate from SCC of the upper aerodigestive tract, including the oral cavity, tongue, nasopharynx, oropharynx, hypopharynx, and larynx, as well as the thyroid, parotid and posterior scalp.

== History of neck dissections ==
- 1906 – George W. Crile of the Cleveland Clinic describes the radical neck dissection. The operation encompasses removal of all the lymph nodes on one side of the neck, and includes removal of the spinal accessory nerve (SAN), internal jugular vein (IJV) and sternocleidomastoid muscle (SCM).
- 1957 – Hayes Martin describes routine use of the radical neck dissection for control of neck metastases.
- 1967 – Oscar Suarez and E. Bocca describe a more conservative operation that preserves SAN, IJV and SCM.
- Last 3 decades – Further operations have been described to selectively remove the involved regional lymph groups.

== Division of the neck into levels and sublevels ==
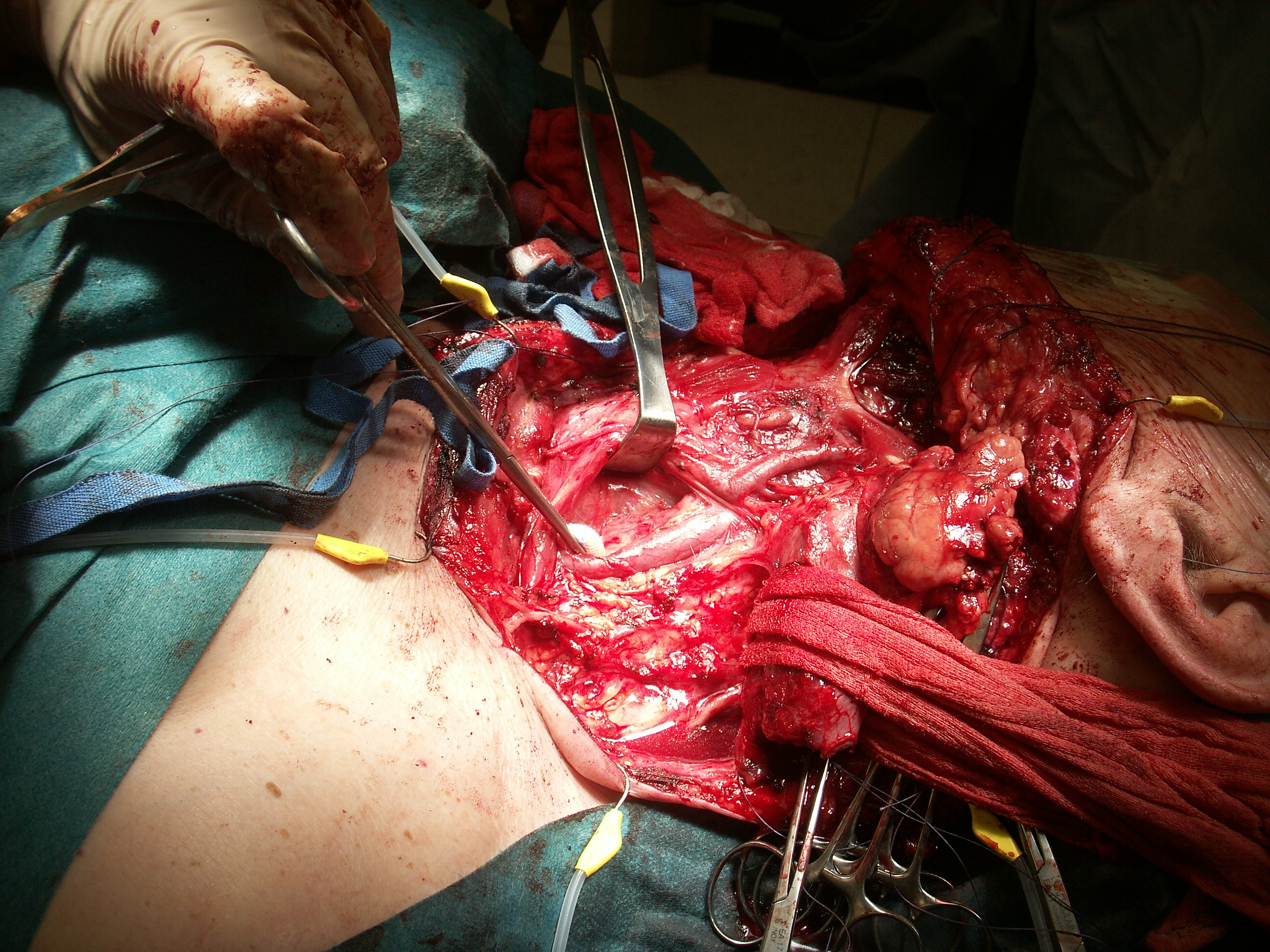
Modified radical neck dissection

To describe the lymph nodes of the neck for neck dissection, the neck is divided into 6 areas called Levels. The levels are identified by Roman numeral, increasing towards the chest. A further Level VII to denote lymph node groups in the superior mediastinum is no longer used. Instead, lymph nodes in other non-neck regions are referred to by the name of their specific nodal groups.

- Level I – This includes the submental and submandibular lymph nodes.
  The submental triangle (sublevel IA) is bounded by the anterior belly of the digastric muscles (laterally) and the hyoid (inferiorly). The submandibular triangle (sublevel IB) is bounded by the body of the mandible (superiorly), the stylohyoid (posteriorly), and the anterior belly of the digastric (anteriorly).
- Level II – This includes lymph nodes of the upper jugular group and is divided into sublevels IIA and IIB.
  Level II is bounded by the inferior border of the hyoid (inferiorly), the base of skull (superiorly), the stylohyoid muscle (anteriorly) and the posterior border of the SCM (posteriorly). Sublevel IIA nodes lie anterior to the SAN. Sublevel IIB nodes lie posterior to the SAN.
- Level III – This includes lymph nodes of the middle jugular group.
  This level is bounded by the inferior border of the hyoid (superiorly) and the inferior border of the cricoid (inferiorly), the posterior border of the sternohyoid (anteriorly) and the posterior border of the SCM (posteriorly).
- Level IV – This includes lymph nodes of the lower jugular group.
  This level is bounded by the inferior border of the cricoid (superiorly), the clavicle / sternal notch (inferiorly), the posterior border of the sternohyoid (anteriorly) and the posterior border of the SCM (posteriorly).
- Level V – This includes posterior compartment lymph nodes.
  This compartment is bounded by the clavicle (inferiorly), the anterior border of the trapezius (posteriorly), the posterior border of the SCM (anteriorly). It is divided into sublevels VA (lying above a transverse plane marking the inferior border of the anterior cricoid arch) and VB (below the aforementioned plane).
- Level VI – This includes the anterior compartment lymph nodes.
  This compartment is bounded by the common carotid arteries (laterally), the hyoid (superiorly), the suprasternal notch (inferiorly).

== Classification of neck dissections ==
The 2001 revisions proposed by the American Head and Neck Society (AHNS) and the American Academy of Otolaryngology-Head and Neck Surgery (AAO-HNS) are as follows.

1. Radical Neck Dissection (RND) – removal of all ipsilateral cervical lymph node groups from levels I through V, together with SAN, SCM and IJV.
2. Modified Radical Neck Dissection (MRND) – removal of all lymph node groups routinely removed in a RND, but with preservation of one or more nonlymphatic structures (SAN, SCM and IJV).
3. Selective Neck Dissection (SND) (together with the use of parentheses to denote the levels or sublevels removed) – cervical lymphadenectomy with preservation of one or more lymph node groups that are routinely removed in a RND. Thus for oral cavity cancers, SND (I–III) is commonly performed. For oropharyngeal, hypopharyngeal and laryngeal cancers, SND (II–IV) is the procedure of choice.
4. Extended Neck Dissection. This refers to removal of one or more additional lymph node groups or nonlymphatic structures, or both, not encompassed by the RND.
