= History of lead =

World lead production peaking in the Roman period and the Industrial Revolution

Lead (chemical symbol: Pb, atomic number: 82) is one of the earliest metals worked by humans. It is known to have been smelted as early as the 7th millennium BC and spread widely due to its frequent association with silver ores. Ancient civilizations across the Near East, Mediterranean, Asia, Africa, and the Americas employed lead in construction, tools, currency, cosmetics, warfare, and writing, with production reaching a peak during the Roman Empire. After the fall of the Western Roman Empire, lead mining and use expanded in Asia and later revived in Europe during the Middle Ages and Renaissance, when it was also central to alchemy, printing, architecture, and armaments. The Industrial Revolution marked a new period of large-scale production and widespread exposure, leading to increased recognition of lead’s toxicity and the introduction of public health regulations. In the 20th century, lead was progressively restricted in paints, plumbing, and fuels due to its health impacts, while remaining important in industrial applications such as lead–acid batteries, with global production patterns shifting toward Eastern Europe and Asia.

== Prehistory and early history ==
Metallic lead beads dating back to 7000–6500 BC have been found in Asia Minor and may represent the first example of metal smelting. At that time, lead had few (if any) applications due to its softness and dull appearance. The major reason for the spread of lead production was its association with silver, which may be obtained by burning galena (a common lead mineral). The Ancient Egyptians were the first to use lead minerals in cosmetics, an application that spread to Ancient Greece and beyond; the Egyptians had used lead for sinkers in fishing nets, glazes, glasses, enamels, ornaments. Various civilizations of the Fertile Crescent used lead as a writing material, as coins, and as a construction material. Lead was used by the ancient Chinese as a stimulant, as currency, as contraceptive, and in chopsticks. The Indus Valley civilization and the Mesoamericans used it for making amulets; and the eastern and southern Africans used lead in wire drawing.

== Classical era ==
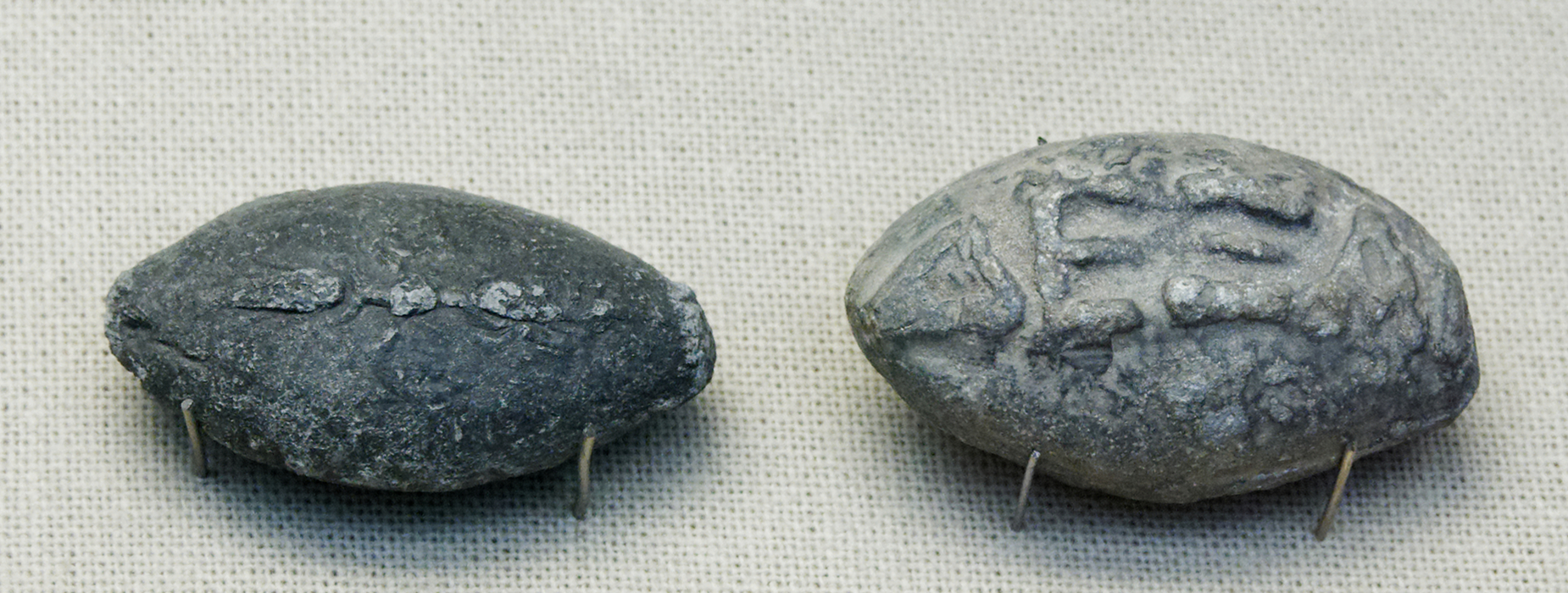
Ancient Greek lead sling bullets with a winged thunderbolt molded on one side and the inscription ΔΕΞΑΙ ("take that") on the other side

Because silver was extensively used as a decorative material and an exchange medium, lead deposits came to be worked in Asia Minor from 3000 BC; later, lead deposits were developed in the Aegean and Laurion. These three regions collectively dominated production of mined lead until c. 1200 BC. Beginning c. 2000 BC, the Phoenicians worked deposits in the Iberian peninsula; by 1600 BC, lead mining existed in Cyprus, Greece, and Sardinia.

Rome's territorial expansion in Europe and across the Mediterranean, and its development of mining, led to it becoming the greatest producer of lead during the classical era, with an estimated annual output peaking at 80,000 tonnes. Like their predecessors, the Romans obtained lead mostly as a by-product of silver smelting. Lead mining occurred in central Europe, Britain, Balkans, Greece, Anatolia, Hispania, the latter accounting for 40% of world production.

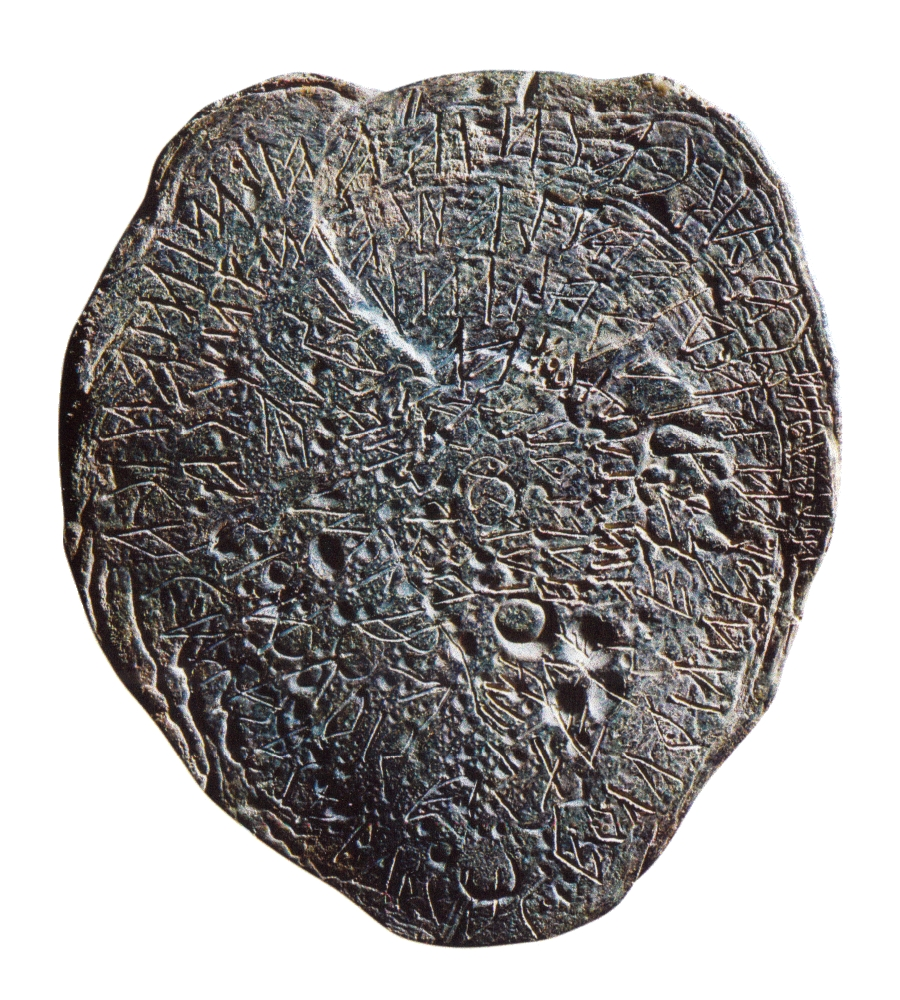
The Lead Plaque of Magliano, Italy, bears an Etruscan inscription from mid-5th century BC.

Lead tablets were commonly used as a material for letters. Lead coffins, cast in flat sand forms and with interchangeable motifs to suit the faith of the deceased, were used in ancient Judea. Lead was used to make sling bullets from the 5th century BC. In Roman times, lead sling bullets were amply used, and were effective at a distance of between 100 and 150 meters. The Balearic slingers, used as mercenaries in Carthaginian and Roman armies, were famous for their shooting distance and accuracy.

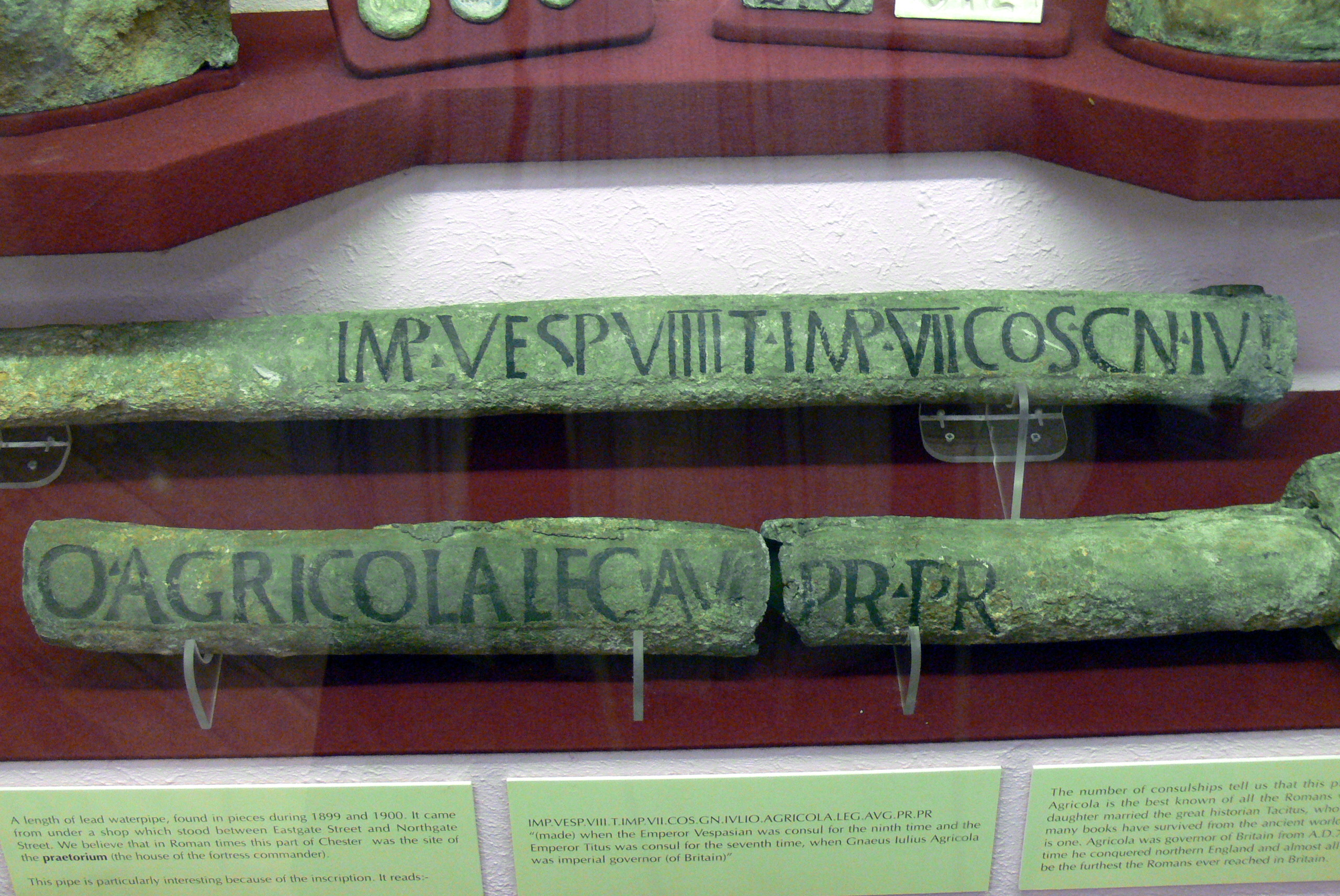
Roman lead pipes (Note: The inscription reads: "Made when the Emperor Vespasian was consul for the ninth term and the Emperor Titus was consul for the seventh term, when Gnaeus Iulius Agricola was imperial governor (of Britain).")

Lead was used for making water pipes in the Roman Empire; the Latin word for the metal, plumbum, is the origin of the English word "plumbing". Its ease of working, its low melting point enabling the easy fabrication of completely waterproof welded joints, and its resistance to corrosion ensured its widespread use in other applications, including pharmaceuticals, roofing, currency, warfare. Writers of the time, such as Cato the Elder, Columella, and Pliny the Elder, recommended lead (and lead-coated) vessels for the preparation of sweeteners and preservatives added to wine and food. The lead conferred an agreeable taste due to the formation of "sugar of lead" (lead(II) acetate), whereas copper vessels imparted a bitter flavor through verdigris formation.

This metal was by far the most used material in classical antiquity, and it is appropriate to refer to the (Roman) Lead Age. Lead was to the Romans what plastic is to us.

— Heinz Eschnauer and Markus Stoeppler
"Wine—An enological specimen bank", 1992

The Roman author Vitruvius reported the health dangers of lead and modern writers have suggested that lead poisoning played a major role in the decline of the Roman Empire. (Note: The fact that Julius Caesar fathered only one child, as well as the alleged sterility of his successor, Caesar Augustus, have been attributed to lead poisoning.) Other researchers have criticized such claims, pointing out, for instance, that not all abdominal pain is caused by lead poisoning. According to archaeological research, Roman lead pipes increased lead levels in tap water but such an effect was "unlikely to have been truly harmful". When lead poisoning did occur, victims were called "saturnine", dark and cynical, after the ghoulish father of the gods, Saturn. By association, lead was considered the father of all metals. Its status in Roman society was low as it was readily available and cheap.

=== Confusion with tin and antimony ===
Since the Bronze Age, metallurgists and engineers have understood the difference between rare and valuable tin, essential for alloying with copper to produce tough and corrosion resistant bronze, and 'cheap and cheerful' lead. However, the nomenclature in some languages is similar. Romans called lead plumbum nigrum ("black lead"), and tin plumbum candidum ("bright lead"). The association of lead and tin can be seen in other languages: the word olovo in Czech translates to "lead", but in Russian, its cognate олово (olovo) means "tin". To add to the confusion, lead bore a close relation to antimony: both elements commonly occur as sulfides (galena and stibnite), often together. Pliny incorrectly wrote that stibnite would give lead on heating, instead of antimony. In countries such as Turkey and India, the originally Persian name surma (Persian: سرمه) came to refer to either antimony sulfide or lead sulfide, and in some languages, such as Russian, gave its name to antimony (сурьма).

== Middle Ages and the Renaissance ==
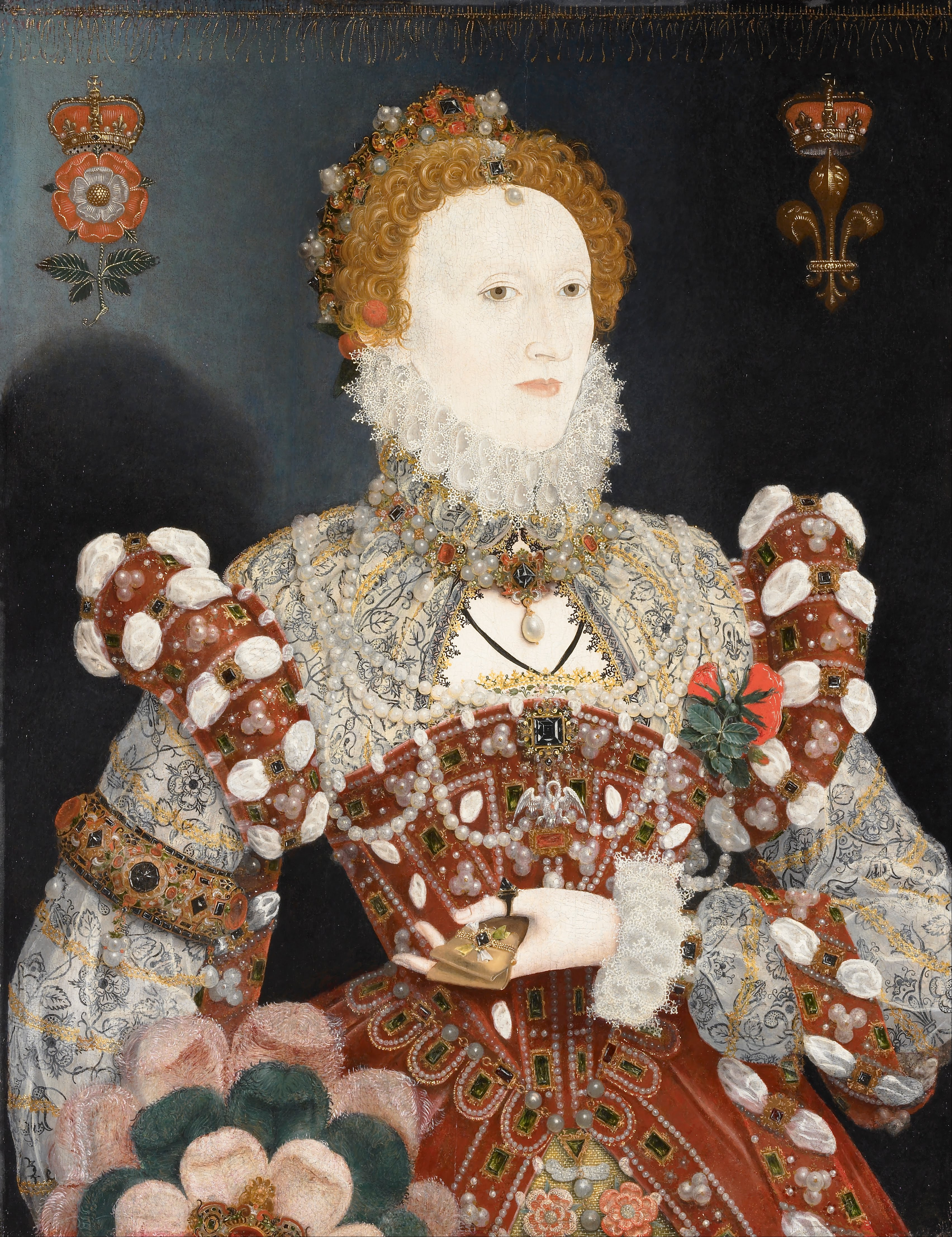
Elizabeth I of England was commonly depicted with a whitened face. Lead in face whiteners is thought to have contributed to her death.

Lead mining in Western Europe declined after the fall of the Western Roman Empire, with Al-Andalus being the only region having a significant output. The largest production of lead occurred in South Asia and East Asia, especially China and India, where lead mining grew rapidly.

In Europe, lead production began to increase in the 11th and 12th centuries, when it was again used for roofing and piping. Starting in the 13th century, lead was used to create stained glass. In the European and Muslim traditions of alchemy, lead (symbol ♄ in the European tradition) was considered an impure base metal which, by the separation, purification and balancing of its constituent essences, could be transformed to pure and incorruptible gold. During the period, lead was used increasingly for adulterating wine. The use of such wine was forbidden for use in Christian rites by a papal bull in 1498, but it continued to be imbibed and resulted in mass poisonings up to the late 18th century. Lead was a key material in parts of the printing press, and lead dust was commonly inhaled by print workers, causing lead poisoning. Lead also became the chief material for making bullets for firearms: it was cheap, less damaging to iron gun barrels, had a higher density (which allowed for better retention of velocity), and its lower melting point made the production of bullets easier as they could be made using a wood fire. Lead, in the form of Venetian ceruse, was extensively used in cosmetics by Western European aristocracy as whitened faces were regarded as a sign of modesty. This practice later expanded to white wigs and eyeliners, and only faded out with the French Revolution in the late 18th century. A similar fashion appeared in Japan in the 18th century with the emergence of the geishas, a practice that continued long into the 20th century. The white faces of women "came to represent their feminine virtue as Japanese women", with lead commonly used in the whitener.

== Outside Europe and Asia ==
In the New World, lead production was recorded soon after the arrival of European settlers. The earliest record dates to 1621 in the English Colony of Virginia, fourteen years after its foundation. In Australia, the first mine opened by colonists on the continent was a lead mine, in 1841. In Africa, lead mining and smelting were known in the Benue Trough and the lower Congo Basin, where lead was used for trade with Europeans, and as a currency by the 17th century, well before the scramble for Africa.

== Industrial Revolution ==
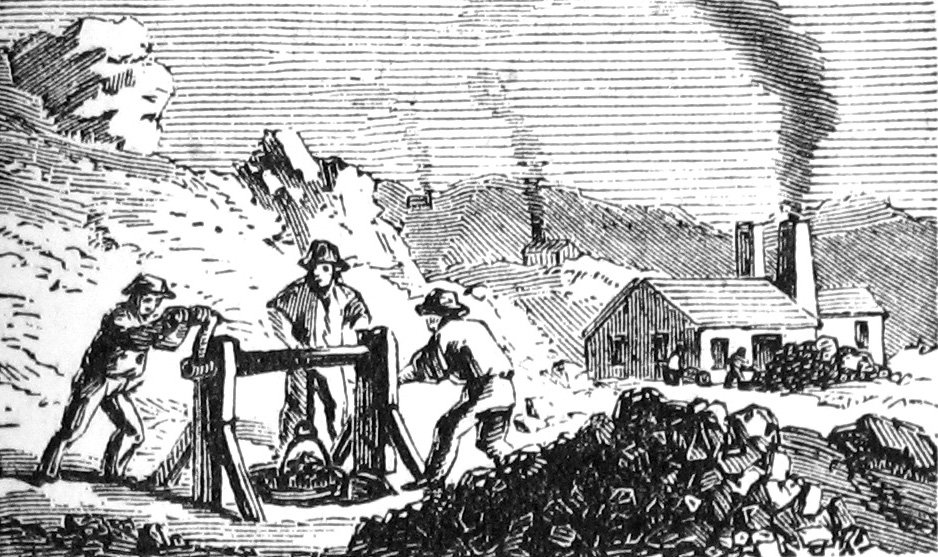
Lead mining in the upper Mississippi River region in the United States in 1865

In the second half of the 18th century, Britain, and later continental Europe and the United States, experienced the Industrial Revolution. This was the first time during which lead production rates exceeded those of Rome. Britain was the leading producer, losing this status by the mid-19th century with the depletion of its mines and the development of lead mining in Germany, Spain, and the United States. By 1900, the United States was the leader in global lead production, and other non-European nations—Canada, Mexico, and Australia—had begun significant production; production outside Europe exceeded that within. A great share of the demand for lead came from plumbing and painting—lead paints were in regular use. At this time, more (working class) people were exposed to the metal and lead poisoning cases escalated. This led to research into the effects of lead intake. Lead was proven to be more dangerous in its fume form than as a solid metal. Lead poisoning and gout were linked; British physician Alfred Baring Garrod noted a third of his gout patients were plumbers and painters. The effects of chronic ingestion of lead, including mental disorders, were also studied in the 19th century. The first laws aimed at decreasing lead poisoning in factories were enacted during the 1870s and 1880s in the United Kingdom.

== Modern era ==
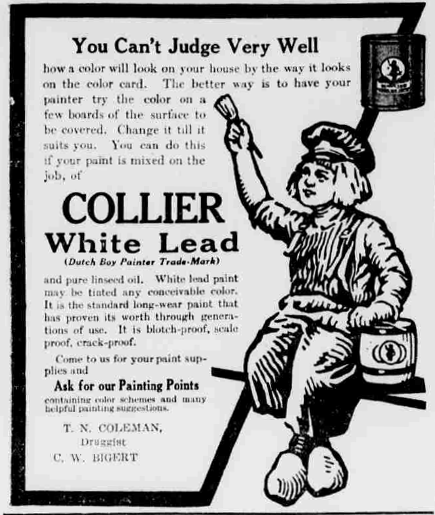
Promotional poster for Dutch Boy lead paint, United States, 1912

Further evidence of the threat that lead posed to humans was discovered in the late 19th and early 20th centuries. Mechanisms of harm were better understood, lead blindness was documented, and the element was phased out of public use in the United States and Europe. The United Kingdom introduced mandatory factory inspections in 1878 and appointed the first Medical Inspector of Factories in 1898; as a result, a 25-fold decrease in lead poisoning incidents from 1900 to 1944 was reported. Most European countries banned lead paint—commonly used because of its opacity and water resistance—for interiors by 1930.

The last major human exposure to lead was the addition of tetraethyllead to gasoline as an antiknock agent, a practice that originated in the United States in 1921. It was phased out in the United States and the European Union by 2000.

In the 1970s, the United States and Western European countries introduced legislation to reduce lead air pollution. The impact was significant: while a study conducted by the Centers for Disease Control and Prevention in the United States in 1976–1980 showed that 77.8% of the population had elevated blood lead levels, in 1991–1994, a study by the same institute showed the share of people with such high levels dropped to 2.2%. The main product made of lead by the end of the 20th century was the lead–acid battery.

From 1960 to 1990, lead output in the Western Bloc grew by about 31%. The share of the world's lead production by the Eastern Bloc increased from 10% to 30%, from 1950 to 1990, with the Soviet Union being the world's largest producer during the mid-1970s and the 1980s, and China starting major lead production in the late 20th century. Unlike the European communist countries, China was largely unindustrialized by the mid-20th century; in 2004, China surpassed Australia as the largest producer of lead. As was the case during European industrialization, lead has had a negative effect on health in China.

== See also ==
Tea lead

== Bibliography ==
- American Geophysical Union (2017). "Human Activity Has Polluted European Air for 2000 Years". Eos Science News. Archived from the original on 27 June 2017.
- Ashikari, M. (2003). "The memory of the women's white faces: Japaneseness and the ideal image of women". Japan Forum. 15 (1): 55–79. doi:10.1080/0955580032000077739. S2CID 144510689.
- Bisel, S. C.; Bisel, J. F. (2002). "Health and nutrition at Herculaneum". In Jashemski, W. F.; Meyer, F. G. (eds.). The Natural History of Pompeii. Cambridge University Press. pp. 451–75. ISBN 978-0-521-80054-9.
- Bisson, M. S.; Vogel, J. O. (2000). Ancient African Metallurgy: The Sociocultural Context. Rowman & Littlefield. ISBN 978-0-7425-0261-1.
- de Callataÿ, F. (2005). "The Graeco-Roman economy in the super long-run: Lead, copper, and shipwrecks". Journal of Roman Archaeology. 18: 361–72. doi:10.1017/S104775940000742X. S2CID 232346123.
- Calvo Rebollar, Miguel (2019). Construyendo la Tabla Periódica. Zaragoza, Spain: Prames. ISBN 978-84-8321-908-9.
- Ceccarelli, P. (2013). Ancient Greek Letter Writing: A Cultural History (600 BC- 150 BC). OUP Oxford. ISBN 978-0-19-967559-3.
- Centers for Disease Control and Prevention (1997). "Update: blood lead levels--United States, 1991-1994". Morbidity and Mortality Weekly Report. 46 (7): 141–146. ISSN 0149-2195. PMID 9072671.
- Chapurukha Kusimba (June 20, 2017). "Making Cents of Currency's Ancient Rise". Smithsonian Magazine.
- Cotnoir, B. (2006). The Weiser Concise Guide to Alchemy. Weiser Books. ISBN 978-1-57863-379-1.
- Crow, J. M. (2007). "Why use lead in paint?". Chemistry World. Royal Society of Chemistry.
- Delile, H.; Blichert-Toft, J.; Goiran, J.-P.; et al. (2014). "Lead in ancient Rome's city waters". Proceedings of the National Academy of Sciences. 111 (18): 6594–99. Bibcode:2014PNAS..111.6594D. doi:10.1073/pnas.1400097111. ISSN 0027-8424. PMC 4020092. PMID 24753588.
- Donnelly, J. (2014). Deep Blue. Hachette Children's Group. ISBN 978-1-4449-2119-9.
- Ede, A.; Cormack, L. B. (2016). A History of Science in Society, Volume I: From the Ancient Greeks to the Scientific Revolution, Third Edition. University of Toronto Press. ISBN 978-1-4426-3503-6.
- "Encyclopedia Judaica: Ossuaries and Sarcophagi". www.jewishvirtuallibrary.org.
- Eschnauer, H. R.; Stoeppler, M. (1992). "Wine—An enological specimen bank". In Stoeppler, M. (ed.). Hazardous Materials in the Environment. Elsevier Science. pp. 49–72 (58). doi:10.1016/s0167-9244(08)70103-3. ISBN 978-0-444-89078-8.
- Finger, S. (2006). Doctor Franklin's Medicine. University of Pennsylvania Press. ISBN 978-0-8122-3913-3.
- Frankenburg, F. R. (2014). Brain-Robbers: How Alcohol, Cocaine, Nicotine, and Opiates Have Changed Human History. ABC-CLIO. ISBN 978-1-4408-2932-1.
- Gilfillan, S. C. (1965). "Lead poisoning and the fall of Rome". Journal of Occupational Medicine. 7 (2): 53–60. ISSN 0096-1736. PMID 14261844.
- Gill, T.; Libraries Board of South Australia (1974). The history and topography of Glen Osmond, with map and illustrations. Libraries Board of South Australia. ISBN 9780724300358.
- Grout, J. (2017). "Lead poisoning and Rome". Encyclopaedia Romana.
- Hernberg, S. (2000). "Lead Poisoning in a Historical Perspective" (PDF). American Journal of Industrial Medicine. 38 (3): 244–54. doi:10.1002/1097-0274(200009)38:3<244::AID-AJIM3>3.0.CO;2-F. PMID 10940962. Archived from the original (PDF) on 21 September 2017.
- "A History of Cosmetics from Ancient Times". Cosmetics Info. Archived from the original on 14 July 2016.
- Hodge, T. A. (1981). "Vitruvius, lead pipes and lead poisoning". American Journal of Archaeology. 85 (4): 486–91. doi:10.2307/504874. JSTOR 504874. S2CID 193094209.
- Hong, S.; Candelone, J.-P.; Patterson, C. C.; et al. (1994). "Greenland ice evidence of hemispheric lead pollution two millennia ago by Greek and Roman civilizations" (PDF). Science. 265 (5180): 1841–43. Bibcode:1994Sci...265.1841H. doi:10.1126/science.265.5180.1841. PMID 17797222. S2CID 45080402. Archived from the original (PDF) on 29 April 2019.
- Kellett, C. (2012). Poison and Poisoning: A Compendium of Cases, Catastrophes and Crimes. Accent Press. ISBN 978-1-909335-05-9. Archived from the original on 9 June 2019.
- "Lead sling bullet; almond shape; a winged thunderbolt on one side and on the other, in high relief, the inscription DEXAI "Catch!"". The British Museum. Archived from the original on 14 February 2012.
- "Lead mining". The Northern Echo.
- Lewis, J. (1985). "Lead Poisoning: A Historical Perspective". EPA Journal. 11 (4): 15–18.
- Markowitz, G.; Rosner, D. (2000). ""Cater to the children": the role of the lead industry in a public health tragedy, 1900–55". American Journal of Public Health. 90 (1): 36–46. doi:10.2105/ajph.90.1.36. PMC 1446124. PMID 10630135.
- More, A. F.; Spaulding, N. E.; Bohleber, P.; et al. (2017). "Next-generation ice core technology reveals true minimum natural levels of lead (Pb) in the atmosphere: Insights from the Black Death" (PDF). GeoHealth. 1 (4): 211–219. Bibcode:2017GHeal...1..211M. doi:10.1002/2017GH000064. ISSN 2471-1403. PMC 7007106. PMID 32158988. Archived from the original (PDF) on 18 April 2020.
- Nakashima, T.; Hayashi, H.; Tashiro, H.; et al. (1998). "Gender and hierarchical differences in lead-contaminated Japanese bone from the Edo period". Journal of Occupational Health. 40 (1): 55–60. doi:10.1539/joh.40.55. S2CID 71451911.
- Neiburger, E.J. (April 2018). "X-Rays, Archaeology and the Chopsticks of Death". Central States Archaeological Journal. 65 (2): 70–74. JSTOR 44715698.
- Nriagu, J. O. (1983). "Saturnine gout among Roman aristocrats — Did lead poisoning contribute to the fall of the Empire?". The New England Journal of Medicine. 308 (11): 660–63. doi:10.1056/NEJM198303173081123. PMID 6338384.
- "surma". Oxford English Dictionary (2nd ed.). Oxford University Press. 2009.
- Polyanskiy, N. G. (1986). Fillipova, N. A (ed.). Аналитическая химия элементов: Свинец [Analytical Chemistry of the Elements: Lead] (in Russian). Nauka.
- Rabinowitz, M. B. (1995). "Imputing lead sources from blood lead isotope ratios". In Beard, M. E.; Allen Iske, S. D. (eds.). Lead in Paint, Soil, and Dust: Health Risks, Exposure Studies, Control Measures, Measurement Methods, and Quality Assurance. ASTM. pp. 63–75. doi:10.1520/stp12967s. ISBN 978-0-8031-1884-3.
- Ramage, C. K., ed. (1980). Lyman Cast Bullet Handbook (3rd ed.). Lyman Products Corporation.
- Reddy, A.; Braun, C. L. (2010). "Lead and the Romans". Journal of Chemical Education. 87 (10): 1052–55. Bibcode:2010JChEd..87.1052R. doi:10.1021/ed100631y.
- Retief, F.; Cilliers, L. P. (2006). "Lead poisoning in ancient Rome". Acta Theologica. 26 (2): 147–64 (149–51). doi:10.4314/actat.v26i2.52570.
- Rich, V. (1994). The International Lead Trade. Woodhead Publishing. ISBN 978-0-85709-994-5.
- Riva, M. A.; Lafranconi, A.; d'Orso, M. I.; et al. (2012). "Lead poisoning: Historical aspects of a paradigmatic "occupational and environmental disease"". Safety and Health at Work. 3 (1): 11–16. doi:10.5491/SHAW.2012.3.1.11. PMC 3430923. PMID 22953225.
- Samson, G. W. (1885). The divine law as to wines. J. B. Lippincott & Co.
- Scarborough, J. (1984). "The myth of lead poisoning among the Romans: An essay review". Journal of the History of Medicine and Allied Sciences. 39 (4): 469–475. doi:10.1093/jhmas/39.4.469. PMID 6389691.
- Sinha, S. P.; Shelly; Sharma, V.; et al. (1993). "Neurotoxic effects of lead exposure among printing press workers". Bulletin of Environmental Contamination and Toxicology. 51 (4): 490–93. Bibcode:1993BuECT..51..490S. doi:10.1007/BF00192162. PMID 8400649. S2CID 26631583.
- Thomson, T. (1830). The History of Chemistry. Henry Colburn and Richard Bentley (publishers). ISBN 9780405066238.
- Thornton, I.; Rautiu, R.; Brush, S. M. (2001). Lead: The Facts (PDF). International Lead Association. ISBN 978-0-9542496-0-1. Archived from the original (PDF) on 26 July 2020.
- Tungate, M. (2011). Branded Beauty: How Marketing Changed the Way We Look. Kogan Page Publishers. ISBN 978-0-7494-6182-9.
- United States Geological Survey (1973). Geological Survey Professional Paper. United States Government Publishing Office. p. 314.
- United States Geological Survey (2005). Lead (PDF) (Report). Archived from the original (PDF) on 12 April 2019.
- Vasmer, M. (1986–1987) [1950–1958]. Trubachyov, O. N.; Larin, B. O. (eds.). Этимологический словарь русского языка [Russisches etymologisches Worterbuch] (in Russian) (2nd ed.). Progress.
- Waldron, H. A. (1985). "Lead and lead poisoning in antiquity". Medical History. 29 (1): 107–08. doi:10.1017/S0025727300043878. PMC 1139494.
- Winder, C. (1993a). "The history of lead — Part 1". LEAD Action News. 2 (1). ISSN 1324-6011. Archived from the original on 31 August 2007.
- Winder, C. (1993b). "The history of lead — Part 3". LEAD Action News. 2 (3). ISSN 1324-6011. Archived from the original on 31 August 2007.
- Wood, J. R.; Hsu, Y-T.; Bell, C. (2021). "Sending Laurion Back to the Future: Bronze Age Silver and the Source of Confusion" (PDF). Internet Archaeology. 56 (9). doi:10.11141/ia.56.9. S2CID 236973111.
- Yu, L.; Yu, H. (2004). Chinese Coins: Money in History and Society. Long River Press. ISBN 978-1-59265-017-0.
- Zhang, X.; Yang, L.; Li, Y.; et al. (2012). "Impacts of lead/zinc mining and smelting on the environment and human health in China". Environmental Monitoring and Assessment. 184 (4): 2261–73. Bibcode:2012EMnAs.184.2261Z. doi:10.1007/s10661-011-2115-6. PMID 21573711. S2CID 20372810.
- "Toronto museum explores history of contraceptives". ABC News. 2003.
