= Lindy Durrant =

British immunologist

- Education: University of Manchester; Paterson Institute for Cancer Research
- Scientific career
- Workplaces: University of Nottingham; Scancell Ltd

Lindy Durrant is a British immunologist who is Professor of Cancer Immunotherapy at the University of Nottingham and Chief Scientific Officer and Chief Executive Officer of the UK AIM listed biotech company Scancell Ltd. Durrant's work focusses on harnessing the immune system to treat cancer and infectious disease. Across her career Durrant has developed a panel of monoclonal antibodies which recognise tumour associated glycans, pioneered novel antibody engineering technology to enhance the avidity of monoclonal antibodies as well as developed a number of different cancer vaccine platforms to target cancers such as melanoma, triple negative breast cancer, head and neck cancer amongst others.

== Early life and education ==
Durrant was an undergraduate student at the University of Manchester, where she studied biochemistry. She moved to the medical school, where she started working on cancer chemotherapy at the Paterson Institute for Cancer Research.

== Research and career ==
In 1983, Durrant joined the University of Nottingham as a postdoctoral scientist and continues to work at the University. She now holds the position of Professor of Cancer Immunotherapy as well as heading up the Nottingham University Therapeutic Antibody Centre (NUTAC) which produces monoclonal antibodies for cancer therapy. In 1997 Durrant founded the company Scancell - a biotechnology company focussed on harnessing the immune system to treat cancer. Through her work at Scancell, Durrant has gone on to develop two separate platforms to treat cancer through the stimulation of T cells to kill tumour cells. Firstly, a modular DNA vaccine platform ImmunoBody which was successfully trialled in melanoma (see SCIB1) as well as a peptide based cancer vaccine Moditope which targets stress-induced post-translational modifications. Both of these vaccines harness the immune system by inducing killer CD8 T cells and cytotoxic CD4 T cells to clear cancer cells from the body. She has also developed a number of different monoclonal antibodies which target tumour associated glycans, as well as identifying unique sequence residues in the Fc region that enable monoclonal antibodies to self-associate upon target recognition, resulting in more potent, high avidity antibodies.

During the COVID-19 pandemic Durrant and collaborators from the University of Nottingham and Nottingham Trent University created two COVID-19 vaccines based on the ImmunoBody DNA vaccine platform. These vaccines were designed to induce both neutralising antibody and T-cell responses directly against the covid-19 N- and S-proteins which in comparison to first-generation vaccines could help protect patients against different variants of Covid-19 as well as more broadly against other beta-coronaviruses. The vaccines are administered via spring-powered injectors which deliver a stream of fluid. It is expected that these vaccines would be able to induce a strong T-cell response against the conserved N-protein which would help achieve longer lasting immunity. The vaccines, which were supported by InnovateUK funding underwent clinical trials in 2021.

== Awards and honours ==
- 2019 Swedish Society of Oncology Waldenstrom Prize

== Selected publications ==
- Nicholas F S Watson; Judith M. Ramage; Zahra Madjd; Ian Spendlove; Ian Ellis; John H Scholefield; Lindy G Durrant (1 January 2006). "Immunosurveillance is active in colorectal cancer as downregulation but not complete loss of MHC class I expression correlates with a poor prognosis". International Journal of Cancer. 118 (1): 6–10. doi:10.1002/ijc.21303. ISSN 0020-7136. PMID 16003753. Wikidata Q53851520.
- Ekaterina S. Jordanova; Ekaterina S. Jordanova; Arko Gorter; et al. (1 April 2008). "Human leukocyte antigen class I, MHC class I chain-related molecule A, and CD8+/regulatory T-cell ratio: which variable determines survival of cervical cancer patients?". Clinical Cancer Research. 14 (7): 2028–2035. doi:10.1158/1078-0432.ccr-07-4554. ISSN 1078-0432. PMID 18381941. Wikidata Q54539424.
- Nicholas F S Watson; Ian Spendlove; Zahra Madjd; Roger McGilvray; Andrew R Green; Ian O Ellis; John H Scholefield; Lindy G Durrant (1 March 2006). "Expression of the stress-related MHC class I chain-related protein MICA is an indicator of good prognosis in colorectal cancer patients". International Journal of Cancer. 118 (6): 1445–1452. doi:10.1002/ijc.21510. ISSN 0020-7136. PMID 16184547. Wikidata Q50753300.
