= Union for International Cancer Control =

Non-governmental organisation

- Abbreviation: UICC
- Formation: 1933; 93 years ago
- Type: INGO
- Region served: Worldwide
- Official language: English
- President: Zainab Shinkafi-Bagudu, Nigeria
- Affiliations: World Health Organization (WHO)
- Website: www.uicc.org

The Union for International Cancer Control (UICC) is a non-governmental organisation dedicated to reducing the burden of cancer around the world. Founded in Paris in 1933 and headquartered in Geneva, Switzerland, it is considered the oldest and largest organisation of its kind, with more than 1,100 members in over 170 countries and territories.

UICC created the TNM Classification of Malignant Tumours, the global standard used by clinicians to stage cancer, publishes the International Journal of Cancer and organises World Cancer Day, held annually on 4 February. UICC holds consultative status with the United Nations Economic and Social Council and maintains official relations with the World Health Organization, the International Agency for Research on Cancer and the International Atomic Energy Agency.

== History ==
UICC was established in Paris in 1933 following a proposal at a cancer congress in Madrid to create an international organisation that would promote the fight against cancer through research, therapy and the development of social activities. It was given the Latin name Unio Internationalis Contra Cancrum, hence the acronym UICC, which was retained in 2010 when the organisation's English name changed from the International Union Against Cancer to Union for International Cancer Control, aligning it with the French, Spanish and Latin versions of the name. The first General Assembly took place in Paris on 4 May 1935, with representatives from 67 national cancer organisations and 43 countries. UICC moved its headquarters to Geneva in 1948 to be close the global health organisations.

The 1933 Madrid congress is considered the first International Cancer Congress. Further congresses followed irregularly, including one in 1939 that preceded a suspension of UICC's activities during the Second World War. Congresses resumed in 1947 and the fifth one was held in 1950. From this date, the event, later renamed the World Cancer Congress, was held every four years until 2006 and every two years since, alongside UICC's General Assembly. The 28th edition will take place in Hong Kong in September 2026.

UICC's scientific and public health work also dates from this period: in 1953, UICC established a Special Committee on Clinical Stage Classification under the Chairmanship of Prof. Pierre Denoix, who had developed between 1943 and 1952 what has become the globally recognised standard for classifying the extent of the spread of cancer tumours in a person’s body: the TNM Classification of Malignant Tumours (TNM). UICC has since continuously updated and published the TNM Classification, now in its 9th edition. In 1962, it launched a fellowships programme for cancer professionals that continues to this day. In 1966, UICC established the International Journal of Cancer as its official scientific publication.

In the 21st century, UICC embarked on new directions, with convening, capacity building, and advocacy at the core of its activities. It launched the first World Cancer Declaration at the World Cancer Congress in Washington in 2006 and co-founded the International Cancer Control Partnership in 2012. In 2022, UICC launched the Access to Oncology Medicines Coalition to address the barriers to availability, affordability and appropriate use of oncology medicines in low- and lower-middle income countries (LLMICs). In 2025, it published the ninth edition of the TNM Classification and launched the World Cancer Declaration 2025–2035.

== Governance ==
UICC is governed by its member organisations, which meet in a general assembly every two years. Between general assemblies, a board of directors of 16 members, elected at the general assembly, acts as the organisation's executive body. It is headed by the President of UICC, a position currently held by Ulrika Årehed Kågström. Zainab Shinkafi-Bagudu was elected President-elect for the same term and is due to take over the presidency in October 2026.

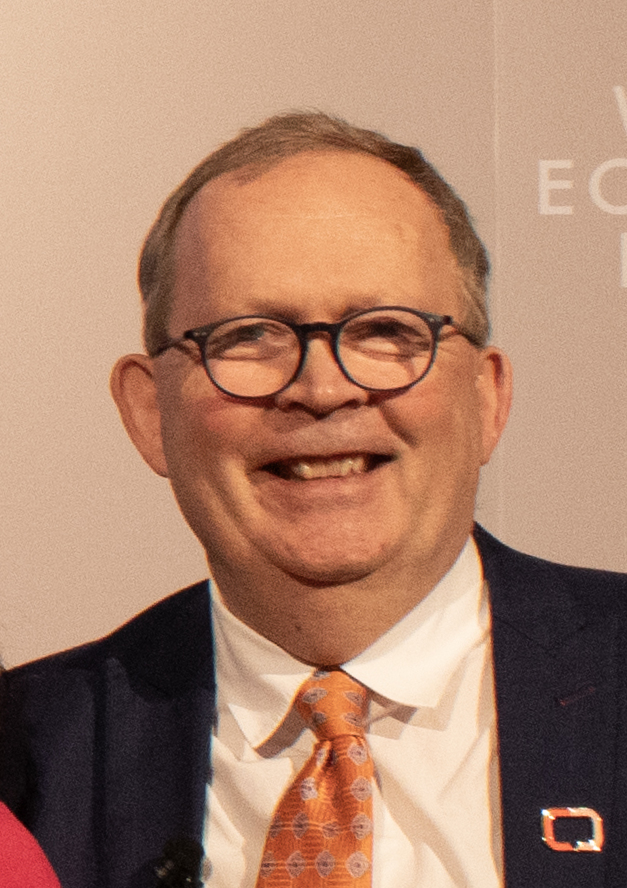
Cary Adams, CEO of UICC since 2009

The organisation is run day-to-day by a chief executive officer with a staff of around 40 employees, based in Geneva. Cary Adams has held the position of chief executive officer since 2009.

Presidents of UICC
Years	Name (Country)
2026-2028	Zainab Shinkafi-Bagudu (Nigeria)
2024-2026	Ulrika Årehed Kågström (Sweden)
2022-2024	Prof. Jeff Dunn, AO (Australia)
2020–2022	Prof. Anil D’Cruz (India)
2018–2020	HRH Princess Dina Mired of Jordan (Jordan)
2016–2018	Prof. Sanchia Aranda (Australia)
2014–2016	Prof. Tezer Kutluk (Turkey)
2012–2014	Prof. Mary Gospodarowicz (Canada)
2010–2012	Dr Eduardo Cazap (Argentina)
2008–2010	Dr David Hill (Australia)
2006–2008	Dr Franco Cavalli (Switzerland)
2002–2006	Dr John Seffrin (US)
1998–2002	Dr E. Robinson (Israel)
1994–1998	Dr N. J. Gray (Australia)
1990–1994	Prof. S. Eckhardt (Hungary)
1986–1990	Prof. C. G. Schmidt (Germany)
1982–1986	Prof. Antonio Junqueira (Brazil)
1978–1982	Prof. U. Veronesi (Italy)
1974–1978	Prof P. Denoix (France)
1970–1974	Dr W. U. Gardner (US)
1966–1970	Dr N. N. Blokhin (USSR)
1962–1966	Prof. A. Haddow (United Kingdom)
1958–1962	Dr V. R. Khanolkar (India)
1953–1958	Prof. J. H. Maisin (Belgium)
1935–1953	M. J. Godart (France)

== Mission and activities ==
UICC's official mission statement states that it unites and supports the cancer community to reduce the global cancer burden, to promote greater equity and to ensure that cancer control continues to be a priority in the world health and development agenda. It pursues this mission primarily by uniting and supporting the global cancer community on one hand and driving global action on the other. The organisation focuses on four types of activity: convening the cancer community at global events, building the capacity of member organisations through training and funding, sharing scientific and policy knowledge and advocating for cancer control at national and international level.

It focuses on six priority areas – member centricity, access to cancer care, health systems for cancer, people-centred care, women’s cancer and lung cancer – while also working on multiple other cancer control areas such as tobacco control, antimicrobial resistance, cancer and air pollution, supportive care.

UICC convenes the cancer community at events such as the World Cancer Congress and the World Cancer Leaders' Summit, organises thematic webinars, and provides training, fellowships and grants, while advocating for effective cancer control. It is also behind World Cancer Day, an international awareness day marked every year on 4 February.

World Cancer Declaration

UICC and its members work towards addressing the World Cancer Declaration, a framework of measurable targets for global cancer control, first launched at the World Cancer Congress in Washington in 2006 and periodically renewed. Its current iteration, the World Cancer Declaration 2025–2035, was launched at the World Cancer Leaders' Summit in Melbourne in November 2025. It outlines a series of targets to reduce cancer mortality and improve equitable access to cancer prevention, diagnosis, treatment, and care.

Scientific publications

The peer-reviewed medical journal International Journal of Cancer has been the official journal of UICC since 1966 and covers topics in experimental and clinical cancer research.

UICC also published, with Wiley, "Cancer systems and control for health professionals", which explores how cancer care integrates into general health systems.

The open-access journal JCO Global Oncology has been published in partnership with the American Society of Clinical Oncology since 2015.

UICC published the TNM Classification of Malignant Tumors in 1953 as the "Uniform Technique for a Clinical Classification by the TNM System", with the first pocket book edition issued in 1968. The Classification has been regularly updated and the 8th edition was published with John Wiley and Sons (Wiley) in 2017.

UICC TNM Classification of Malignant Tumors

UICC first published the TNM Classification of Malignant Tumors in 1953, initially as the "Uniform Technique for a Clinical Classification by the TNM System", with the first pocket-book edition issued in 1968. The TNM Classification of Malignant Tumours, the global standard for cancer staging, is regularly reviewed and updated by the UICC TNM Project. Its ninth edition was published with John Wiley and Sons in 2025.

== Member organisations, partners and other networks ==
UICC has more than 1,100 member organisations, including cancer societies, governmental agencies, treatment and research centres, patient support groups and professional associations in over 170 countries and territories.

The organisation also works with more than 80 partners, including other health organisations, associations, foundations and private sector companies committed to reducing the global cancer burden. UICC enjoys consultative status with the United Nations (ECOSOC) and has official relations with the following institutions: World Health Organization, International Agency for Research on Cancer, International Atomic Energy Agency and the United Nations Office of Drugs and Crime.

UICC is a founding member of the NCD Alliance, the McCabe Centre for Law & Cancer and the International Cancer Control Partnership (ICCP). UICC established the City Cancer Challenge Foundation in January 2019 and the Access to Oncology Medicines (ATOM) Coalition in 2022.

== See also ==
- American Cancer Society Cancer Action Network
- American Society of Clinical Oncology
- World Cancer Day
- World Health Organization
