= Brain Tumor Social Media =

Brain Tumor Social Media (#BTSM) was a patient and care partner-run, grassroots online community. The BlueSky account @BTSMchat.bsky.social and the X account @BTSMchat hosted quarterly online chats for the #BTSM community (the X/Bluesky equivalent of a cancer support group) and consistently trended among the top 15 of disease-related online chats. A study published in 2020 revealed the hashtag was most commonly used by brain tumor patients (33.13%), along with patient advocacy organizations (7.01%), care partners (4.63%), and clinicians (3.63%) and researchers (3.37%) specializing in brain tumors and brain cancers.

The Brain Tumor Social Media hashtag "#BTSM" was introduced to the medical community in "Disease-Specific Hashtags for Online Communication About Cancer Care" published in JAMA Oncology, and later covered as a case study in maintaining a successful online health-oriented community (published in JCO Clinical Cancer Informatics). Guidelines for neuro-oncology professionals interacting with patients on social media were introduced in the journal Neuro-Oncology.

The #BTSM hashtag represented benign and malignant brain tumors for adult and pediatric patients. In a 2016 interview for CURE magazine, #BTSM organizer @TheLizArmy said, "There are over 120 different brain tumors… I liked the idea of an inclusive group for everyone with brain tumors where we can all share our experiences."

On December 7, 2025, the moderators and co-founders of #BTSM made a group decision to sunset their regular chats. Reasons included significant changes in the social media landscape as well changes in the personal and professional lives of the moderators and volunteers. In a statement posted to LinkedIn--and cross-posted to BlueSky and X/Twitter--#BTSM organizers shared their reasoning for these decisions, saying, "Now we leave the future in your hands. May the next generation brain tumor community stumble across these old transcripts, create support networks beyond our wildest dreams, and build something new one day."

== Background ==
Brain Tumor Social Media (#BTSM) was a grassroots Twitter community founded by brain tumor patients who were inspired by a breast cancer community tweeting with the hashtag #BCSM (Breast Cancer Social Media). The #BTSM hashtag community was not owned or affiliated with any organization or nonprofit, and was organized by volunteers who are brain tumor patients and care partners.

=== History ===
In a 2012 post on her blog, X (formerly Twitter) user @TheLizArmy said she had the idea to start a brain tumor-specific hashtag after observing a Breast Cancer Social Media (#BCSM) tweet chat, writing, "A new hashtag has been established tonight #btsm, for Brain Tumor Social Media - a spin-off of the popular #bcsm used by breast cancer peeps." Brain tumor patient @cblotner_ tweeted at @TheLizArmy by using the hashtag #BTSM from his hospital room after awake craniotomy. Inspired by the real-time conversations being had in the breast cancer community, @cblotner_ started the first #BTSM live tweet chat in May 2013.

#BTSM was among many healthcare hashtag communities growing on X/Twitter from 2013 - 2023. "Healthcare Twitter" had its own culture which includes discussing specific topics, disseminating research, sharing information, and advocacy. The chat continued to exist after Twitter became X on July 23, 2023. Due to many patient and care partner advocates as well as clinical and research participants moving away from the platform, organizer @Sabine-NJ suggested to fellow co-hosts @Project2program, @mcintose, @Seancarey42, and @Stuartselby, to also host #BTSMchats on BlueSky in 2025. The first #skychat took place on March 30, 2025.

== Monthly #BTSM tweet chat ==
#BTSM chats on X/Twitter took place on the first Sunday of each month at 4pm PT/7pm ET, with the group later migrated to BlueSky . The live chat was a virtual form of a cancer support group. Users of the platforms could participate in the chats by tagging their posts with the hashtag #BTSM. The chats were open to the public. Typical #BTSM chat participants were platform users who were interested in brain tumors, including people who have been diagnosed with a brain tumor (patients), care partners of brain tumor patients, medical professionals, researchers, advocates, and community healthcare organization members.

== Research with #BTSM ==
Academic clinicians and researchers partnered with #BTSM patients and care partners to better understand brain tumor community member needs, and publish their findings in academic and medical journals.

=== Twitter analytics ===
A study published in the Journal of Medical Internet Research analyzed the use of the #BTSM hashtag from its inception in 2012 through 2018 and tracked its usage and adoption by various stakeholders (e.g., patients, care partners, clinicians, researchers, advocacy organizations). This study described the adoption of the #BTSM hashtag increasing by clinicians over time, but decreasing among care partners.

=== Quality of life, advance care planning, and palliative care ===
In 2018, researchers collaborated with brain tumor patients and care partners by using #BTSM to better understand how people facing brain tumors define quality of life. Those participating in the chat shared that quality of life for brain tumor patients and care partners encompassed psychosocial concerns in addition to more obvious physical and cognitive concerns. The predominant quality of life themes expressed by patients and care partners included behavioral changes, grief over loss of identity, changes in relationships, depression, and anxiety. A strong theme identified in the analysis was that, "Quality of life is defined by the individual, may evolve over time, and is important for everyone—not just those with a terminal diagnosis or nearing the end of life."

Research published in the Journal of Palliative Medicine analyzed the transcript of a #BTSM chat in January 2018 to better understand brain tumor stakeholder perspectives on advance care planning; one of the key themes that emerged from the analysis was related to concerns about discussing advance care planning too early or too late in a brain tumor diagnosis.

== See also ==
- hashtag activism
- cancer support group
- e-patient
- stakeholder engagement
