= Bisel =

Bisel may refer to:

== People ==
- Harry Bisel (1918–1994), American oncologist
- Sara C. Bisel (1932–1996), American anthropologist and archaeologist

== Places ==
- Bisel, Haut-Rhin, Alsace, France
