= JCO Oncology Practice =

- Discipline: Oncology
- Language: English
- Edited by: Jeffrey Peppercorn

Publication details
- Former name: Journal of Oncology Practice
- History: 2005–present
- Publisher: ASCO Publications (United States)
- Frequency: Monthly
- Impact factor: 5.5 (2025)

Standard abbreviations
- ISO 4: JCO Oncol. Pract.

Indexing
- ISSN: 2688-1527 (print); 2688-1535 (web)
- OCLC no.: 1346736610

Links
- Journal homepage; Online access; Online archive

JCO Oncology Practice (known from 2005 to 2019 as the Journal of Oncology Practice) is a monthly peer-reviewed medical journal covering the mechanics of oncology care. It was established in 2005 and is published by the American Society of Clinical Oncology. The editor-in-chief is Jeffrey Peppercorn (Massachusetts General Hospital).

== History ==
The first issue was managed by then-editor in chief Douglas Blayney (Stanford University), and was published in May 2005 featuring "... material on oncologic best practice methods originated by our colleagues, who may care for patients in office, hospital out-patient, academic, or home-care settings. These pieces may be first-authored, multi-authored, or may result from interviews by our staff." Blayney was succeeded by John V. Cox (University of Texas Southwestern) in 2008.

== Abstracted and indexing ==
The journal is abstracting and indexed in:

- Science Citation Index Expanded
- Index Medicus/MEDLINE/PubMed
- Scopus
- EMBASE
- CINAHL

== See also ==
- Journal of Clinical Oncology
- JCO Clinical Cancer Informatics
- JCO Global Oncology
