= BTSM =

BTSM or Btsm can stand for:

- Bootsmann, a naval rank
- Black Tiger Sex Machine, a Canadian industrial/EDM band
- Brain Tumor Social Media (#BTSM), a healthcare hashtag community on Twitter.
