= MOMS Club =

Support group

MOMS Club is a support group for stay-at-home moms. MOMS is an acronym for Moms Offering Moms Support.

== History ==
MOMS Club was founded in 1985 by Mary James, a stay-at-home mother of two from California. Weary of being home alone all day, James wanted to connect with other at-home moms in her area. She also desired playmates for her children. When she discovered that there were no existing organizations that met during the day and that designed activities for moms and children to enjoy together, she decided to start her own group. Based on the success of this initial chapter, MOMS Club spread throughout the country. Today, there are 973 chapters in the United States, as well as international chapters.

== Activities ==
Although activities vary by chapter, most clubs offer some form of the following: monthly meetings, playgroups, mom's nights out, holiday parties, field trips, community speakers and service projects.

== Controversy ==
In June 2020, MOMS Club of Rancho Santa Margarita submitted a collage of pictures with an anti-racist message and requested it be posted to the International Chapter's Facebook page. The collage spelled out "We. Stand. With. All. Moms. And. Pledge. That. Racial. Discrimination. Will. Stop. With. Our. Kids." and was created following the murder of George Floyd and the protests that followed. The international organization declined to share the image on their Facebook page with the reasoning that the message was political and could jeopardize the non-profit status of the organization.

After push-back, the International MOMS Club responded that "graphics like that collage ... imply that our members have been racists before now. The MOMS Club has never been a racist organization and never will be. To imply otherwise is not acceptable." In response, hundreds of women and chapters across the country left the organization.

Per the MOMS Club bylaws, chapters do not seek political and religious focus, instead the chapters are geared towards what binds mothers together, which is: the sisterhood of motherhood, children and community.
