= Zainab Shinkafi Bagudu =

Nigerian consultant pediatrician (born 1968)

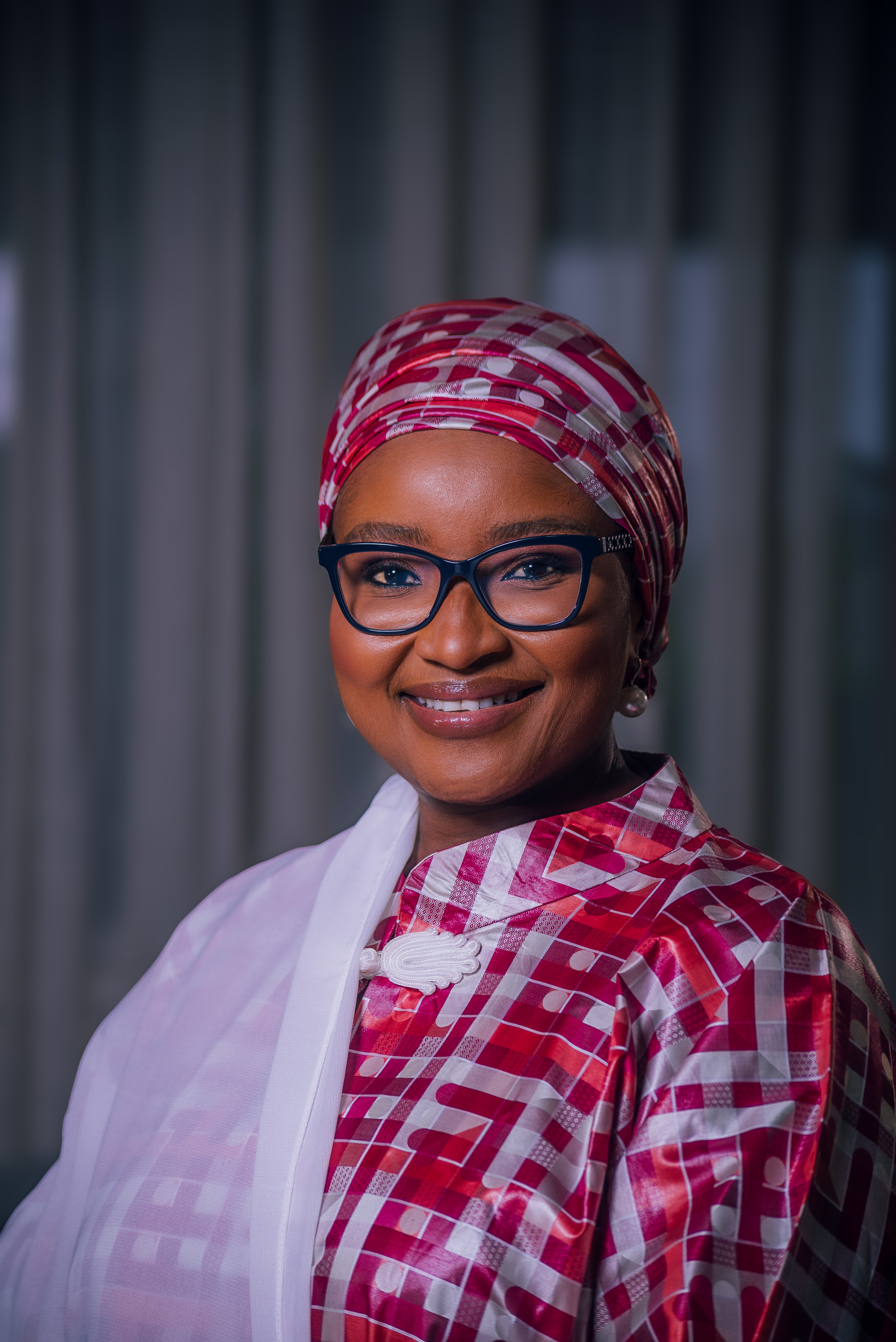
- Born: March 27, 1968 (age 58); Lagos
- Occupations: Cancer advocate and pediatrician
- Spouse: Abubakar Atiku Bagudu
- Children: 2
- Website: https://drzainabbagudu.org/

Zainab Shinkafi Bagudu (born 27 March 1968) is a global cancer advocate with interest in women's health. Founder of the MedicAid Cancer Foundation, she advocates for cancer awareness by providing training for healthcare workers, and supports the screening, diagnosis and treatment of cancer patients in Nigeria. She is a columnist at the Blueprint Newspaper and the president-elect of the Union for International Cancer Control. She is also a consultant pediatrician.

== Early life and education ==
Zainab Shinkafi Bagudu was born on born 27 March 1968 in Lagos to her mother Rakiya Shinkafi and her father Umaru Shinkafi, a former police officer She completed her elementary education in Queens College Lagos and graduated in 1984. She went on to obtain an MBBS (Bachelor of Medicine) at Ahmadu Bello University in Zaria. She obtained a Masters in pediatrics and a diploma in tropical child health at the London School of Hygiene and Tropical Medicine. She is currently a member of the Royal College of Pediatrics and Child Health (RCPCH) in London.

=== Family life ===
Bagudu is married to Senator Abubakar Atiku Bagudu, the Minister of Budget and Economic Planning of Nigeria, and former governor of Kebbi State. She has two children.

== Cancer advocacy and philanthropy ==
Zainab Shinkafi Bagudu founded the MedicAid Cancer Foundation in 2009 in Nigeria. She has dedicated over 15 years to advancing cancer awareness and support, focusing on its impact on women and children in Nigeria. Since the foundation's establishment, her efforts have reached a large number of people through various outreach initiatives, including an annual one million-walk away cancer awareness march in Nigeria and awareness march, along with a social media campaign called #WalkAwayCancer. Through the foundation, she has also organized numerous free diagnostic screening programs and provided free cancer treatment to many individuals through her programs.

Bagudu serves on the board of directors for the Union for International Cancer Control (UICC) and the advisory board of the Global Initiative Against HPV and Cervical Cancer (GIAHC). She is a member of the Nigerian Cancer Society and the American Society for Clinical Oncology. She also contributes to global cancer awareness through the WHO's Global Breast Cancer Initiative Technical Working Group and serves as an Ambassador for World Ovarian Cancer Coalition.

Bagudu became the president-elect of the UICC in 2024, and is expected to become its president in October 2026.

== Awards and recognition ==
- Silverbird Man of the Year award for Special Achievements – 2016
- Merit award for her advocacy work by the Nigerian Medical Association (NMA) – 2018
- Global Health Distinguished Leader award at the 2023 Global Health Catalyst (GHC) Summit – 2023
- Dicey Scroggins Distinguished Advocate Award from the International Gynecologic Cancer Society (IGCS) – 2024
