= Mary Gospodarowicz =

Canadian oncologist

Professor Mary Gospodarowicz OC FRCPC
- Born: Gdańsk, Poland

Academic background
- Education: MD, 1971, University of Toronto Faculty of Medicine

Academic work
- Institutions: University of Toronto; Princess Margaret Cancer Centre

Mary K. Gospodarowicz Evans is a Canadian radiation oncologist. She is a Professor at the University of Toronto and the past Medical Director at the Princess Margaret Cancer Centre.

== Early life and education ==
Gospodarowicz began her medical studies in Poland, her native country, before immigrating to Canada and enrolling at the University of Toronto Faculty of Medicine.

== Career ==
Upon graduating from the University of Toronto, Gospodarowicz became involved in cooperative group studies and chaired the genitourinary trial committee for the National Cancer Institute of Canada trial group. Following this, she became interested in precision radiotherapy and accepted a leadership role as Chair of Princess Margaret Cancer Centre's Department of Radiation Oncology in Toronto. In 2003, Gospodarowicz was the recipient of the inaugural Professional Development and Continuing Medical Education Award.

In 2012, Gospodarowicz became the first Canadian and first woman to serve as president of the Union for International Cancer Control (UICC). She also received the 2012 CMA May Cohen Award for Women Mentors. In recognition of her oncologist efforts, Gospodarowicz was the recipient of the Lifetime Achievement Award from the European Society for Radiotherapy and Oncology and the 2013 Janeway Medal from the American Radium Society. By 2014, Gospodarowicz was awarded the 2014 American Society for Radiation Oncology as a "distinguished member who has made outstanding contributions to the field of Radiation Oncology, including research, clinical care, teaching and service."

As the medical director at the Princess Margaret Cancer Centre, Gospodarowicz was awarded the Order of Canada "for contributing to improved cancer radiotherapy and for her leadership in advancing cancer care around the world." She was later named the 2016 recipient of the Canadian Cancer Society Research Institute's O. Harold Warwick Prize. In honour of her academic research, Gospodarowicz was promoted to the rank of University Professor at the University of Toronto and was presented with the 2017 Women Who Conquer Cancer Mentorship Award from the Conquer Cancer Foundation.

== Personal life ==
Gospodarowicz and her husband David have two children together.
