= Harry Bisel =

American oncologist

Harry F. Bisel, M.D. (1918–1994) was an American oncologist. With Fred Ansfield, Herman Freckman, Arnoldus Goudsmit, Robert Talley, William Wilson, and Jane Wright, was one of the founding members of the American Society of Clinical Oncology (ASCO). This group of pioneering doctors, through the formation of ASCO, is largely credited with the development of modern American clinical oncology. In 1964, Bisel was elected the first president of ASCO. He was active in the American Cancer Society and was a consultant to the National Cancer Institute. Bisel was a founding member of the American Society of Preventive Oncology as well as the American Association for Cancer Education.

== Life and education ==
He was born on June 17, 1918, in Manor, Pennsylvania. He attended Peabody High School and the University of Pittsburgh. There, he received the MD degree in 1942. Dr. Bisel did graduate work at the University of Pennsylvania and Harvard Medical School. He was one of the first trainees to graduate from the Memorial Sloan-Kettering Medical Neoplasia Center. In 1971, Dr. Bisel received the Hench Award from the University of Pittsburgh School of Medicine.

He was in the United States Navy Reserve from 1942 to 1978, and on active duty from 1943 to 1947. During World War II, he was a flight surgeon and was awarded three battle stars for action in the Pacific.

Dr. Bisel was the first formally trained oncologist hired by the Mayo Clinic. He was on staff from 1963 until he retired in 1983. He founded the Mayo Clinic Section of Medical Oncology, and was chairmen from 1963 to 1972. He also served as a faculty member of the Mayo Graduate School of Medicine and the Mayo Medical School.

He married Sara C. Bisel and had three children: Jane, Clark and Harold.

== Selected review papers ==
- Bisel, Harry F. (1953). "Incidence and Clinical Manifestations of Cardiac Metastases". JAMA: The Journal of the American Medical Association. 153 (8): 712–5. doi:10.1001/jama.1953.02940250018005. ISSN 0098-7484. PMID 13096280.
- Bisel HF, Ansfield FJ, Mason JH, Wilson WL (January 1970). "Clinical studies with tubercidin administered by direct intravenous injection". Cancer Research. 30 (1): 76–8. PMID 4917978.
- Ahmann DL, Hahn RG, Bisel HF (November 1972). "A comparative study of 1-(2-chloroethyl)-3-cyclohexyl-1-nitrosourea (NSC 79037) and imidazole carboxamide (NSC 45388) with vincristine (NSC 67574) in the palliation of disseminated malignant melanoma". Cancer Research. 32 (11): 2432–4. PMID 5082592.
- Ahmann, David L.; Bisel, Harry F.; Hahn, Richard G.; Eagan, Robert T.; Edmonson, John H.; Steinfeld, Jesse L.; Tormey, Douglass C.; Taylor, William F. (2010). "An analysis of a multiple-drug program in the treatment of patients with advanced breast cancer utilizing 5-fluorouracil, cyclophosphamide, and prednisone with or without vincristine". Cancer. 36 (6): 1925–1935. doi:10.1002/cncr.2820360601. ISSN 0008-543X. PMID 1203855. S2CID 221581571.
- Ingle JN, Krook JE, Green SJ, et al. (February 1986). "Randomized trial of bilateral oophorectomy versus tamoxifen in premenopausal women with metastatic breast cancer". Journal of Clinical Oncology. 4 (2): 178–85. doi:10.1200/jco.1986.4.2.178. PMID 3511184.
- Bisel, Harry F. (1980). "Management of locally advanced and disseminated breast cancer—chemotherapy". Cancer. 46 (S4): 1079–1083. doi:10.1002/1097-0142(19800815)46:4+<1079::AID-CNCR2820461337>3.0.CO;2-6. ISSN 0008-543X.
