= Lori J. Pierce =

American radiation oncologist

- Born: Washington, D.C., U.S.
- Education: University of Pennsylvania (BS); Duke University (MD)
- Scientific career
- Fields: Radiation oncology
- Workplaces: University of Michigan; National Cancer Institute; University of Pennsylvania

Lori Jo Pierce is an American radiation oncologist and professor at the University of Michigan. Her research concerns radiotherapy for breast cancer.

Pierce served as the 57th president of the American Society of Clinical Oncology (ASCO) in 2020–2021.

== Early life and education ==
Pierce graduated from the University of Pennsylvania in 1979 with a bachelor's degree in biomedical engineering and a minor in chemical engineering. She received her medical degree from Duke University in 1985. Pierce completed an internship at Thomas Jefferson University Hospital in Philadelphia and later a residency in radiation oncology at the Hospital of the University of Pennsylvania.

== Career and research ==
Pierce was an assistant professor at the University of Pennsylvania from 1989 to 1990. She then worked as a senior investigator in the Radiation Oncology Branch of the National Cancer Institute from 1990 to 1992. In 1992, she joined the faculty of the University of Michigan, where she later became a tenured professor of radiation oncology.

At Michigan, Pierce served as director of the radiation oncology residency program and as clinical director of the Department of Radiation Oncology. She directed the Michigan Radiation Oncology Quality Consortium, a statewide program that collects treatment and outcome data from radiation oncology practices.

From 2005 to 2024, Pierce served in the University of Michigan provost's office, including as vice provost for academic and faculty affairs.

On July 16, 2026, the Regents of the University of Michigan approved the appointment of Pierce as the Allen S. Lichter Distinguished University Professor of Radiation Oncology, effective September 1, 2026.

== Academic research ==
Her research has examined breast-conserving treatment, radiation planning intended to reduce cardiac exposure, radiosensitizing agents, hereditary breast cancer, and racial disparities in breast cancer outcomes. The National Academy of Medicine cited her work combining medical physics and laboratory research in the development of breast cancer radiation treatments when it elected her as a member in 2018.

Pierce was elected to the National Academy of Medicine in 2018. In 2021, she received the Gold Medal of the American Society for Radiation Oncology.
