= JCO Global Oncology =

- Discipline: Oncology
- Language: English

Publication details
- Former name: Journal of Global Oncology
- History: Since 2015
- Publisher: Lippincott, Williams & Wilkins
- Frequency: Monthly
- Impact factor: 3.3 (2024)

Standard abbreviations
- ISO 4: JCO Glob. Oncol.

Indexing
- ISSN: 2687-8941
- OCLC no.: 1107049854
- Journal of Global Oncology
- ISSN: 2378-9506
- LCCN: 2015200370
- OCLC no.: 908339121

Links
- Journal homepage; Online access; Online archive

JCO Global Oncology is a peer-reviewed open-access medical journal covering cancer care, research, and care delivery issues unique to countries and settings with limited healthcare resources. It was established in 2015 as the Journal of Global Oncology, obtaining its current name in 2020. It is published by Lippincott Williams & Wilkins on behalf of the American Society of Clinical Oncology and the editor-in-chief is Katherine Van Loon (University of California, San Francisco).

== Abstracting and indexing ==
The journal is abstracted and indexed in:

- CAB Abstracts
- Directory of Open Access Journals
- EBSCO databases
- Embase
- Emerging Sources Citation Index
- Index Medicus/MEDLINE/PubMed
- Scopus

According to the Journal Citation Reports, the journal has a 2024 impact factor of 3.3.

== See also ==
- Journal of Clinical Oncology
- JCO Clinical Cancer Informatics
- Journal of Oncology Practice
