= Fred J. Ansfield =

Oncologist, clinical researcher (b. 1910, d. 1996)

Fred Joseph Ansfield, M.D. (1910 - 1996) was an American pioneer of medical oncology. He was a leader in applying 5-FU (5-Fluorouracil) to humans, demonstrating its effectiveness as a chemotherapy drug. Ansfield co-founded the American Society of Clinical Oncology (ASCO) in 1964, along with Harry Bisel, Arnoldus Goudsmit, Herman H. Freckman, Robert W. Talley, William Wilson and Jane Cooke Wright. He served as ASCO's third president (1966–1967).

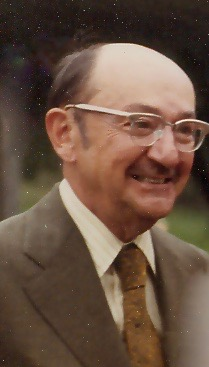
Dr. Fred J Ansfield

"He shall be remembered by cancer treatment specialists everywhere as one of the founders of Medical Oncology."

== Early life ==
Ansfield was born on August 30, 1910, in Milwaukee, Wisconsin. By age 13, both of his parents had died from cancer, steering him towards medicine and cancer research. He attended the University of Wisconsin, receiving his bachelor's degree in 1931. During this period he first had the idea to use mice to find a cure for mammary cancer in animals.

Ansfield received his M.D. in 1933 from the University of Wisconsin Medical School. After his internship and residency training at Milwaukee County Hospital, Ansfield became a camp physician for the Civilian Conservation Corps near Glidden, Wisconsin. He entered private practice there in 1936, with the goal of saving enough money to fund his mouse experiments. During World War II, Ansfield served in the U.S. Army Medical Corps as a battalion surgeon for the 11th Airborne division in the Philippines and New Guinea. He earned the Bronze Star, Silver Star and Purple Heart. After the war, he returned to practice in Glidden, Wisconsin.

In 1952 Ansfield began discussing the idea of using the immune system in cancer therapy with his former medical school classmate, Dr. Harold Rusch, then head of the McArdle Memorial Laboratory at the University of Wisconsin. Dr. Rusch helped Dr. Ansfield get started with mouse surgery experiments by providing lab space and equipment. Drs. Ansfield and Rusch designed and began a series of immunotherapy experiments for testing tumors in mice.

In 1957, Dr. Ansfield joined the University of Wisconsin's faculty in an instructor position in the clinical oncology division of the Department of Surgery. His first faculty assignment was testing 5-FU (5-Fluorouracil), a new drug conceptualized and developed by Professor Charles Heidelberger of the McArdle Laboratory. "It was just after he arrived here [Madison] that Dr. Ansfield proposed that dosages of a new drug, 5-Fluorouracil, be increased in the treatment of incurable cancer to find if it had more value than was generally believed".

"Dr. Ansfield found that 5-FU was effective against advanced colon cancer, a disease that defied other treatments. He performed clinical trials to develop protocols that maximized the therapeutic actions of 5-FU while minimizing the drug’s damage to normal tissues. These became the national standard for the use of 5-FU, which is still among the drugs in treatment mixtures for a variety of advanced cancer types."

By 1963, Dr. Ansfield had published a dosage regimen that provided safer application of 5-FU with less discomfort to patients.

"One of the important early discoveries at UW Hospitals was the discovery of the clinical usefulness of 5-FU by Drs. Heidelberger, Fred Ansfield, '33, and Anthony R. Curreri, '33" said Dr. Robert O. Johnson, acting director of the clinical oncology division, Wisconsin Clinical Cancer Center.

"Heidelberger’s work with Dr. Curreri, the Director of the Cancer Hospital, and Dr. Fred Ansfield demonstrated its clinical efficacy in cancer treatment and revolutionized the field of chemotherapy.

In Dr. Ansfield's book(s), he describes chemotherapeutic approaches in treating approximately 4000 cancer patients over a 15-year period.

On May 19, 1985, Dr. Ansfield received the Emeritus Faculty Award from the Wisconsin Medical Alumni Association for his pioneering chemotherapy work.

The American Society of Clinical Oncology's charitable organization, Conquer Cancer Foundation, granted a 'Fred J. Ansfield, MD Endowed Young Investigator Award' in 2017.

== Publications ==
Author or co-author of 125 professional publications including abstracts, articles, chapters and books including:

- Clinical Studies with 5-Fluorouracil, 1958
- Chemotherapy of Malignant Neoplasms, 1973
- Chemotherapy of Disseminated Solid Tumors, 1966
