= International Journal of Cancer =

- Discipline: Oncology
- Language: English
- Edited by: Christoph Plass

Publication details
- History: 1966–present
- Publisher: John Wiley & Sons on behalf of the Union for International Cancer Control
- Frequency: Biweekly
- Impact factor: 7.396 (2020)

Standard abbreviations
- ISO 4: Int. J. Cancer

Indexing
- CODEN: IJCNAW
- ISSN: 0020-7136 (print); 1097-0215 (web)
- LCCN: 66009863
- OCLC no.: 474772933

Links
- Journal homepage; Online access; Online archive

The International Journal of Cancer is a biweekly peer-reviewed medical journal covering experimental and clinical cancer research. It publishes original research articles, mini reviews, short reports, and letters to the editor. The journal was established in 1966 and is published by John Wiley & Sons on behalf of the Union for International Cancer Control. The editor-in-chief is Christoph Plass (Deutsches Krebsforschungszentrum). According to the Journal Citation Reports, the journal has a 2020 impact factor of 7.396.
