= Roman lead poisoning theory =

Hypothesis about the decline of the Roman Empire

Roman Empire

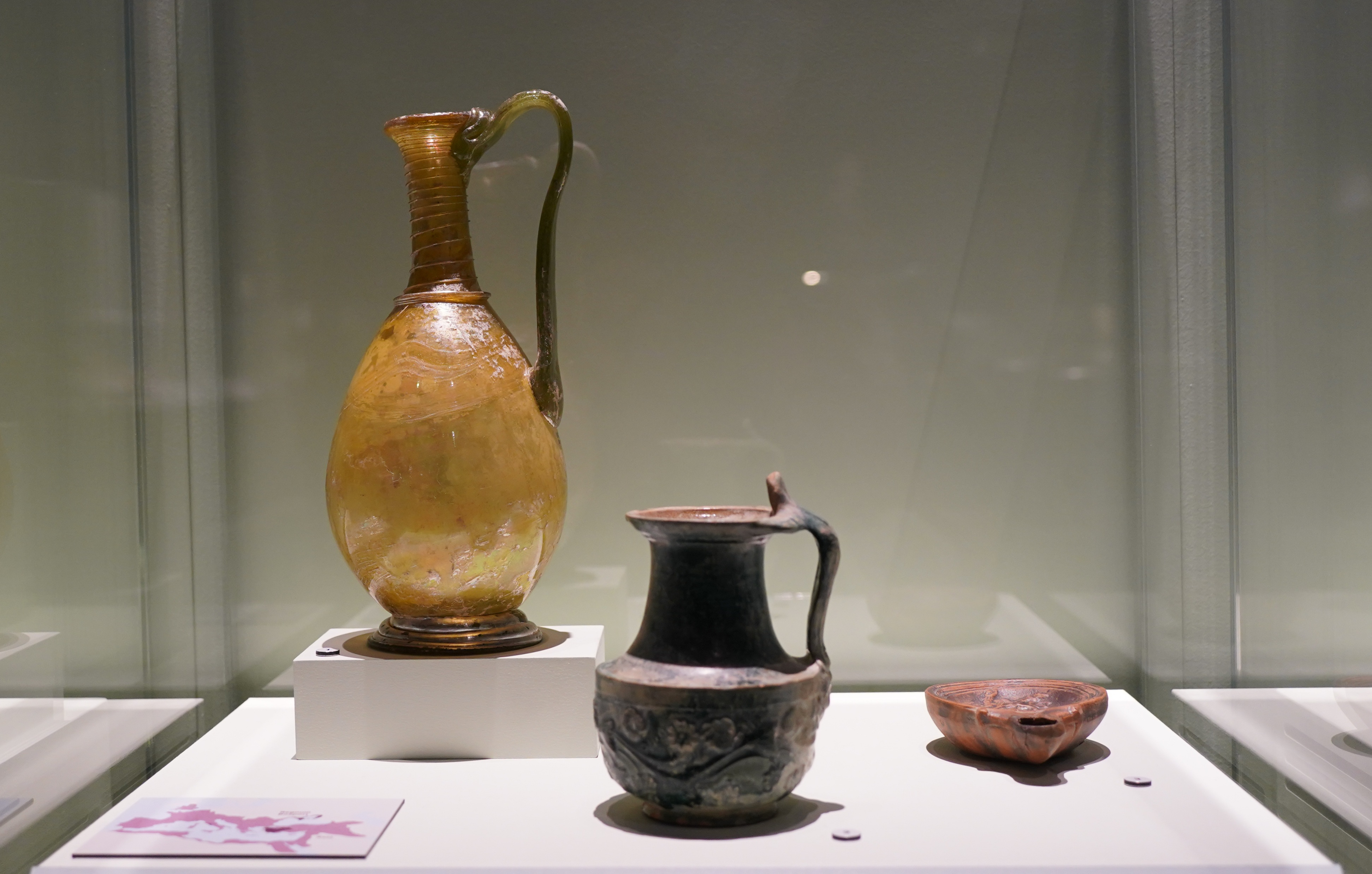
Roman wine jug

The Roman lead poisoning theory is the hypothesis that chronic lead exposure contributed to the decline of the Roman Empire. Some historians and scientists suggest that the widespread use of lead in water pipes (fistulae), cookware, and wine sweeteners (sapa) led to widespread lead poisoning, affecting public health, cognitive function, and decision-making among the Roman elite. However, the extent of lead's impact remains debated, with critics arguing that exposure levels were not high enough to cause significant harm.

== Background ==
The theory that lead poisoning contributed to the decline of the Roman Empire originated in the 19th century. Early proponents suggested that the Roman aristocracy's use of lead cookware and utensils led to chronic lead poisoning, resulting in health issues such as infertility and cognitive impairments. This hypothesis was based on observations of the widespread use of lead in Roman daily life, including in water pipes, cooking vessels, and as an additive in wine.

== 20th century ==
=== S. Colum Gilfillan ===
In the 20th century, researchers like S. C. Gilfillan expanded on this theory, proposing that lead poisoning caused lowered fertility, miscarriages, and abortions among Roman women, contributing to the decline of the Roman aristocracy. In his 1965 article "Lead Poisoning and the Fall of Rome", Gilfillan argued that the Roman aristocracy's use of lead cookware and lead-infused wine led to widespread lead poisoning, which he believed contributed to infertility and cognitive decline among the elite. He posited that this selective poisoning weakened the ruling class, thereby impacting the stability of the empire.

Studies of skeletal remains from the period revealed high concentrations of lead, providing physical evidence to support these claims.

=== Jerome Nriagu ===
Building upon Gilfillan's work, geochemist Jerome Nriagu published a study in 1983 titled "Saturnine Gout among Roman Aristocrats", in which he explored the prevalence of gout—a condition historically associated with lead poisoning—among the Roman elite. Nriagu suggested that the consumption of lead-contaminated food and beverages was a significant factor in the development of gout, further implicating lead poisoning in the health decline of Roman aristocracy.

== 21st century ==
=== Ice core analysis ===
Analyses of Arctic ice cores in the 2020s have provided compelling evidence linking atmospheric lead pollution during the Roman Empire to potential cognitive declines among its population. These ice cores, which preserve atmospheric particles from past millennia, serve as valuable records of historical pollution levels.

A study published in the Proceedings of the National Academy of Sciences examined ice cores spanning from 500 BCE to 600 CE, revealing significant increases in lead emissions starting around 15 BCE, coinciding with the rise of the Roman Empire. These elevated levels persisted until approximately 165 CE, aligning with the period known as the Pax Romana. The primary sources of this pollution were extensive mining and smelting operations, particularly for silver extraction, which released substantial amounts of lead into the atmosphere.

Utilizing atmospheric modeling, researchers estimated that during this peak period, average lead concentrations over Europe exceeded 1.0 ng/m^{3}, with areas near metallurgical activities experiencing concentrations surpassing 150 ng/m^{3}. These elevated atmospheric lead levels likely resulted in increased blood lead levels among the population, with children experiencing enhancements of about 2.4 μg/dL. Such exposure is associated with cognitive impairments, including an estimated reduction of 2.5 to 3 IQ points.

== See also ==
- Fall of the Western Roman Empire
- Medicine in ancient Rome
