= Cancer support group =

Cancer support groups are meetings that offer a safe space for people affected by cancer to share their experiences and emotions with other people who have cancer. People in stressful situations benefit from having a good social support system, and a cancer support group can be part of a support system.

Cancer support groups are similar to other kinds of other types of support groups. Different support systems have thus been developed including community support groups, online cancer support groups, networks, forums, and charitable organizations. Some groups focus on specific types of cancer and others include anyone. There are also support groups for family members and survivors.

== Types ==
Community support groups are usually led by psychologists, social workers, and medical professionals and can take place in churches, hospitals, or community centers.

Online support groups and forums are convenient for people who find it difficult to leave their homes. People participating in such forums have the possibility to maintain their anonymity.

Also, people may have different concerns stemming from their particular situation in life which may warrant a special support group that caters specifically to their needs. For example, there are support groups dedicated to helping younger women through their cancer experience, or that focus on parents with younger children.

Support for rare cancers is particularly challenging, as patients may be a long way from specialist treatment centers, and also from other patients with whom they might gain support and advice. The advent of the internet has allowed support groups for these rare cancers to emerge on a global basis, providing one to one and group oriented advice and support to patients and their families who may live on different continents, yet are able to share symptoms, experiences and advice, for example on diet or pain relief. Organizations such as European Organisation for Rare Diseases assist in coordinating and providing support for such organizations.

== Emotional and informational support ==
Cancer support groups can provide both emotional and informational support. However, many online cancer support groups skew towards providing more informational support. For example, cancer support groups may also share information regarding available treatments, managing side effects, or negotiating accommodations from a workplace.

Apart from having to cope with the physical and medical challenges, people with cancer face many worries, feelings, and concerns unique to their situation. Cancer patients may find that they need help coping with the emotional as well as the practical aspects of their disease. Attention to the emotional burden of having cancer is often a part of a patient's treatment plan. The support of the health care team (doctors, nurses, social workers), support groups, and patient-to-patient networks can help people feel less isolated and distressed, and improve the quality of their lives.

== No effect on cancer survival ==
Support groups provide many immediate and practical benefits to participants. However, participation in a support group does not cure cancer, slow the spread of cancer, or result in longer survival.

== See also ==
- Psycho-oncology
- Caregiver stress
- Cancer survivor
