= American Journal of Industrial Medicine =

- Discipline: Occupational safety and health
- Language: English
- Edited by: John Meyer

Publication details
- History: 1980–present
- Publisher: Wiley-Blackwell
- Frequency: Monthly
- Impact factor: 1.737 (2014)

Standard abbreviations
- ISO 4: Am. J. Ind. Med.

Indexing
- CODEN: AJIMD8
- ISSN: 0271-3586 (print); 1097-0274 (web)
- OCLC no.: 6624472

Links
- Journal homepage; Online access; Online archive

The American Journal of Industrial Medicine is a monthly peer-reviewed medical journal covering occupational safety and health, as well as environmental health. It was established in 1980 and is published by Wiley-Blackwell. The editor-in-chief is John Meyer, formerly Steven B. Markowitz (Queens College, City University of New York). According to the Journal Citation Reports, the journal has a 2014 impact factor of 1.737.
