= Neuro-Oncology (journal) =

- Discipline: Neuro-oncology
- Language: English
- Edited by: Susan M. Chang

Publication details
- History: 1999-present
- Publisher: Oxford University Press
- Frequency: Monthly
- Impact factor: 16.4 (2023)

Standard abbreviations
- ISO 4: Neuro-Oncol.
- NLM: Neuro Oncol

Indexing
- CODEN: NEURJR
- ISSN: 1522-8517 (print); 1523-5866 (web)
- LCCN: sn98001441
- OCLC no.: 40529271

Links
- Journal homepage; Online access; Online archive

Neuro-Oncology is a monthly peer-reviewed medical journal covering cancer of the nervous system. It was established in 1999 and is published by Oxford University Press on behalf of the Society for Neuro-Oncology. The editor-in-chief is Susan M. Chang. According to the Journal Citation Reports, the journal has a 2019 impact factor of 10.091.
