= Support group =

Gathering of people discussing a shared burden

A support group is an organisation wherein members provide each other with various types of help, usually nonprofessional and nonmaterial, for a particular shared, usually burdensome, characteristic. Members with the same issues can come together for sharing coping strategies, to feel more empowered and for a sense of community. The help may take the form of providing and evaluating relevant information, relating personal experiences, listening to and accepting others' experiences, providing sympathetic understanding and establishing social networks. A support group may also work to inform the public or engage in advocacy.

== History ==
Formal support groups may appear to be a modern phenomenon, but they supplement traditional fraternal organizations such as Freemasonry in some respects, and may build on certain supportive functions (formerly) carried out in (extended) families.

Other types of groups formed to support causes, including causes outside of themselves, are more often called advocacy groups, interest groups, lobby groups, pressure groups or promotional groups. Trade unions and many environmental groups, for example, are interest groups. The term support group in this article refers to peer-to-peer support.

== Maintaining contact ==
Support groups maintain interpersonal contact among their members in a variety of ways. Traditionally, groups meet in person in sizes that allow conversational interaction. Support groups also maintain contact through printed newsletters, telephone chains, internet forums, and mailing lists. Some support groups are exclusively online (see below).

Membership in some support groups is formally controlled, with admission requirements and membership fees. Other groups are "open" and allow anyone to attend an advertised meeting, for example, or to participate in an online forum.

== Management by peers or professionals ==
A self-help support group is fully organized and managed by its members, who are commonly volunteers and have personal experience in the subject of the group's focus. These groups may also be referred to as fellowships, peer support groups, lay organizations, mutual help groups, or mutual aid self-help groups. Most common are 12-step groups such as Alcoholics Anonymous and self-help groups for mental health.

Professionally operated support groups are facilitated by professionals who most often do not share the problem of the members, such as social workers, psychologists, or members of the clergy. The facilitator controls discussions and provides other managerial services. Such professionally operated groups are often found in institutional settings, including hospitals, drug-treatment centers and correctional facilities. These types of support groups may run for a specified period of time, and an attendance fee is sometimes charged.

== Types ==
In the case of a disease, an identity or a pre-disposition, for example, a support group will provide information, act as a clearing-house for experiences, and may serve as a public relations voice for affected people, other members, and their families.

For more temporary concerns, such as bereavement or episodic medical conditions, a support group may veer more towards helping those involved to overcome or push through their condition/experience.

Some support groups and conditions for which such groups may be formed are:

- Addiction
- AIDS
- Alzheimer's
- Alcoholics Anonymous
- Anxiety disorders
- Asperger syndrome
- Borderline personality disorder
- Breastfeeding
- Brain attack or Brain trauma
- Cancer
- Circadian rhythm disorders, e.g. DSPD, Non-24
- Codependency
- Diabetes
- Debtors Anonymous
- Domestic violence
- Eating disorders
- Erythema nodosum
- Families of addicts & alcoholics
- Fibromyalgia
- Gamblers Anonymous
- Grief
- Infertility
- Inflammatory bowel disease
- Irritable bowel syndrome
- Mental health
- Miscarriage
- Mood disorders
- Narcolepsy
- Parkinson's disease
- Red Skin Syndrome/Topical Steroid Addiction and Withdrawal
- Sexual abuse survivors
- Sleep disorders
- Stuttering
- Suicide prevention
- Ulcerative colitis

== Online support groups ==
Since at least 1982, the Internet has provided a venue for support groups. Discussing online self-help support groups as the precursor to e-therapy, Martha Ainsworth notes that "the enduring success of these groups has firmly established the potential of computer-mediated communication to enable discussion of sensitive personal issues."

In one study of the effectiveness of online support groups among patients with head and neck cancer, longer participation in online support groups were found to result in a better health-related quality of life. A 2026 review found that online support groups in cancer can produce beneficial outcomes in distress, isolation, empowerment, and self-esteem, but there is a range of factors that influence whether an individual uses or benefits from an online support group.

Gerald Ganglbauer's Parkins(on)line

=== Appropriate groups still difficult to find ===
A researcher from University College London says the lack of qualitative directories, and the fact that many support groups are not listed by search engines can make finding an appropriate group difficult. Even so, he does say that the medical community needs "to understand the use of personal experiences rather than an evidence-based approach... these groups also impact on how individuals use information. They can help people learn how to find and use information: for example, users swap Web sites and discuss Web sites."

It is not difficult to find an online support group, but it is hard to find a good one. In the article What to Look for in Quality Online Support Groups, John M. Grohol gives tips for evaluating online groups and states: "In good online support groups, members stick around long after they've received the support they were seeking. They stay because they want to give others what they themselves found in the group. Psychologists call this high group cohesion, and it is the pinnacle of group achievement."

=== Benefits and pitfalls ===
Several studies have shown the importance of the Internet in providing social support, particularly to groups with chronic health problems. Especially in cases of uncommon ailments, a sense of community and understanding in spite of great geographical distances can be important, in addition to sharing of knowledge.

Online support groups, online communities for those affected by a common problem, give mutual support and provide information, two often inseparable features. They are, according to Henry Potts of University College London, "an overlooked resource for patients." Many studies have looked at the content of messages, while what matters is the effect that participation in the group has on the individual. Potts complains that research on these groups has lagged behind, particularly on the groups which are set up by the people with the problems, rather than by researchers and healthcare professionals. User-defined groups can share the sort of practical knowledge that healthcare professionals can overlook, and they also impact on how individuals find, interpret and use information.

There are many benefits to online support groups that have been found through research studies. Although online support group users are not required to be anonymous, a study conducted by Baym (2010) finds that anonymity is beneficial to those who are lonely or anxious. This does not pertain to some people seeking support groups, because not all are lonely and/or anxious, but for those who are, online support groups are a great outlet where one can feel comfortable honestly expressing themselves because the other users do not know who they are.

A study was conducted by Walther and Boyd (2000) and they found a common trend to why people find online support groups appealing. First, the social distance between members online reduced embarrassment and they appreciated the greater range of expertise offered in the larger online social network. Next, they found that anonymity increased one's confidence in providing support to others and decreased embarrassment. The users of the social support websites were more comfortable being able to reread and edit their comments and discussion forum entries before sending them, and they have access to the website any time during the day. Each of these characteristics of online support groups are not offered when going to an in-person support group.

In a study conducted by Gunther Eysenbach, John Powell, Marina Englesakis, Carlos Rizo, and Anita Stern (2004), the researchers found it difficult to draw conclusions on the effectiveness of online peer-to-peer support groups. In online support groups, people must have the desire to support and help each other, and many times participants go on the sites in order to get help themselves or are limited to a certain subgroup.

An additional benefit to online support groups is that participation is asynchronous. This means that it is not necessary for all participants to be logged into the forum simultaneously in order to communicate. An experience or question can be posted and others can answer questions or comment on posts whenever they are logged in and have an appropriate response. This characteristic allows for participation and mass communication without having to worry about time constraints. Additionally, there are 24-hour chat rooms and spaces for focused conversation at all times of the day or night. This allows users to get the support they need whenever they need it, while remaining comfortable and, if they so wish, anonymous.

=== Mental health ===
Although there has been relatively little research on the effectiveness of online support groups in mental health, there is some evidence that online support groups can be beneficial. Large randomised controlled trials have both found positive effects and failed to find positive effects.

== See also ==
- Peer support
- Group psychotherapy
- Self-help groups for mental health
- List of Twelve-Step groups
- Category:Online support groups
