= Douglas Blayney =

American academic

Douglas Blayney is an oncologist in the United States who has been involved with several clinical oncological organizations within the United States. He is internationally recognized for his expertise in oncology quality and informatics and hematological malignancy. He has currently been elected to become president of the American Society for Clinical Oncology, worked at the University of Michigan as the medical director of the university's cancer center, and is a former medical director at Stanford Cancer Institute. He specializes in hematology and oncology, but his research specializes in breast cancer, lymphoma, and the use of electronic technology to enhance medical practice.

== Early life ==
Douglas Blayney was born in Fowler, California a small, rural farming community in the Central Valley of California and raised in nearby Fresno.

== Education ==
Douglas Blayney attended Stanford University from 1968 to 1972, where he received his Bachelor of Science in Electrical Engineering. He went on to earn his M.D. at the University of California at San Diego School of Medicine in 1977.

After receiving his M.D., Blayney completed his residency at the University of California at San Diego from 1977 to 1980. After graduating in 1980, Blayney became certified to practice internal medicine, while in 1983 he received his certification in medical oncology where he also completed his fellowship in oncology at the National Cancer Institute in Bethesda, Maryland.

== Professional career ==
Blayney worked as a medical oncologist and hematologist for the private practice the Wilshire Oncology Medical Group, Inc, in Pasadena, California. Blayney worked at Wilshire Oncology for 17 years, from 1986 to 2003.

Blayney’s experience was extended to medical director of the University of Michigan’s Comprehensive Cancer Center in July 2003, and returned to Stanford University to become the Ann and John Doerr Medical Center Director from 2010 to 2015.
