= SCIB1 =

SCIB1 is a genetically-engineered cancer vaccine being developed by Scancell Holdings Plc as a treatment for melanoma. SCIB1 is a plasmid DNA which encodes a human antibody molecule engineered to express two cytotoxic T cell epitopes derived from the melanoma antigens Tyrosinase-Related Protein 2 (TRP2) and gp100 plus two helper T cell epitopes.

== Description ==
Scancell's first cancer vaccine, SCIB1, is being developed for the treatment of melanoma and is in Phase I/II clinical trials. Following immunisation, the engineered antibody is expressed and taken up by dendritic cells, resulting in the development of immune responses against tumour cells expressing the TRP2 and gp100 antigens. The major advantage of the Immunobody® technology is that the Fc component of the engineered antibody will be recognised by the high affinity CD64 receptor present on dendritic cells, leading to a significant enhancement of both the frequency and avidity of the T cell immune response. The induction of high avidity T cells against TRP-2 and gp100 destroys both primary and metastatic tumours, leading to longer progression free survival.

Phase I/II clinical trial of SCIB1 Scancell is conducting a Phase I/II clinical trial of SCIB1, its DNA ImmunoBody® vaccine being developed for the treatment of melanoma. The trial is being carried out at clinical sites in Nottingham, Manchester, Guildford, Leeds and Southampton. The trial is an open label, non-randomised study to determine the safety and tolerability of four doses of SCIB1 administered intramuscularly using an electroporation device (TDS-IM, manufactured by Ichor Medical Systems, USA). The study will also assess immune effects and anti-tumour activity in patients with melanoma. The trial is being conducted in patients with both unresected and resected disease.

Patients with Stage III or Stage IV melanoma received up to five doses of the SCIB1 vaccine over a 6-month period. In addition, some patients are being given long term treatment every 3–6 months for up to 5 years. The results to date have been highly encouraging. All 20 patients with resected tumours are still alive, and only five have progressed. This compares very favourably with data from historical controls.
