= Journal of Clinical Oncology =

Academic journal

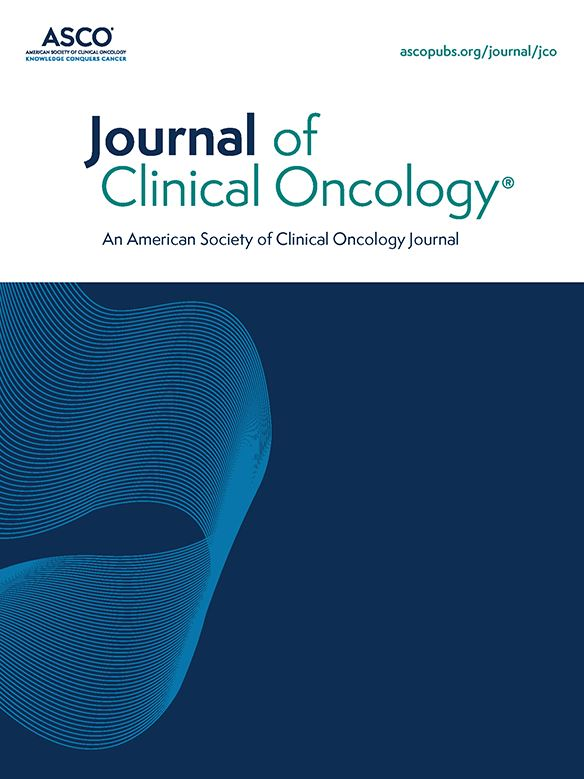
- Discipline: Oncology
- Language: English

Publication details
- History: 1983–present
- Publisher: ASCO Publications (United States)
- Frequency: 36/year
- Open access: Delayed, after 1 year
- Impact factor: 42.1 (2023)

Standard abbreviations
- ISO 4: J. Clin. Oncol.

Indexing
- CODEN: JCONDN
- ISSN: 0732-183X (print); 1527-7755 (web)
- OCLC no.: 231030003

Links
- Journal homepage; Online access; Online archive

The Journal of Clinical Oncology is a peer-reviewed medical journal published 3 times a month by ASCO Publications. It covers research on all aspects of clinical oncology. The journal was established in 1983 and the editor-in-chief is Jonathan W. Friedberg (University of Rochester).

== History ==
In 1981 Emil Frei III proposed that the American Society of Clinical Oncology should publish an official journal. The first issue was published on January 1, 1983, containing 70 pages of research and an editorial by the then editor-in-chief, Joseph Bertino. Bertino was succeeded by George P. Canellos in 1987. In 1998, a Spanish language edition of the journal started quarterly publication, followed by a Chinese language edition. Currently there are 10 international editions. Daniel Haller became editor-in-chief in 2001 and during his tenure the journal moved from its publisher Grune & Stratton to in-house publication by society staff. Stephen A. Cannistra was editor-in-chief from 2011 to 2021.

== Abstracting and indexing ==
The journal is abstracted and indexed in:

- Chemical Abstracts Service
- CINAHL
- Current Contents/Clinical Medicine
- Current Contents/Life Sciences
- EBSCO databases
- Embase
- Index medicus/MEDLINE/PubMed
- Science Citation Index Expanded
- Scopus

According to the Journal Citation Reports, the journal has a 2023 impact factor of 42.1, ranking it 6th out of 322 journals in the category "Oncology".

== See also ==
- JCO Clinical Cancer Informatics
- Journal of Oncology Practice
- JCO Global Oncology
