= American Society of Clinical Oncology =

Professional organization

- Formation: 1964
- Headquarters: Alexandria, Virginia
- Members: Nearly 45,000
- Official language: English
- President: Lori J. Pierce
- Website: asco.org

The American Society of Clinical Oncology (ASCO) is a professional organization representing physicians of all oncology sub-specialties who care for people with cancer. Founded in 1964 by Fred Ansfield, Harry Bisel, Herman Freckman, Arnoldus Goudsmit, Robert Talley, William Wilson, and Jane C. Wright, it has nearly 45,000 members worldwide.

== Physician education ==
ASCO offers educational resources for cancer physicians and other health care professionals of clinical oncology. These include scientific meetings, educational conferences, professional workshops, and special symposia on issues of particular relevance and importance to oncologists and researchers. It also produced the patient information website, Cancer.Net.

It publishes numerous journals, books, newsletters, and online and multimedia resources; it publishes the Journal of Clinical Oncology (JCO), the JCO Oncology Practice (JCO OP), and the JCO Global Oncology (JCO GO), JCO Clinical Cancer Informatics, which publishes clinically relevant research based on biomedical informatics methods and processes applied to cancer-related data, information, and images, and JCO Precision Oncology, which publishes original research, reports, opinions, and reviews related to precision oncology and genomics-driven care of patients with cancer.

ASCO also publishes special curricula to address the specific educational needs of cancer professionals.

== Publications ==
- Journal of Clinical Oncology
- JCO Oncology Practice
- JCO Global Oncology
- JCO Clinical Cancer Informatics
- JCO Precision Oncology
- ASCO Connection
- "The ASCO Post"

== Initiatives ==
Created by members of ASCO, the Conquer Cancer Foundation of ASCO is a 501(c)(3) charitable organization. Since the inception of its grants and awards program in 1984, Conquer Cancer has awarded more than $215 million in funding through nearly 10,500 grants and awards to researchers in 102 countries. In 2015, the foundation launched The Campaign to Conquer Cancer, a comprehensive campaign to raise $150 million to fund cancer research, support Conquer Cancer's top priorities, and bring national awareness to the Foundation.

The ASCO post also reviews books and journals written by notable authors in medicine and other domains. ASCO reviewed the Second Edition of Advanced Healthcare Through Personalized Medicine in 2022 authored by Priya Hays, which was described as the “depth of technical information and wellspring of novel advances carefully woven into a personalized medicine matrix are admirable” and “a top-notch operation from cover to cover”.

ASCO's patient information website, Cancer.NET, is supported by the Conquer Cancer Foundation of ASCO. Cancer LINQ is ASCO's data platform initiative. It was created to give oncologists a robust quality monitoring system that collects and analyzes data from all patient encounters to improve quality of care. ASCO published its Value Framework in 2015 and updated it in 2016. This provides physicians and patients with a tool to assess and compare the value of different drugs in an era of skyrocking anticancer drug costs.

== Notable fellows ==
- Rachna Shroff (died 2026)

== See also ==
- American Cancer Society
- American Association for Cancer Research
- American Radium Society
