= JCO Clinical Cancer Informatics =

- Discipline: Oncology, medical informatics
- Language: English
- Edited by: Jeremy L. Warner

Publication details
- History: 2017–present
- Publisher: Lippincott Williams & Wilkins
- Frequency: Upon acceptance
- Open access: Hybrid, delayed, after 12 months
- Impact factor: 3.3 (2023)

Standard abbreviations
- ISO 4: JCO Clin. Cancer Inform.

Indexing
- ISSN: 2473-4276
- LCCN: 2016202993

Links
- Journal homepage

JCO Clinical Cancer Informatics is an online peer-reviewed medical journal of oncology and medical informatics published by Lippincott Williams & Wilkins. The journal was established in 2017 and the editor-in-chief is Jeremy L. Warner (Brown University). Articles are published upon acceptance and after 12 months become freely available. All ASCO special articles (e.g. clinical guidelines and policy statements), editorials, comments and controversies articles, and correspondence are freely available immediately upon publication.

== Abstracting and indexing ==
This journal is abstracted and indexed in:

- Emerging Sources Citation Index
- Index Medicus/MEDLINE/PubMed
- Scopus

== See also ==
- Journal of Clinical Oncology
- Journal of Oncology Practice
- JCO Global Oncology
