= Sara C. Bisel =

American archaeologist and anthropologist (1932–1996)

- Born: Sara Louise Clark; 13 May 1932; Johnstown, Pennsylvania
- Died: 4 February 1996 (aged 63)
- Occupation(s): Physical anthropologist Classical archaeologist
- Spouse: Harry Bisel
- Children: Jane F. Bisel; Clark C. Bisel; Harold I. Bisel

Dr. Sara C. Bisel (1932–1996) was a physical anthropologist and classical archaeologist who played a prominent role in early scientific research at Herculaneum, a Mediterranean coastal town destroyed by the 79 AD eruption of Mount Vesuvius. Her pioneering work in the chemical and physical analysis of skeletons yielded new insights into the nutrition and health of ancient populations. This was considered ground-breaking and helped advance the field of paleodemography.

== Life and work ==
Born Sara Louise Clark on May 13, 1932, in Johnstown, Pennsylvania, Bisel grew up in western Pennsylvania. She graduated from Carnegie-Mellon University in Pittsburgh with a bachelor's degree in nutrition and biochemistry. She married Harry Bisel, a Mayo Clinic medical oncologist, and lived in Rochester, Minnesota from 1963.

At the University of Minnesota, she earned a master's degree in classical area studies, with a specialization in Greek archaeology, and a Ph.D. in physical anthropology. She was awarded a fellowship by the Smithsonian Institution in 1977 and conducted independent research funded by the Smithsonian Institution and the National Geographic Society from 1981 to 1988. She was a visiting scientist at the Mayo Clinic, and a research associate and Fellow at the Smithsonian Institution.

The author of numerous articles published in scholarly and professional journals, she taught at the University of Minnesota, the University of Maryland, and the American School of Classical Studies in Athens, Greece. She worked on various sites throughout Greece, Turkey, Israel and Italy.

Her work at Herculaneum established her international reputation as an authority on ancient health and nutrition. She is considered a "pioneer" in the use of chemical analysis to study health in ancient populations. In 1982 she was sent to Herculaneum by the National Geographic Society to assist with the excavation, preservation and analysis of human remains recovered from the town's ancient beach front. Giuseppe Maggi, the director of the excavations, asked for international assistance in preserving the skeletons which, buried in wet volcanic soil, were degrading once exposed to air. Over 5 weeks she excavated 26 skeletons.

Sara Bisel died on 4 February 1996.

== Professional societies ==
- American Association of Physical Anthropologists
- Paleopathology Association
- Society for Ancient Medicine and Pharmacy
- American Association for the Advancement of Science
- Society of Woman Geographers
- National Geographic Explorer's Club

== Awards ==
- Outstanding Woman of Science, 1988. National Geographic Explorer's
