= Epithelial dysplasia =

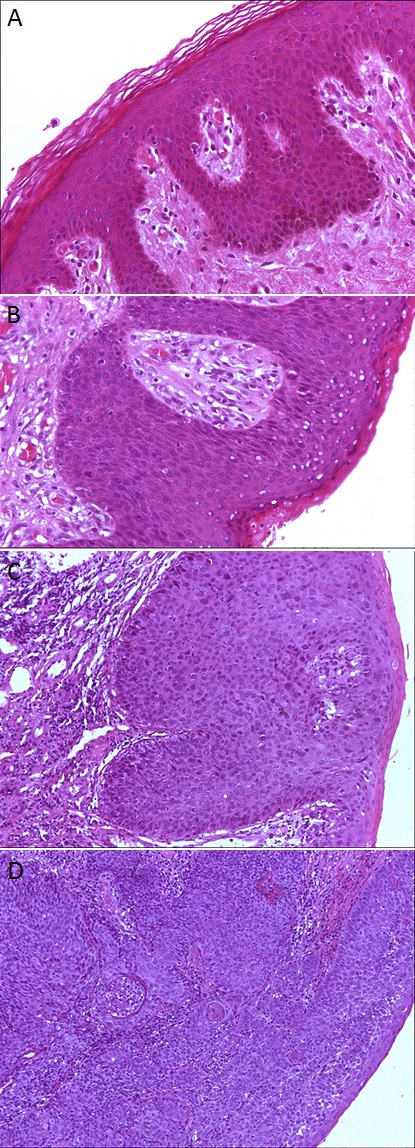
Histopathology of anal epithelium: A. Normal histology, negative for anal intraepithelial neoplasia lesion (AIN) B. Low-grade dysplasia, here called low-grade squamous intraepithelial lesion (LSIL) C. High-grade dysplasia, here called high grade squamous intraepithelial lesion (HSIL) D. Squamous cell carcinoma, infiltrating the stroma (middle and left in image), and HSIL (right in image)

Epithelial dysplasia, a term becoming increasingly referred to as intraepithelial neoplasia, is the sum of various disturbances of epithelial proliferation and differentiation as seen microscopically. Individual cellular features of dysplasia are called epithelial atypia.

Examples of epithelial dysplasia include cervical intraepithelial neoplasia – a disorder commonly detected by an abnormal pap smear) consisting of an increased population of immature (basal-like) cells which are restricted to the mucosal surface, and have not invaded through the basement membrane to the deeper soft tissues. Analogous conditions include vaginal intraepithelial neoplasia and vulvar intraepithelial neoplasia. Metanephric dysplastic hematoma of the sacral region is a dysplastic overgrowth observed in infants.

== Screening ==
Some tests which detect cancer could be called "screening for epithelial dysplasia". The principle behind these tests is that physicians expect dysplasia to occur at the same rate in a typical individual as it would in many other people. Because of this, researchers design screening recommendations which assume that if a physician can find no dysplasia at certain time, then doing testing before waiting until new dysplasia could potentially develop would be a waste of medical resources for the patient and the healthcare provider because the chances of detecting anything is extremely low.

Some examples of this in practice are that if a patient whose endoscopy did not detect dysplasia on biopsy during screening for Barrett's esophagus, then research shows that there is little chance of any test detecting dysplasia for that patient within three years.

Individuals at average-risk for colorectal cancer should have another screening after ten years if they get a normal result and after five years if they have only one or two adenomatous polyps removed.

== Microscopic changes ==
Dysplasia is characterised by four major pathological microscopic changes:

1. Anisocytosis (cells of unequal size)
2. Poikilocytosis (abnormally shaped cells)
3. Hyperchromatism (excessive pigmentation)
4. Presence of mitotic figures (an unusual number of cells which are currently dividing).

Other changes that occur in epithelial dysplasia include:

- Drop-shaped rete processes
- Basal cell hyperplasia
- Irregular epithelial stratification
- Increased nuclear-cytoplasmic ratio
- Increased normal and abnormal mitosis
- Enlarged nucleoli
- Individual cell keratinization
- Loss or reduction of cellular cohesion
- Cellular pleomorphism
- Loss of basal cell polarity
- Koilocytosis

Epithelial cell dysplasia is divided into three categories of severity: mild, moderate, and severe. Epithelial dysplasia becomes microinvasive squamous cell carcinoma once the tumor begins to invade nearby tissue.

== Dysplasia vs. carcinoma in situ vs. invasive carcinoma ==
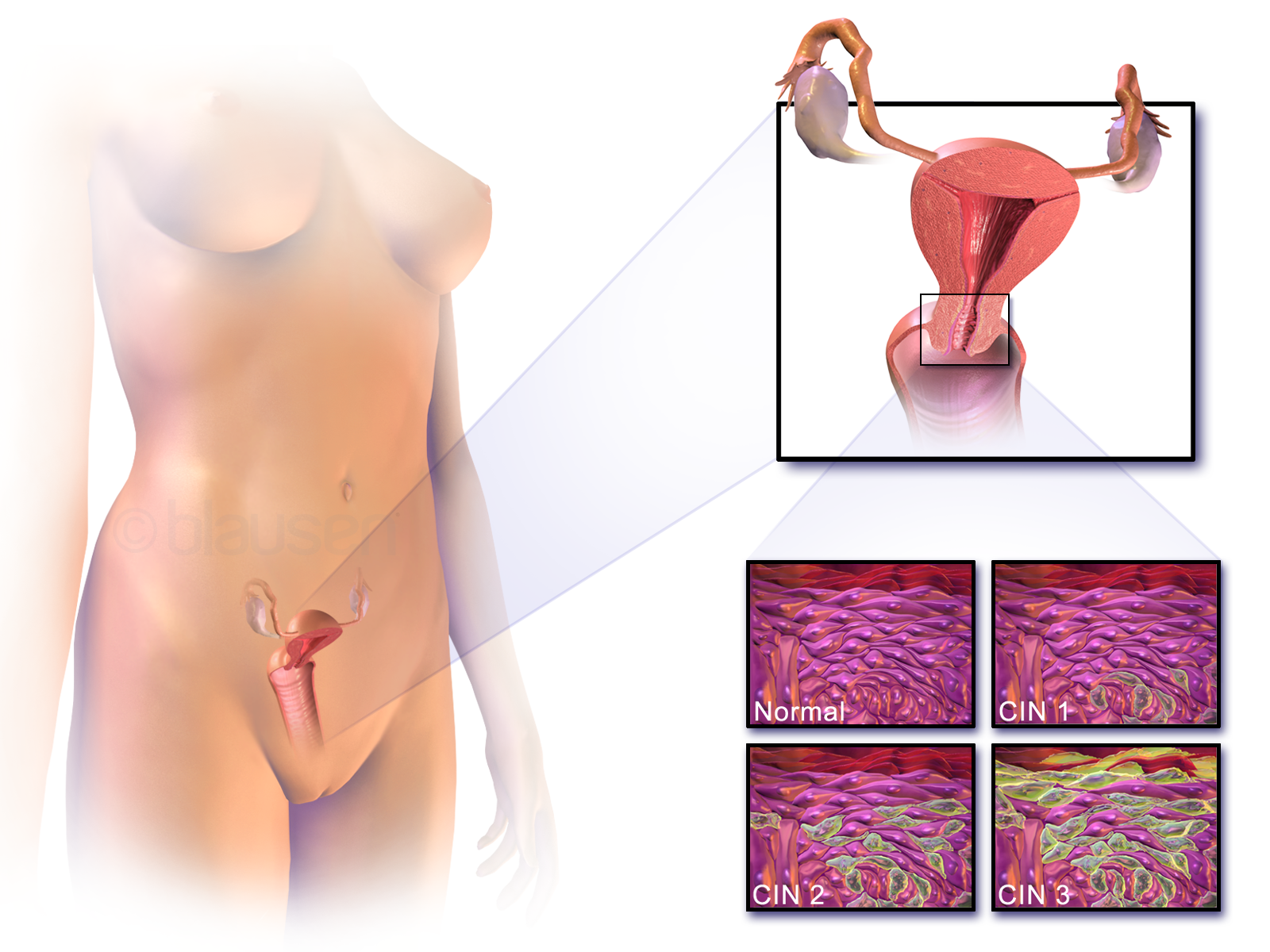
Cervical dysplasia illustrations showing CIN pathology

These terms are related since they represent three stages in the progression of many malignant tumors of the epithelium. The likelihood of the development to cancer is related to the degree of dysplasia.

- Dysplasia is the earliest form of precancerous lesion which pathologists can recognize in a pap smear or in a biopsy. Dysplasia can be low grade or high grade. The risk of low-grade dysplasia transforming into high-grade dysplasia, and eventually cancer, is low. Treatment is usually straightforward. High-grade dysplasia represents a more advanced progression towards malignant transformation.
- Carcinoma in situ, meaning "cancer in place", represents the transformation of a neoplastic lesion to one in which cells undergo essentially no maturation, thus may be considered cancer-like. In this state, epithelial cells have lost their tissue identity and have reverted to a primitive cell form that grows rapidly and with abnormal regulation for the tissue type. However, this form of cancer remains localized, and has not invaded past the basement membrane into tissues below the surface.
- Invasive carcinoma is the final step in this sequence. It is a cancer which has invaded beyond the basement membrane and has potential to spread to other parts of the body. Invasive carcinoma can usually be treated, but not always successfully. However, if it is left untreated, it is almost always fatal.

== See also ==
- Dysplasia
