= Koilocyte =

Type of cell that has been changed by HPV

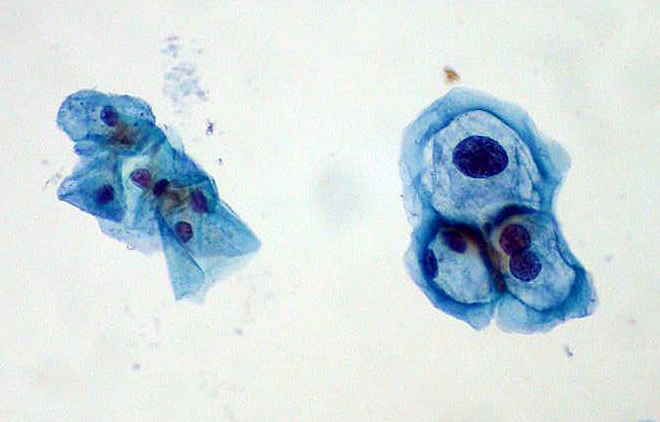
ThinPrep pap smear with group of normal cervical cells on left and HPV-infected cells showing features typical of koilocytes: enlarged (x2 or x3) nuclei and hyperchromasia.

A koilocyte is a squamous epithelial cell that has undergone a number of structural changes, which occur as a result of infection of the cell by human papillomavirus (HPV). Identification of these cells by pathologists can be useful in diagnosing various HPV-associated lesions.

== History ==
With the advent of the PAP smear in 1941 for the diagnosis of cervical lesions, numerous cytological observations were made over a short period of time. In 1951, the Canadian gynaecologist/cytologist James Ernest Ayre described and illustrated halo cells while working in Miami. He described these squamous cells of the uterine cervix to be having a perinuclear clearing, mono or bi-nucleate with poor keratinizing features and hyperchromatic atypical nuclei. He also proposed that these vacuolated cells were pre-cancerous and being always found in association with chronic inflammatory cells, must be caused by a long standing inflammation of infection either viral or otherwise. He said that the presence of these vacuoles denoted a degenerative change of the cell.

In a letter of correspondence to the Wiley online library celebrating the 57th birthday of koilocytes, Leopold G. Koss recounts on how he and his associate technician Grace Durfee came across these cells. In 1955 George Papanicolaou, a three times visitor to their laboratory noticed the cells in cervical smears and labelled them 'dyskaryotic', but failed to realise the potential of their unusual appearance. Koss and Durfee, fascinated by these cells, further described them in a series of lectures on cytopathology in Europe in the year 1955.

As he studied the cells the feature that struck him the most was their hollow appearance and he related this largely to a term used to describe hollow nails- Koilonychias and hence the name Koilocytosis. In 1956 they published their findings in a study titled “Unusual patterns of squamous epithelium of the uterine cervix: cytological and pathologic study of Koilocytic atypia” where koilocytes were described as- 'large epithelial cells with relatively small but irregularly shaped hyperchromatic nuclei surrounded by glycogen negative clear halos'. Subsequently zur Hansen associated koilocytes to the Human Papilloma virus in his article “Human papillomaviruses and their possible role in squamous cell carcinomas” in the year 1977 for which he received the Nobel Prize in 2008.

== Koilocytosis ==
Koilocytosis or koilocytic atypia or koilocytotic atypia are terms used in histology and cytology to describe the presence of koilocytes in a specimen.

Koilocytes may have the following cellular changes:

- Nuclear enlargement (two to three times normal size).
- Irregularity of the nuclear membrane contour, creating a wrinkled or raisinoid appearance.
- A darker than normal staining pattern in the nucleus, known as hyperchromasia.
- A clear area around the nucleus, known as a perinuclear halo or perinuclear cytoplasmic vacuolization.
- Accompanied by dyskeratotic cells and cells rich in keratohyaline granules.

Collectively, these types of changes are called a cytopathic effect; various types of cytopathic effect can be seen in many different cell types infected by many different viruses. Infection of cells with HPV causes the specific cytopathic effects seen in koilocytes.

== Pathogenesis ==
The atypical features seen in cells displaying koilocytosis result from the action of the E5 and E6 oncoproteins produced by HPV. These proteins break down keratin in HPV-infected cells, resulting in the perinuclear halo and nuclear enlargement typical of koilocytes. The E6 oncoprotein, along with E7, is also responsible for the dysregulation of the cell cycle that results in squamous cell dysplasia. The E6 and E7 oncoproteins do this by binding and inhibiting the tumor suppressor genes p53 and RB, respectively. This promotes progression of cells through the cell cycle without appropriate repair of DNA damage, resulting in dysplasia. Due to the ability of HPV to cause cellular dysplasia, koilocytes are found in a number of potentially precancerous lesions.

== Visualization of koilocytes ==
Koilocytes can be visualized microscopically when tissue is collected, fixed, and stained. Though koilocytes can be found in lesions in a number of locations, cervical cytology samples, commonly known as Pap smears, frequently contain koilocytes. In order to visualize koilocytes collected from the cervix, the tissue is stained with the Papanicolaou stain. Another way koilocytes can be visualized is by fixation of tissue with formalin and staining with hematoxylin and eosin, commonly known as H&E. These stains give the cytoplasm and nuclei of cells characteristic colors and allows for visualization of the nuclear enlargement and irregularity, hyperchromasia, and perinuclear halo that are typical of koilocytes.

== Lesions containing koilocytes ==
Koilocytes may be found in potentially precancerous cervical, oral and anal lesions.

=== Cervical lesions ===
==== Atypical squamous cells of undetermined significance (ASC-US) ====
When examining cytologic specimens, a diagnosis of ASC-US is given if squamous cells are suspicious for low-grade squamous intraepithelial lesion (LSIL) but do not fulfill the criteria. This may be due to limitations in the quality of the specimen, or because the abnormalities in the cells are milder than that seen in LSIL. Cells in this category display koilocyte-like changes such as vacuolization, but not enough changes to definitively diagnose as LSIL. A diagnosis of ASC-US warrants further follow-up to better characterize the extent of the abnormal cells.

==== Low-grade squamous intraepithelial lesion (LSIL) ====
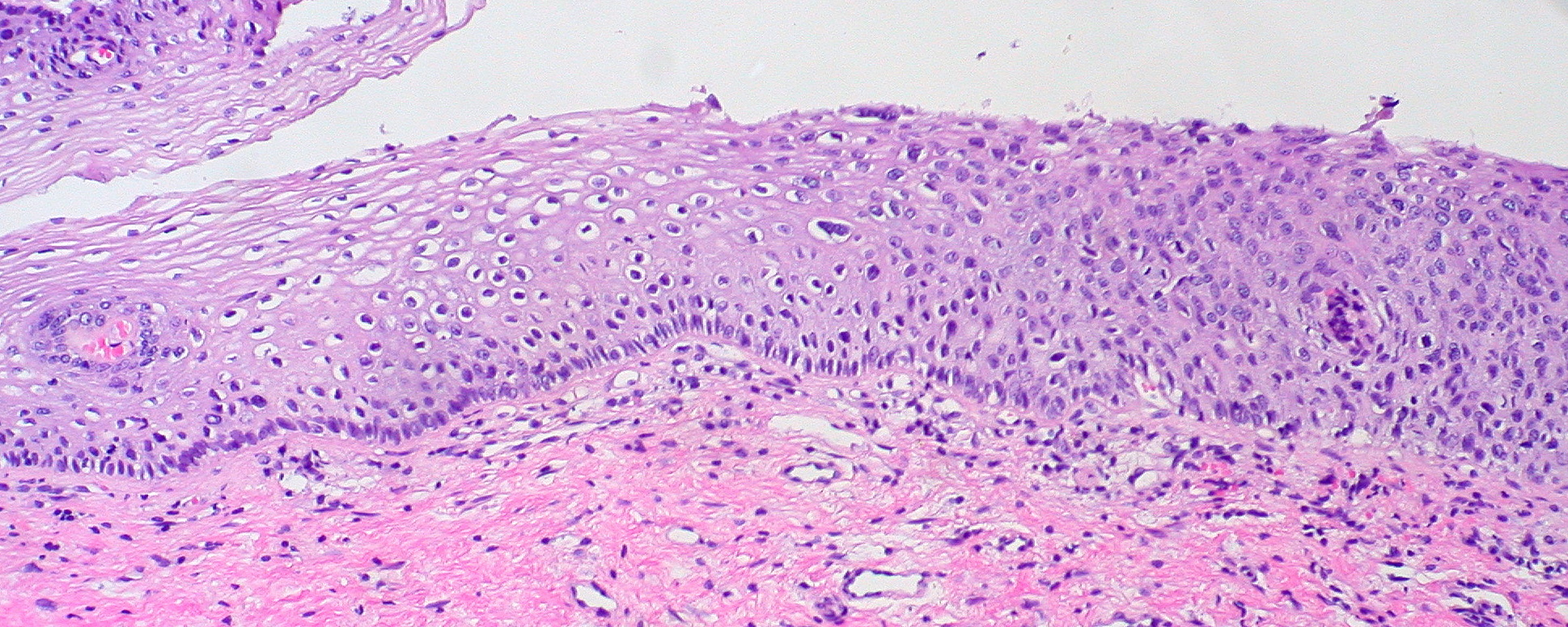
LEEP cone biopsy displaying normal cervical epithelium (far left) progressing to borderline koilocytosis, to LSIL, and to HSIL (far right).

In LSIL of the cervix, definitive koilocytes are present. In addition, squamous cells commonly display binucleation and mitoses are present, signifying increased cellular division. However, these changes are primarily limited to upper cell layers in the epithelium, no mitoses are found higher than the lower one third of epithelium, and the basal layer of cells remains a discrete layer. This differentiates this lesion from high-grade squamous intraepithelial lesion (HSIL) of the cervix.

=== Oral lesions ===
==== Verruca vulgaris ====
Verruca vulgaris, or common warts, may arise in the oral mucosa. These lesions are associated with HPV subtypes 1, 6, 11, and 57. Histopathology of these lesions displays koilocytes in the epithelium.

==== Oropharyngeal cancer ====
Approximately 50 percent of oropharyngeal cancers are associated with HPV infection. Koilocytosis is the most common cytopathic effect present in HPV-related oropharyngeal cancers. However, the current standard of care for these tumors includes verification of HPV status using methodologies other than the histopathologic presence or absence of koilocytes alone. These methodologies include polymerase chain reaction (PCR), in situ hybridization (ISH), and immunohistochemistry (IHC).

=== Anal lesions ===
==== Anal intraepithelial neoplasia ====
Histopathologic changes seen in LSIL of the cervix can also be seen in anal epithelium. Koilocytes are characteristic of LSIL in the anus. In contrast to LSIL, HSIL in the anus consists of abnormal basaloid cells replacing more than half of the anal epithelium.

== Interpretation ==
These changes occur in the presence of human papillomavirus and occasionally can lead to cervical intraepithelial neoplasia, and if left untreated some may eventually progress to malignant cancer.
