= Intraepithelial neoplasia =

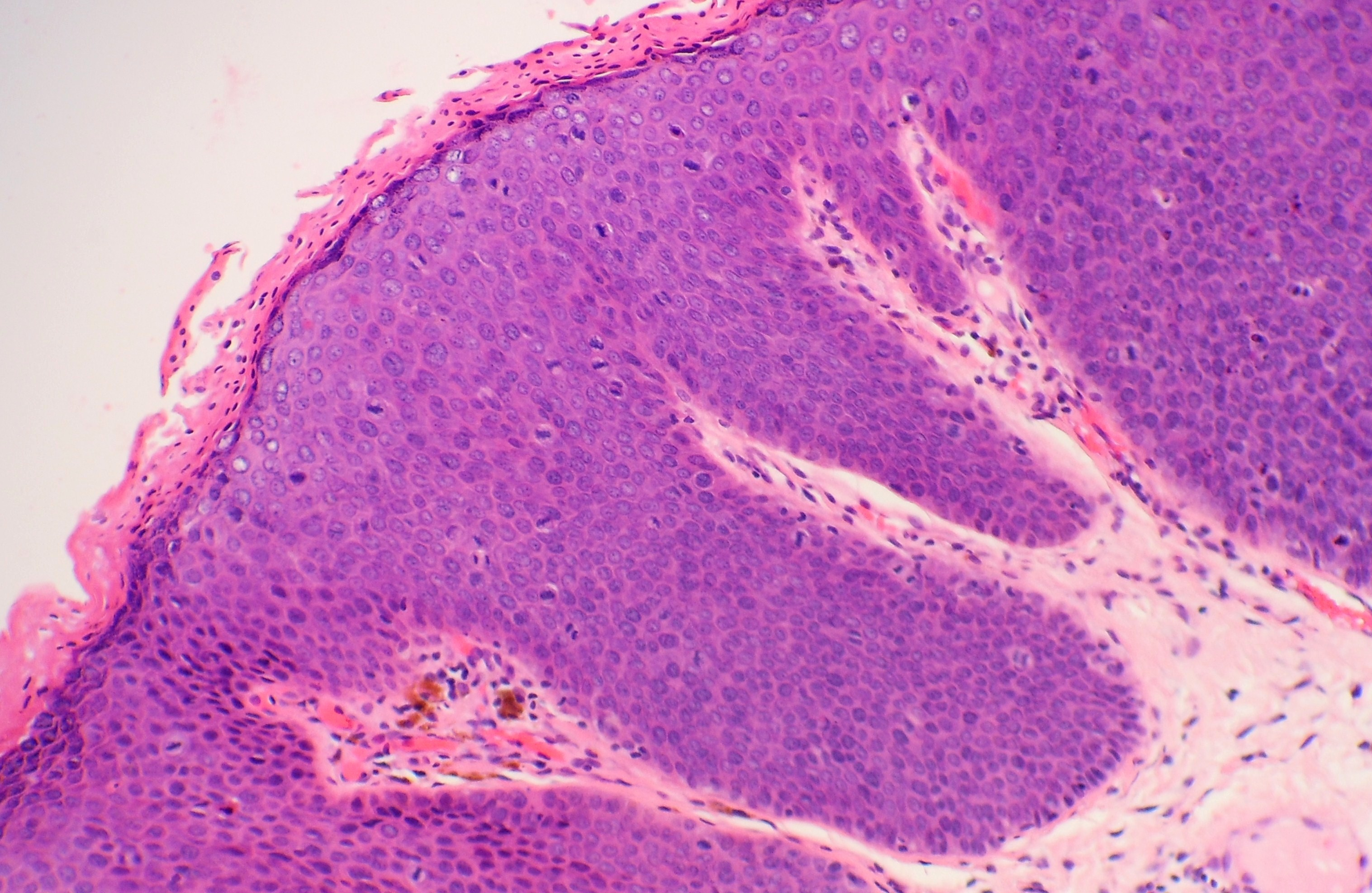
High grade anal intraepithelial neoplasia.

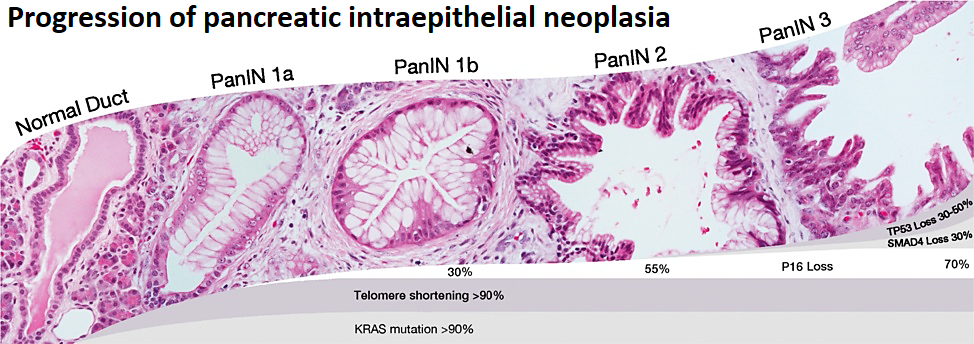
Progression of pancreatic intraepithelial neoplasia, including mutations.

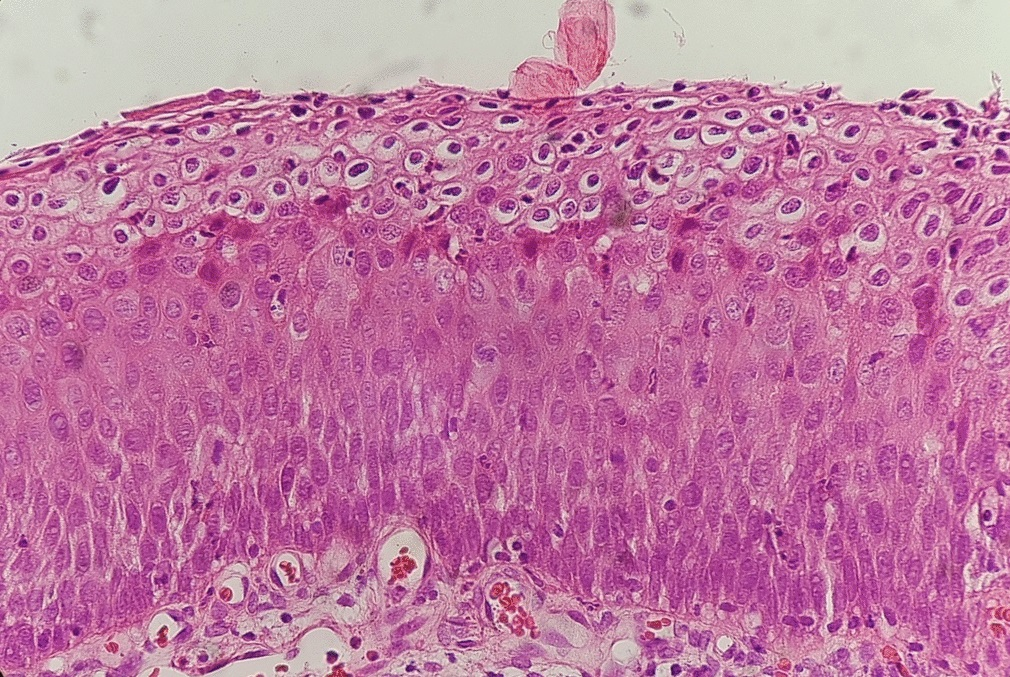
Cervical intraepithelial neoplasia (CIN), spanning a bit more than 2/3 of the thickness of the cervical epithelium.

Intraepithelial neoplasia (IEN) is the development of a benign neoplasia or high-grade dysplasia in an epithelium. The exact dividing line between dysplasia and neoplasia has been very difficult to draw throughout the era of medical science. It varies between persons. In the localizations shown below, the term intraepithelial neoplasia is used to describe more accurately what was historically referred to as epithelial dysplasia. IEN is not cancer, but it is associated with higher risk for developing cancer in future. It is thus sometimes a precancerous condition.

== Localizations ==
Localization	Usual acronym
anal intraepithelial neoplasia	AIN
biliary intraepithelial neoplasia	BILIN
cervical intraepithelial neoplasia	CIN
endometrial intraepithelial neoplasia	EIN
esophageal intraepithelial neoplasia	EIEN
gastrointestinal intraepithelial neoplasia	GIN
pancreatic intraepithelial neoplasia	PanIN
penile intraepithelial neoplasia	PEIN
prostatic intraepithelial neoplasia	PIN
vaginal intraepithelial neoplasia	VIN
vulvar intraepithelial neoplasia	VIN
