= Squamous intraepithelial lesion =

Abnormal cell growth in the cervix

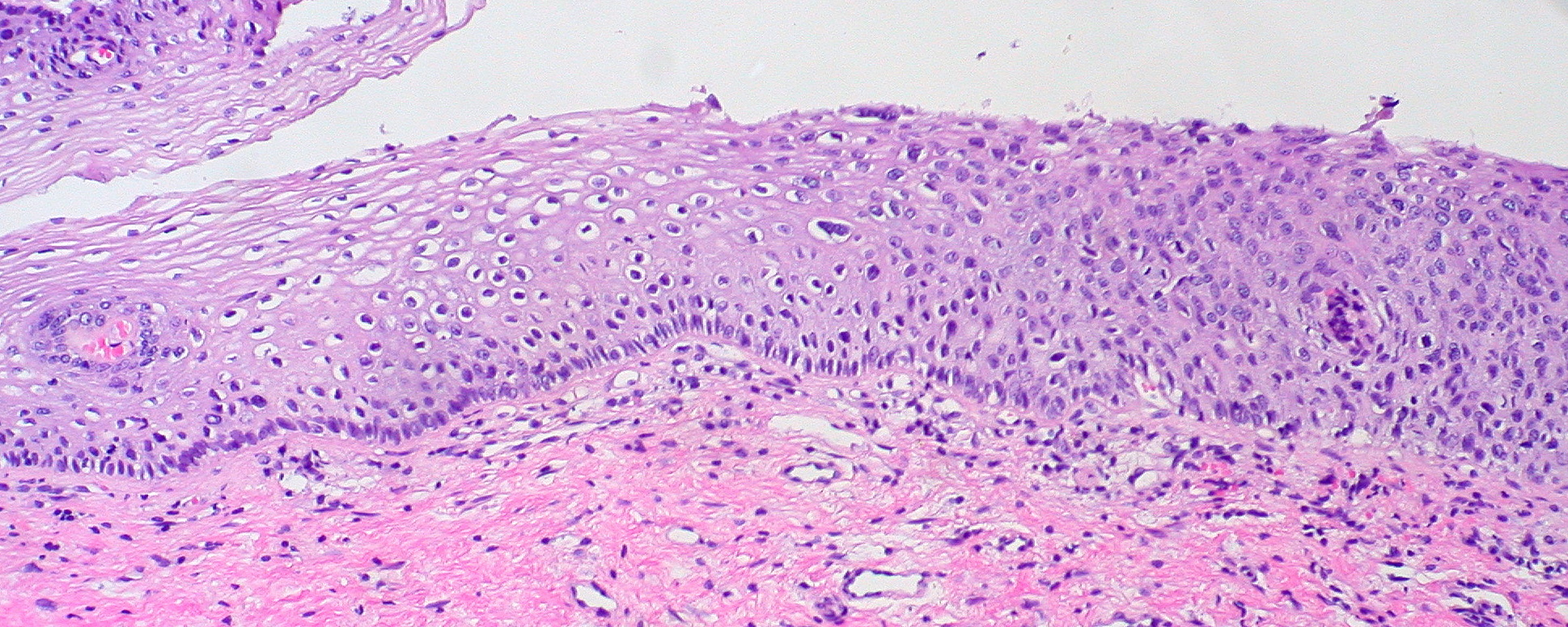
LEEP cone biopsy displaying normal cervical epithelium (far left) progressing to borderline koilocytosis, to LSIL, and to HSIL (far right).

A squamous intraepithelial lesion (SIL) is a human papillomavirus (HPV)-associated precancerous lesion of the squamous epithelium of the lower genital tract. According to the College of American Pathologists (CAP) and the American Society for Colposcopy and Cervical Pathology (ASCCP), these lesions can be classified as either low-grade squamous intraepithelial lesions (LSIL) or high-grade squamous intraepithelial lesions (HSIL). SIL is an umbrella term that encompasses intraepithelial lesions that occur at various anatomic locations, such as the cervix, vagina, vulva, or anus. The Bethesda system, an established system for reporting cervical and vaginal cytology, uses HSIL and LSIL to categorize cytologic abnormalities found on the cervix.

Squamous intraepithelial lesions are a cytologic interpretation most commonly identified on Pap smear for cervical cancer screening. A finding of SIL warrants further evaluation to establish a histologic diagnosis. Additional procedures, such as a colposcopy or biopsy of the cervix, vagina, or vulva, may be performed to confirm the diagnosis. When high-risk abnormalities are identified, management may include treatment with procedures such as loop electrosurgical excision procedure (LEEP), cold knife conization, or cryosurgery to remove affected tissue.

== LSIL vs. HSIL ==
A squamous intraepithelial lesion is characterized by cytologic abnormalities such as nuclear enlargement, abnormal nuclear borders, and cellular immaturity. Low-grade squamous intraepithelial lesions have mild morphologic changes compared to those found in HSIL.

=== LSIL ===
A low-grade squamous intraepithelial lesion (LSIL) is characterized as mild dysplasia of the squamous epithelium and is typically caused by transient HPV infections. LSIL will often resolve spontaneously within 2 years. LSIL is identified on 1-2% of Pap smears, with greater than 80% being positive for high-risk HPV. For persistent HPV infection, there is an increased risk of progression to high-grade precancerous lesions. In the Bethesda system, cervical intraepithelial neoplasia 1 (CIN 1) corresponds to LSIL. The HPV status of LSIL is helpful in determining the risk for higher grade cervical intraepithelial neoplasia. HPV-positive LSIL is associated with a higher risk of detecting CIN 3 at time of colonoscopy compared to HPV-negative LSIL.

=== HSIL ===
High-grade squamous intraepithelial lesion (HSIL) is characterized as moderate to severe dysplasia of the squamous epithelium and has a lower rate of spontaneous regression than LSIL. Approximately 95% of HSIL cases are associated with high-risk HPV. If treated appropriately, HSIL usually does not progress to invasive cancer, but if untreated, there is a 30% chance of progression to invasive cancer over 30 years. In the Bethesda system, CIN 2 and 3 correspond to HSIL. Findings of HSIL on Pap smear warrant further evaluation, typically including colposcopy and biopsy.

== HPV association and risk factors ==
Squamous intraepithelial lesions are strongly associated with infection by high-risk types of human papillomavirus (HPV). HPV types associated with carcinogenesis are classified as high-risk HPV. At least 13 HPV genotypes are known to be associated with cancer, with HPV-16 accounting for over 50% of cervical cancer cases. HPV-18 is another high-risk type and is identified in approximately 20% of cervical cancers.

Because of the strong association between HPV infection and squamous intraepithelial lesions, risk factors include conditions that increase HPV exposure or persistence. Examples of risk factors for SIL and subsequent cervical cancer include smoking, immunocompromised state, early onset of sexual activity, and multiple sexual partners.

== Screening ==
=== Pap smear ===
A Papanicolaou smear, commonly known as a Pap smear, is a standardized screening test for cervical cancer. The test involves collecting cells from the cervix to detect precancerous or cancerous lesions. The examined cells are typically obtained from the transformation zone of the cervix, an area susceptible to neoplastic transformation. Pap smears allow identification of cytologic abnormalities such as low-grade squamous intraepithelial lesions (LSIL) and high-grade squamous intraepithelial lesions (HSIL).

=== HPV testing ===
Human papillomavirus (HPV) testing may also be performed during Pap smear screening. Several high-risk HPV tests have been approved by the U.S. Food and Drug Administration (FDA) for use alongside Pap smear cytology. Clinical studies have demonstrated that co-testing, which combines Pap smear cytology with high-risk HPV testing, improves detection of high-grade squamous intraepithelial lesions compared with cytology alone.

== Management ==
Identification of high-risk HPV or an abnormal Pap smear may prompt further examination. Risk stratification based on likelihood of progression to invasive cancer and regression of HPV is used when determining if colposcopy is recommended. A colposcopy is indicated when the immediate risk of cervical intraepithelial neoplasia (CIN) 3+ is greater than 4%. A colposcopy is an examination procedure that uses binocular magnification to detect vulvar, vaginal or cervical dysplasia. Colposcopy-directed biopsy is performed when acetowhite tissue or abnormal vascular changes on the cervix, vagina, or vulva are present.

Low-grade squamous intraepithelial lesions (LSIL) with colposcopy results less than CIN 2 are generally managed with surveillance and follow-up HPV testing. HSIL identified on cytology but corresponding to CIN 1 or less on biopsy may be managed with an excisional procedure or observation with follow-up HPV testing and repeat colposcopy. In patients with both cytologic and histologic HSIL (CIN 2 or CIN 3), treatment is generally recommended and observation is discouraged. Treatment options include loop electrosurgical excision procedure (LEEP), cold knife conization, or cryosurgery.
