= Vaginal intraepithelial neoplasia =

- Specialty: Oncology

Vaginal intraepithelial neoplasia (VAIN) is a condition that describes premalignant histological findings in the vagina characterized by dysplastic changes.

The disorder is rare and generally has no symptoms. VAIN can be detected by the presence of abnormal cells in a Papanicolaou test (Pap smear).

Like cervical intraepithelial neoplasia, VAIN comes in three stages, VAIN 1, 2, and 3. In VAIN 1, a third of the thickness of the cells in the vaginal skin are abnormal, while in VAIN 3, the full thickness is affected. VAIN 3 is also known as carcinoma in-situ, or stage 0 vaginal cancer.

Infection with certain types of the human papillomavirus ("high-risk types") may be associated with up to 80% of cases of VAIN. Vaccinating with HPV vaccine before initial sexual contact has been shown to reduce incidence of VAIN.
