= HIST1H2AC =

Protein-coding gene in the species Homo sapiens

H2AC6

Identifiers
- Aliases: H2AC6, H2A/l, H2AFL, dJ221C16.4, histone cluster 1, H2ac, histone cluster 1 H2A family member c, HIST1H2AC, H2A clustered histone 6
- External IDs: OMIM: 602794; MGI: 2448302; GeneCards: H2AC6

Gene location (Human)
Chr.	Chromosome 6 (human)
Band	6p22.2	Start	26,124,145 bp
Band	6p22.2	End	26,139,116 bp

Gene location (Mouse)
Chr.	Chromosome 13 (mouse)
Band	13|13 A3.1	Start	21,994,635 bp
Band	13|13 A3.1	End	21,995,114 bp
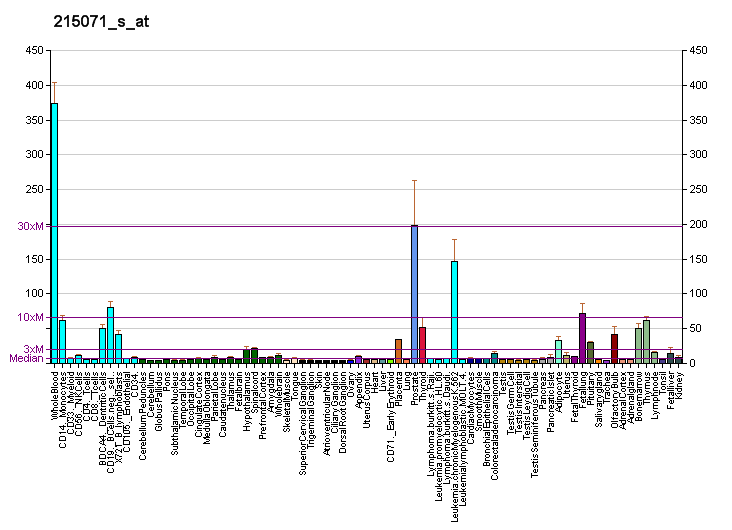
RNA expression pattern
Bgee	Human / Mouse (ortholog); Top expressed in: monocyte; blood; buccal mucosa cell; pericardium; jejunal mucosa; mucosa of transverse colon; optic nerve; granulocyte; bone marrow; C1 segment / Top expressed in: embryo; embryo; neural tube; blastocyst; urinary bladder; morula; tail of embryo; granulocyte; bone marrow; mesencephalon; More reference expression data
BioGPS	More reference expression data
Gene ontology
Molecular function	protein heterodimerization activity; DNA binding; molecular function
Cellular component	nucleosome; nucleus; chromosome; extracellular exosome; nucleoplasm
Biological process	negative regulation of cell population proliferation; chromatin organization
Sources:Amigo / QuickGO
Orthologs
Databases	NCBI: entry; OMA: entry
Species	Human	Mouse
Entrez	8334	665433
Ensembl	ENSG00000180573	ENSMUSG00000094248
UniProt	Q93077	C0HKE2; B2RVF0; C0HKE1; C0HKE3; C0HKE4 C0HKE5; C0HKE6; C0HKE7; C0HKE8; C0HKE9
RefSeq (mRNA)	NM_003512	NM_001177544
RefSeq (protein)	NP_003503	NP_835496; NP_835495; NP_835494; NP_835491; NP_835489 NP_783591; NP_835493; NP_835496; NP_835489; NP_835495; NP_835494; NP_835491; NP_835492; NP_783591; NP_001171015; NP_835489; NP_001171015; NP_835496; NP_835491; NP_835493; NP_835494; NP_835495; NP_835492; NP_783591; NP_835494; NP_835489; NP_835495; NP_835491; NP_835492; NP_783591; NP_001171015; NP_835493; NP_835496; NP_835495; NP_835489; NP_835494; NP_835491; NP_835492; NP_783591; NP_001171015; NP_835493; NP_835496; NP_835492; NP_835491; NP_835489; NP_835495; NP_835494; NP_783591; NP_001171015; NP_835493; NP_835496; NP_835491; NP_835489; NP_835495; NP_835494; NP_835492; NP_783591; NP_001171015; NP_835493; NP_835496; NP_783591; NP_835489; NP_835495; NP_835494; NP_835491; NP_835492; NP_001171015; NP_835493; NP_835496; NP_783591; NP_835489; NP_835495; NP_835494; NP_835491; NP_835492; NP_001171015; NP_835493; NP_835496
Location (UCSC)	Chr 6: 26.12 – 26.14 Mb	Chr 13: 21.99 – 22 Mb
PubMed search
- Wikidata
View/Edit Human	View/Edit Mouse

Histone H2A type 1-C is a protein that in humans is encoded by the HIST1H2AC gene.

Histones are basic nuclear proteins that are responsible for the nucleosome structure of the chromosomal fiber in eukaryotes. Two molecules of each of the four core histones (H2A, H2B, H3, and H4) form an octamer, around which approximately 146 bp of DNA is wrapped in repeating units, called nucleosomes.

The linker histone, H1, interacts with linker DNA between nucleosomes and functions in the compaction of chromatin into higher order structures. This gene is intronless and encodes a member of the histone H2A family. Transcripts from this gene lack polyA tails but instead contain a palindromic termination element. This gene is found in the large histone gene cluster on chromosome 6.

== Cancer ==
HIST1H2AC gene has been observed progressively downregulated in Human papillomavirus-positive neoplastic keratinocytes derived from uterine cervical preneoplastic lesions at different levels of malignancy. For this reason, HIST1H2AC is likely to be associated with tumorigenesis and may be a potential prognostic marker for uterine cervical preneoplastic lesions progression.
