= HIST2H2BE =

Protein-coding gene in humans

H2BC21

Identifiers
- Aliases: H2BC21, GL105, H2B, H2B.1, H2BFQ, H2BGL105, H2BQ, histone cluster 2, H2be, histone cluster 2 H2B family member e, H2B clustered histone 21, HIST2H2BE, H2BE, H2B-GL105
- External IDs: OMIM: 601831; MGI: 2448409; GeneCards: H2BC21
Available structures
PDB	Ortholog search: PDBe RCSB
PDB	List of PDB id codes 4NFT

Gene location (Human)
Chr.	Chromosome 1 (human)
Band	1q21.2	Start	149,884,459 bp
Band	1q21.2	End	149,886,682 bp

Gene location (Mouse)
Chr.	Chromosome 13 (mouse)
Band	13|13 A3.1	Start	21,971,631 bp
Band	13|13 A3.1	End	21,973,383 bp
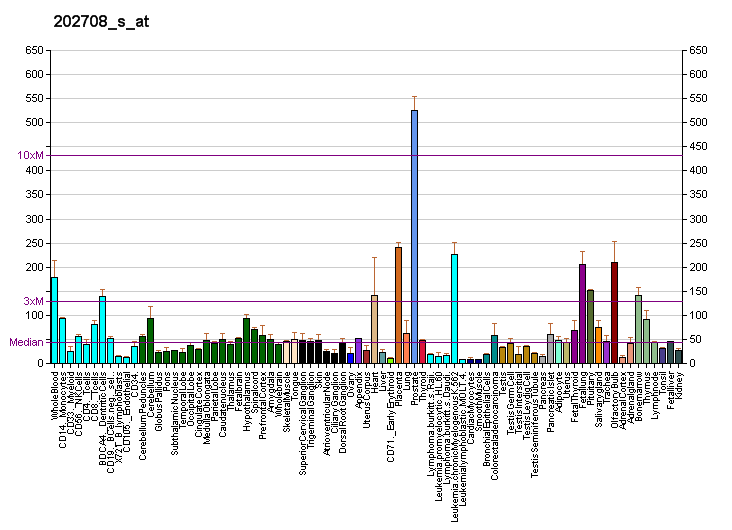
RNA expression pattern
Bgee	Human / Mouse (ortholog); Top expressed in: right ventricle; monocyte; left ventricle; right uterine tube; prostate; ganglionic eminence; apex of heart; myocardium of left ventricle; gastrocnemius muscle; tibialis anterior muscle / Top expressed in: spermatid; uterus; spermatocyte; testicle; genital tubercle; embryo; ileum; bone marrow; embryo; quadriceps femoris muscle; More reference expression data
BioGPS	More reference expression data
Gene ontology
Molecular function	protein heterodimerization activity; DNA binding
Cellular component	chromosome; extracellular exosome; nucleoplasm; nucleosome; nucleus; extracellular space; cytosol
Biological process	nucleosome assembly; innate immune response in mucosa; defense response to bacterium; antimicrobial humoral immune response mediated by antimicrobial peptide
Sources:Amigo / QuickGO
Orthologs
Databases	NCBI: entry; OMA: entry
Species	Human	Mouse
Entrez	8349	319188
Ensembl	ENSG00000184678	ENSMUSG00000069308
UniProt	Q16778	Q8CGP2
RefSeq (mRNA)	NM_003528	NM_001290466; NM_178202
RefSeq (protein)	NP_003519	NP_001277395; NP_835509
Location (UCSC)	Chr 1: 149.88 – 149.89 Mb	Chr 13: 21.97 – 21.97 Mb
PubMed search
- Wikidata
View/Edit Human	View/Edit Mouse

Histone H2B type 2-E is a protein that in humans is encoded by the HIST2H2BE gene.

Histones are basic nuclear proteins that are responsible for the nucleosome structure of the chromosomal fiber in eukaryotes. Two molecules of each of the four core histones (H2A, H2B, H3, and H4) form an octamer, around which approximately 146 bp of DNA is wrapped in repeating units, called nucleosomes. The linker histone, H1, interacts with linker DNA between nucleosomes and functions in the compaction of chromatin into higher order structures. This gene encodes a member of the histone H2B family, and generates two transcripts through the use of the conserved stem-loop termination motif, and the polyA addition motif.

== Cancer ==
HIST2H2BE gene has been detected progressively downregulated in Human papillomavirus-positive neoplastic keratinocytes derived from uterine cervical preneoplastic lesions at different levels of malignancy. For this reason, this gene is likely to be associated with tumorigenesis and may be a potential prognostic marker for uterine cervical preneoplastic lesions progression.
