= Metanephric dysplastic hematoma of the sacral region =

Metanephric dysplastic hematoma of the sacral region (MDHSR) has been described by Cozzutto and Lazzaroni-Fossati in 1980, by Posalaki et al. in 1981 and by Cozzutto et al. in 1982. Three additional cases were seen by Finegold.

== Case studies ==
The case reported by Cozzutto and Lazzaroni-Fossati involved a premature male newborn with bilateral renal dysplasia and a sacrococcygeal mass featuring a histological picture of renal dysplasia. The case reported by Cozzutto et al. and those studied by Finegold featured changes of renal dysplasia including immature tubules surrounded by a collarette of cellular mesenchyme, glomeruloid figures, tubules and nests of cartilage in a background of adipose tissue and fibrous tissue where muscle fibres, nerve bundles, and calcospherites were also seen.

The two cases reported by Posalaki et al. showed blastema, glomeruli, and tubuli. In several cases the mass was removed during reparative surgery for meningocele or myelomeningocele.

Alston et al. described immature renal tissue in a lumbosacral subcutaneous lipoma with intradural extension in a 6-day-old female. Horestein et al. reported a lumbosacral nephrogenic rest including blastema (mature tubules and nephrons) in abundant stroma unassociated to spinal dysraphism. The case reported by Ibrahim et al. in a 2-year-old boy comprised adipose and fibrous tissue with neuroglial elements, striated muscle fibres and clusters of glomeruloid structures and immature tubules.

Sacrococcygeal teratoma with nephroblastoma was reported by Ward and Dehner and by Trebbi et al. Cases of primary lumbosacral Wilms tumor were described by Abrahams et al. and by Govender et al.

It is therefore of primary importance the distinction of MDHSR from sacrococcygeal teratoma and from primary lumbosacral Wilms tumor.
