= Gastrointestinal intraepithelial neoplasia =

Gastrointestinal intraepithelial neoplasia is also known as gastrointestinal dysplasia. Gastrointestinal dysplasia refers to abnormal growth of the epithelial tissue lining the gastrointestinal tract including the esophagus, stomach, and colon. Pancreatic, biliary, and rectal intraepithelial neoplasia are discussed separately. The regions of abnormal growth are confined by the basement membrane adjacent to the epithelial tissue and are thought to represent pre-cancerous lesions.

In the GI tract, tumor progression is thought to occur in a series of steps. It begins with normal tissue and long-term inflammation causes the cells to undergo atrophy, metaplasia, dysplasia, and finally, becomes an adenoma or carcinoma. Given this progression, these lesions represent a potentially cancerous growths and an important opportunity to prevent gastrointestinal cancer.

== Epidemiology ==
Cancers of the GI tract (esophageal, gastric, and colorectal) are on the rise. Over the last 30 years there has been an increase in incidence of adenocarcinoma of the esophagus, gastroesophageal junction, and gastric cardia. Gastric cancer is the fourth most common malignant tumor and third most common cause of cancer related death. When gastric cancer is caught early, the five year survival rate is estimated to be around 90%. However when diagnosed at an advanced stage, survival falls to less than 30%. Colorectal cancer has demonstrated an increasing incidence in younger populations with the US lifetime risk estimated to be about 4%. Colorectal cancer is the second most common cause of cancer related deaths with the highest burden found in Australia, New Zealand, Europe, and North America.

== Signs and symptoms ==
Signs and symptoms vary based on the location of the tumor and as this is a pre-cancerous stage, many patients are asymptomatic. Symptoms associated with all types of GI cancers include weight loss, abdominal pain, and anemia. Specific symptoms include:

Esophageal lesion:

- trouble swallowing (dysphagia)
- painful swallowing (odynophagia)
- regurgitation of food
- aspiration of food
- hoarseness
- cough

Gastric lesion:

- early satiety
- nausea
- vomiting.

Colorectal lesions:

- change in bowel movements
- darkly colored stool (melena)
- rectal bleeding

== Risk factors ==
Risk factors also vary significantly based on the location and type of tumor. Risk factors for esophageal cancer include GERD, obesity, excessive alcohol use, and smoking. Other risks identified include high temperature foods, exposure to polycyclic aromatic hydrocarbons, and esophageal dysbiosis.

Risks for gastric cancer include chronic gastritis or inflammation. This can be caused by H. pylori infection, autoimmune gastritis, high salt diet, and smoking.

Colorectal cancer risk increases with increased consumption of red meat, low fiber diet, alcohol use, and obesity. A number of conditions may also increase your risk of colorectal cancer such as irritable bowel disease, familial adenomatous polyposis, lynch syndrome, and cystic fibrosis.

== Diagnosis ==
Diagnosis of these lesions is made through histologic examination of tissue samples obtained via endoscopic biopsy. When examining the samples, the histologist looks for evidence of dysplasia which is defined as “unequivocal neoplastic epithelium confined to the basement membrane”.

According to the WHO classification of Digestive System Tumors, these lesions are classified based on a two tier system. The two tiers or classifications are low or high grade dysplasia. Low grade dysplasia means that the tissue maintains the glandular structure, cellular variance (pleomorphism) is mild or absent, nuclei maintain basal polarity and mitotic activity is not markedly increased. Where as high grade dysplasia includes features such as complex glandular architecture, marked deviation from the cells typical appearance (unusually large nuclei with prominent nucleoli), loss of typical cellular structure, and frequent mitotic figures.

== Classification/grading ==
=== Paris Classification ===
The Paris Classification system, established in 2002, is used to classify superficial neoplastic lesions of the gastrointestinal tract based on their endoscopic appearance. This system of classification is clinically significant as it enables estimation of the depth of tumor invasion.

Type	Description	Subclasses
1	Polypoid	p: protruded, pedunculated s: sessile
2	Nonpolypoid	a: slightly elevated b: flat c: slightly depressed
3	Excavated	

=== Stomach ===
==== Vienna Classification ====
The Vienna classification of gastrointestinal neoplasia was published in 2000 in an attempt to resolve differences in diagnoses between Eastern and Western trained pathologists. This system utilizes cytological and architectural severity and depth of invasion.

Category	Classification	Subclasses
1	Negative for neoplasia/dysplasia	
2	Indefinite for neoplasia/dysplasia	
3	Non-invasive low grade neoplasia (low grade adenoma/dysplasia)	
4	Non-invasive high-grade neoplasia	Category 4: 1. High grade adenoma 2. Non-invasive carcinoma 3. Suspicion of invasive carcinoma
5	Invasive neoplasia	Category 5: 1. intramucosal carcinoma 2. Submucosal carcinoma

==== Japanese Society for Gastroenterological Endoscopy classification ====
The classification system commonly used to classify early gastric cancers was established in 1998 in Japan. This system utilizes visual and endoscopic features for classification and was developed to better assess which lesions were at higher risk of invasion.

Type	Type	Subclasses
1	Polypoid/protuberant	1p: pedunculated 1ps/sp: Subpedunculated 1s: sessile
2	Flat	2a: superficial elevated 2b: flat 2c: flat depressed
3	Ulcerated	
4	Lateral spreading tumor	

== Treatment ==
In 2020, the American Gastroenterological Association (AGA) posted updated clinical practice guidelines on the management of gastric intestinal metaplasia. Recommendation #1 by AGA suggests that patients with diagnosed GIM should undergo testing for H. Pylori followed by treatment if results are positive. Recommendation #2 by AGA suggests that patients with GIM do not routine use of endoscopic surveillance; however, AGA does state that while there is no direct evidence that promotes a particular surveillance interval, many physicians may recommend an upper endoscopy every 3-5 years for direct visualization of the mucosa and possible biopsy in patients with GIM based on shared decision-making. Recommendation #3 by AGA suggests that in patients with GIM, routine short-interval (<12 months) repeat endoscopy for risk stratification may not be necessary; however, patients with GIM who have a possible increased risk of gastric cancer may elect to have repeat endoscopies after having a shared decision-making conversation with their physician.
