= Anal dysplasia =

Pre-cancerous condition of the anal canal

Anal dysplasia is a pre-cancerous condition which occurs when the lining of the anal canal undergoes abnormal changes. It can be classified as low grade squamous intraepithelial lesions (LSIL) and high-grade squamous intraepithelial lesions (HSIL). Most cases are not associated with symptoms, but people may notice lumps in and around the anus.

== Causes ==
Anal dysplasia is most commonly linked to human papillomavirus (HPV), a usually sexually-transmitted infection. HPV is the most common sexually transmitted infection in the United States while genital herpes (HSV) was the most common sexually transmitted infection globally.

== See also ==
- Human papillomavirus
- Anal cancer
