= Hematoma =

Localized bleeding outside of blood vessels

- Other names: haematoma
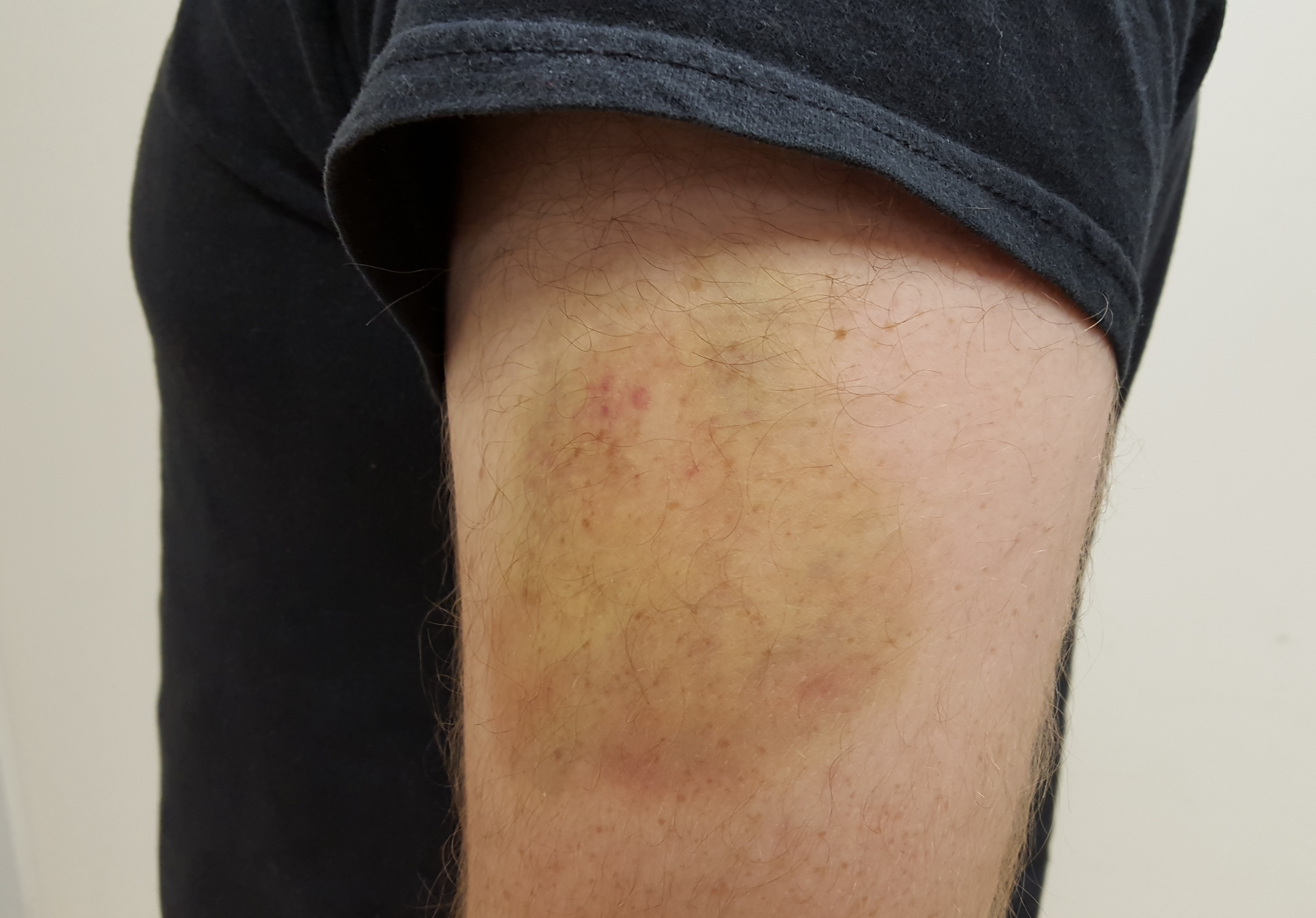
- Contusion (bruise), a simple form of hematoma
- Specialty: Emergency medicine

A hematoma, also spelled haematoma, or blood suffusion is a localized bleeding outside of blood vessels, due to either disease or trauma including injury or surgery and may involve blood continuing to seep from broken capillaries. A hematoma is benign and is initially in liquid form spread among the tissues including in sacs between tissues where it may coagulate and solidify before blood is reabsorbed into blood vessels. An ecchymosis is a hematoma of the skin larger than 10 mm.

They may occur among and or within many areas such as skin and other organs, connective tissues, bone, joints and muscle.

A collection of blood (or even a hemorrhage) may be aggravated by anticoagulant medication (blood thinner). Blood seepage and collection of blood may occur if heparin is given via an intramuscular route; to avoid this, heparin must be given intravenously or subcutaneously.

== Signs and symptoms ==
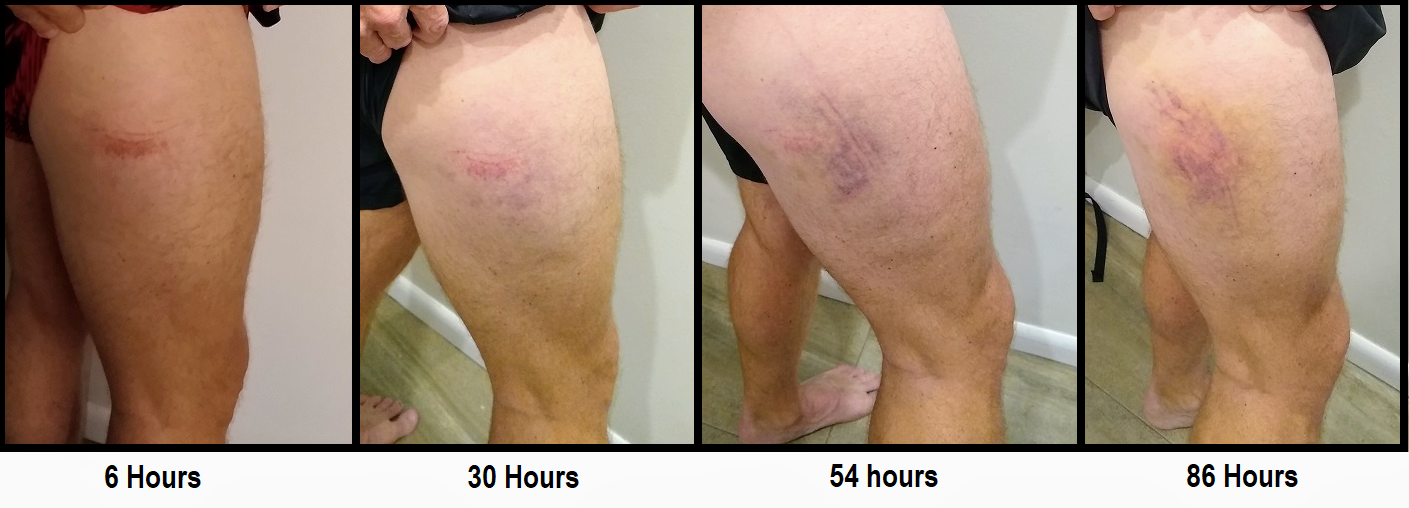
Intramuscular hematoma development and progression on the vastus lateralis muscle from 6 hours after trauma to 86 hours

Some hematomas are visible under the surface of the skin (commonly called bruises) or possibly felt as masses or lumps. Lumps may be caused by the limitation of the blood to a sac, subcutaneous or intramuscular tissue space isolated by fascial planes. This is an anatomical feature that helps prevent injuries from causing massive blood loss. In most cases a hematoma as a sac of blood eventually dissolves; however, in some cases it may continue to grow due to blood seepage or show no change. If the sac of blood does not disappear, then it may need to be surgically cleaned out or repaired.

The slow process of reabsorption of hematomas can allow the broken down blood cells and hemoglobin pigment to move in the connective tissue. For example, an injury to the base of the thumb might cause a hematoma that moves slowly throughout the finger over the course of a week. Gravity is the main determinant of this process.

Hematomas on articulations can reduce mobility of a member and present roughly the same symptoms as a fracture.

In most cases, movement and exercise of the affected muscle is the best way to introduce the collection back into the bloodstream.

== Classification ==
=== Types ===
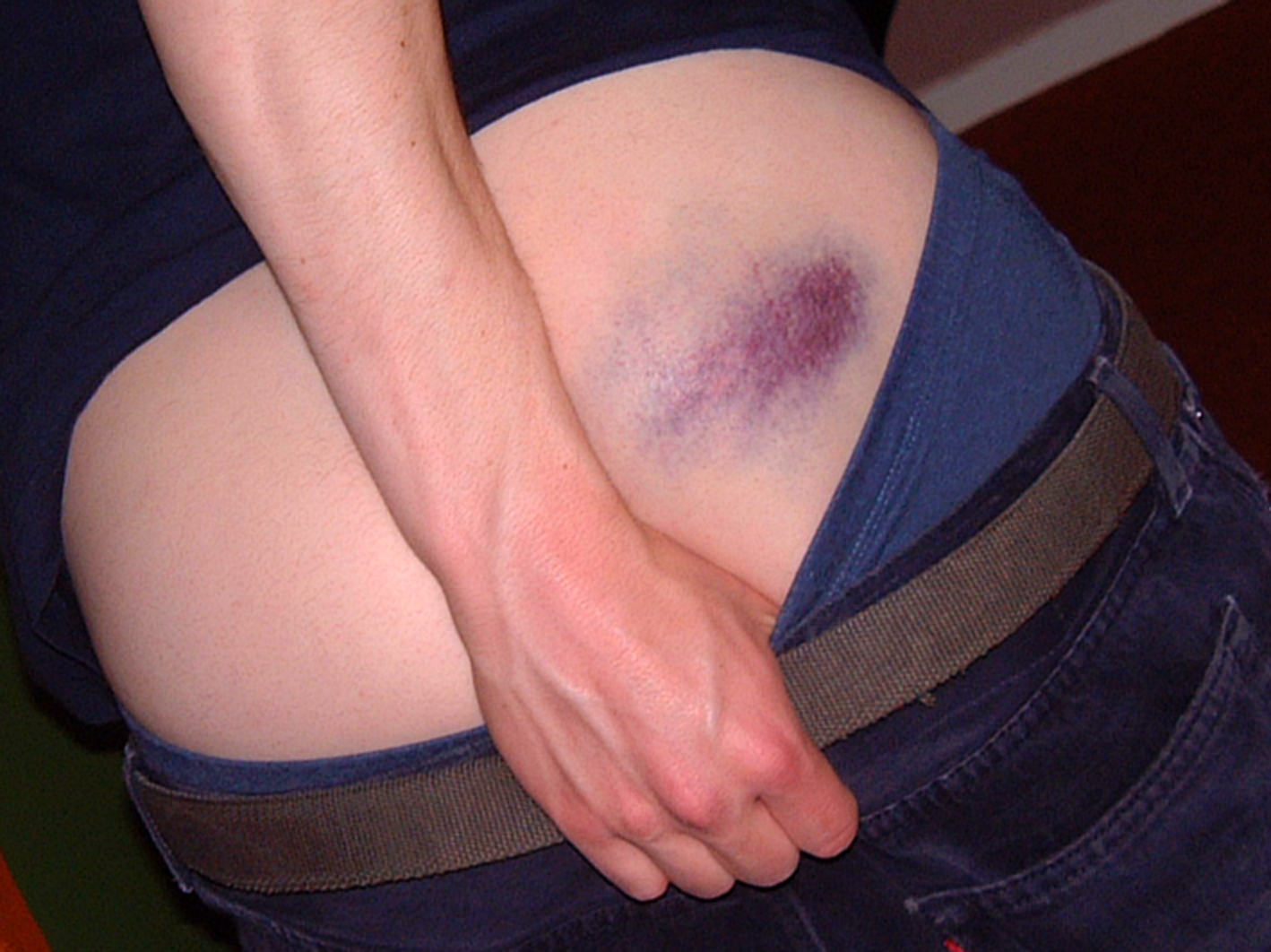
Intramuscular hematoma at buttocks as a result of a sports injury

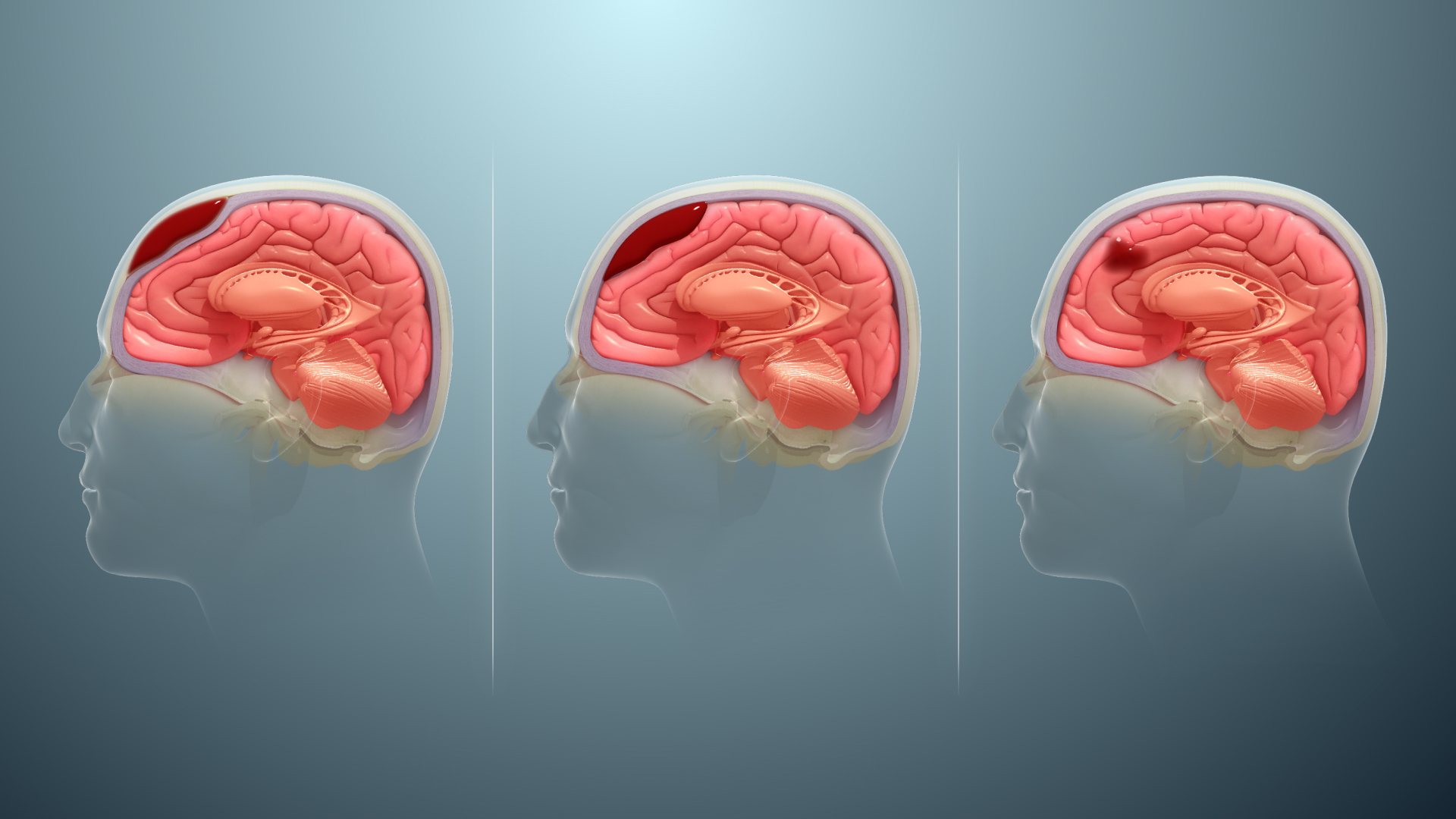
Left to right: Epidural, subdural, and intracranial hematoma of the brain

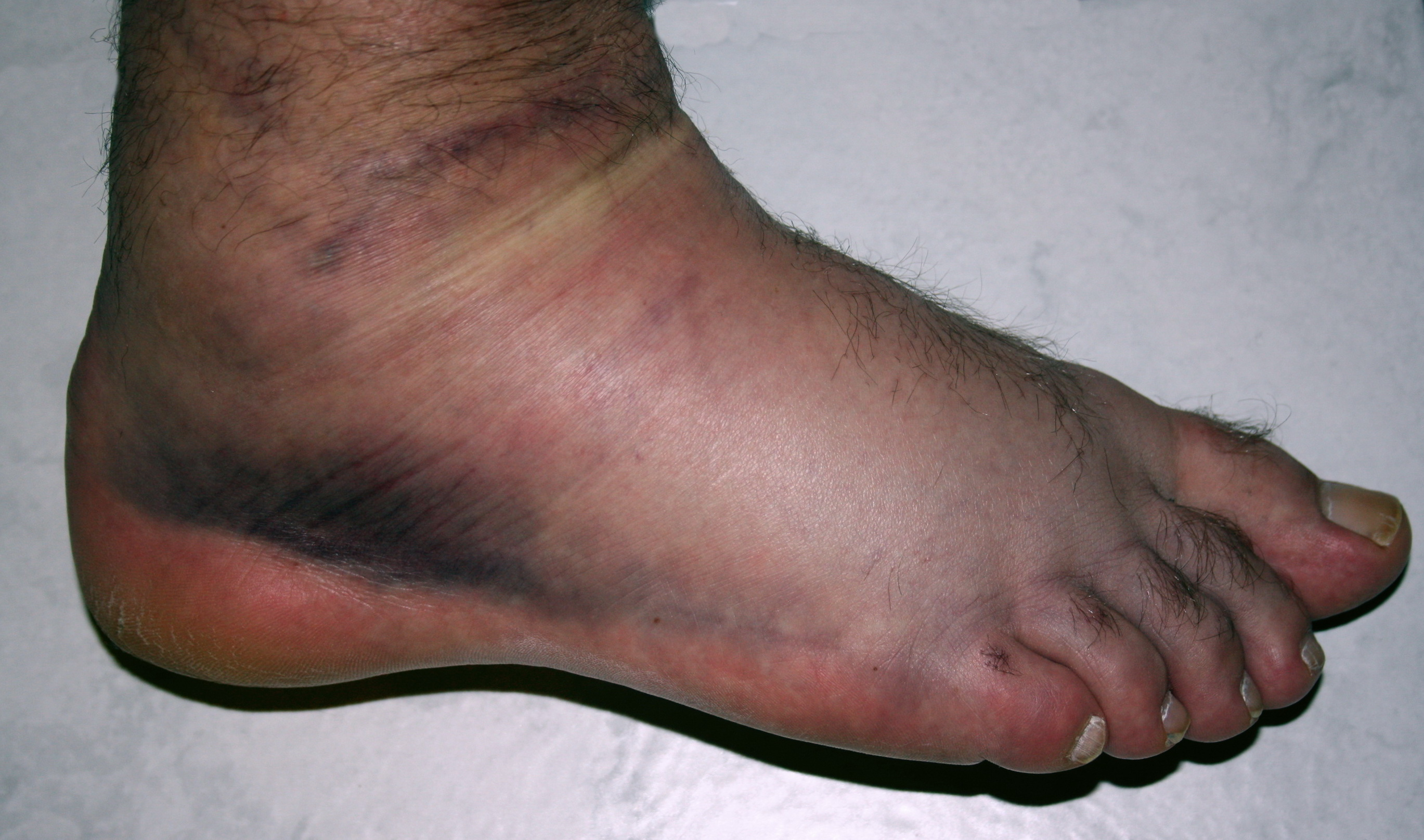
Hematoma of the ankle caused by a 3rd degree sprain

- Subdermal hematoma (under the skin)
- Intramuscular hematoma (inside muscle tissue)
- Skull/brain:
  - Subgaleal hematoma – between the galea aponeurosis and periosteum
  - Cephalohematoma – between the periosteum and skull. Commonly caused by vacuum delivery and vertex delivery.
  - Epidural hematoma – between the skull and dura mater
  - Subdural hematoma – between the dura mater and arachnoid mater
  - Subarachnoid hematoma – between the arachnoid mater and pia mater (the subarachnoid space)
  - Othematoma – between the skin and the layers of cartilage of the ear
- Breast hematoma (breast)
- Perichondral hematoma (ear)
- Perianal hematoma (anus)
- Subungual hematoma (nail)
- Rectus sheath hematoma
- Genital hematoma

=== Degrees ===
- Petechiae – small pinpoint hematomas less than 3 mm in diameter;
- Purpura (purple) – a bruise about 3–10 mm in diameter, generally round in shape;
- Ecchymosis – subcutaneous extravasation of blood in a thin layer under the skin, i.e. bruising, over 1 cm in diameter.

== Etymology ==
The English word "haematoma" came into use in 1826. The word derives from the Greek αἷμα haima "blood" and -ωμα -oma, a suffix forming nouns indicating a mass or tumor.

== See also ==
- Metanephric dysplastic hematoma of the sacral region
- Welts
