= Carcinoma in situ =

Pre-cancerous abnormal growth of tissue

- Other names: in situ neoplasm
- Specialty: Oncology

Carcinoma in situ (CIS) is a group of abnormal cells. While they are a form of neoplasm, there is disagreement over whether CIS should be classified as cancer. This controversy also depends on the exact CIS in question (e.g., cervical, skin, breast). Some authors do not classify them as cancer, however, recognizing that they can potentially become cancer. Others classify certain types as a non-invasive form of cancer. U.S. surgical pathologist Albert C. Broders introduced both the term and concept of carcinoma in situ in 1932. The term "pre-cancer" has also been used.

These abnormal cells grow in their normal place, thus in situ (Latin for 'in its place'). For example, carcinoma in situ of the skin, also called Bowen's disease, is the accumulation of dysplastic epidermal cells within the epidermis only, that has failed to penetrate into the deeper dermis. For this reason, CIS will usually not form a tumor. Rather, the lesion is flat (in the skin, cervix, etc.) or follows the existing architecture of the organ (in the breast, lung, etc.). Exceptions include CIS of the colon (polyps), the bladder (preinvasive papillary cancer), or the breast (ductal carcinoma in situ or lobular carcinoma in situ).

Many forms of CIS have a high probability of progression into cancer, and therefore removal may be recommended; however, progression of CIS is known to be highly variable and not all CIS becomes invasive cancer.

In the TNM classification, carcinoma in situ is reported as TisN0M0 (stage 0).

== Terminology ==
These terms are related since they represent the steps of the progression toward cancer:

- Dysplasia is the earliest form of precancerous lesion recognizable in a biopsy. Dysplasia can be low-grade or high-grade. High-grade dysplasia may also be referred to as carcinoma in situ.
- Invasive carcinoma, usually simply called cancer, has the potential to invade and spread to surrounding tissues and structures, and may eventually be lethal.

== Examples ==
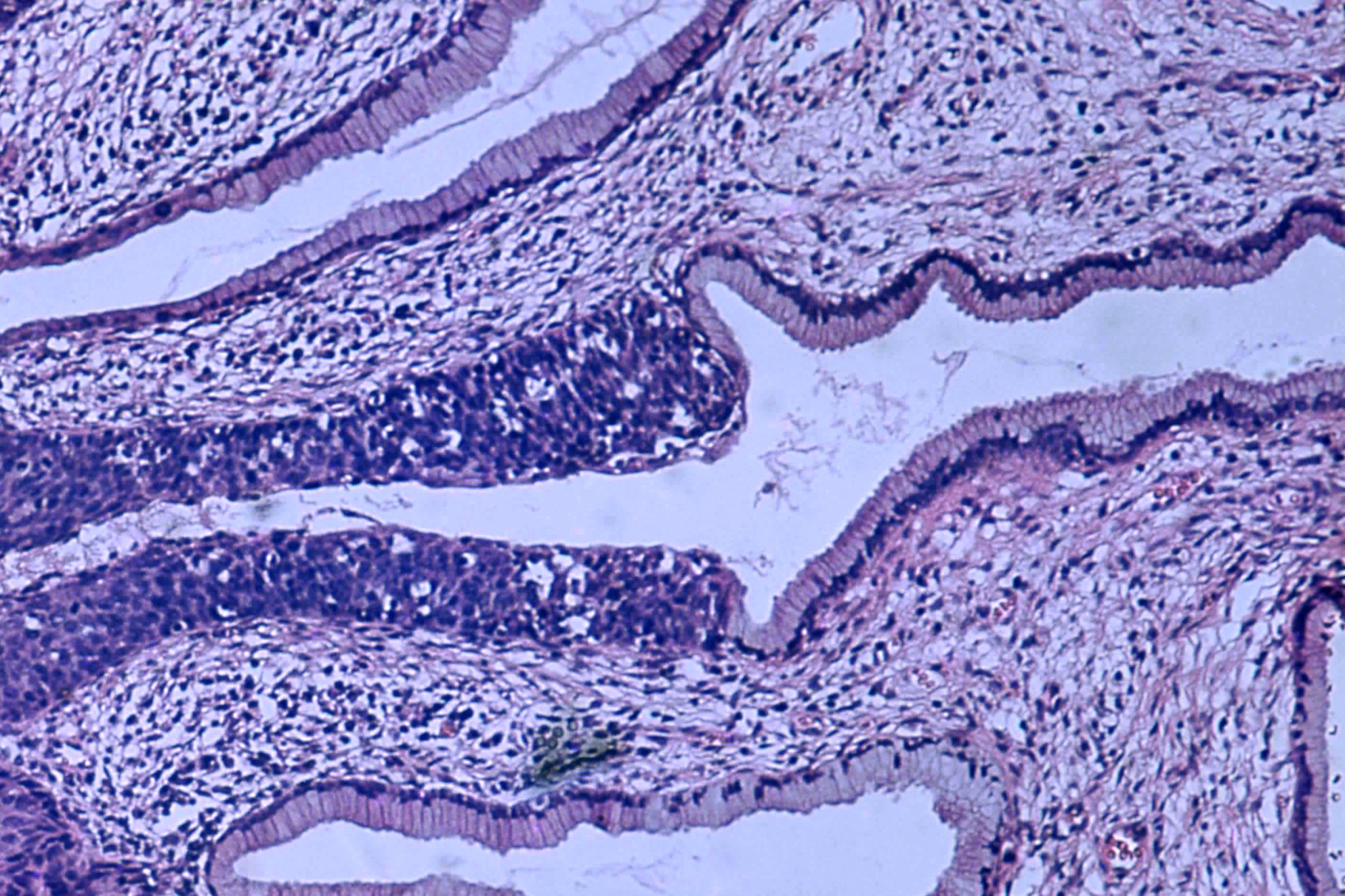
High-grade dysplasia (carcinoma in situ) in the uterine cervix: The abnormal epithelium is extending into a mucous gland to the left of center. This disease can progress to invasive cancer (squamous cell carcinoma) of the cervix.

- Cervical squamous intraepithelial lesion (SIL), previously called cervical intraepithelial neoplasia (CIN), is a form of dysplasia that can progress to cervical cancer. The term carcinoma in situ may be used interchangeably with high-grade SIL.
- Ductal carcinoma in situ of the breast is the most common precancer in women.
- Bowen's disease is a squamous carcinoma in situ of the skin.
- Colon polyps often contain areas of CIS that will almost always transform into colon cancer if left untreated.
- High-grade prostatic intraepithelial neoplasia is equivalent to CIS of the prostate.
- Bronchioloalveolar carcinoma (BAC) of the lung is the only form of CIS that can kill directly because, in rare cases (the "pneumonic form"), it expands greatly and fills the lungs, preventing breathing and causing other dire effects on the host. Thus, the pneumonic form of BAC is a true malignant entity, but is not "invasive" in the classical sense. For this reason, it is considered a form of CIS by pathologists, but not by oncologists or surgeons, and inclusion of this form of cancer among the types of CIS is controversial.

== Treatment ==
Carcinoma in situ is, by definition, a localized phenomenon, with no potential for metastasis unless it progresses into cancer. Therefore, its removal eliminates the risk of subsequent progression into a life-threatening condition.

Some forms of CIS (e.g., colon polyps and polypoid tumours of the bladder) can be removed using an endoscope, without conventional surgical resection. Dysplasia of the uterine cervix is removed by excision (cutting it out) or by burning with a laser. Bowen's disease of the skin is removed by excision. Other forms require major surgery, the best known being intraductal carcinoma of the breast (also treated with radiotherapy).
