= Cervical intraepithelial neoplasia =

- Other names: Cervical dysplasia
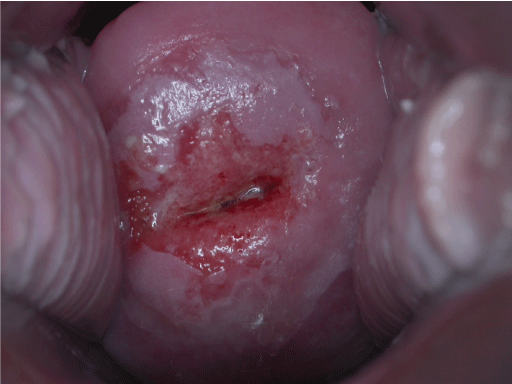
- Positive visual inspection with acetic acid of the cervix for CIN-1
- Specialty: Gynecology

Cervical intraepithelial neoplasia (CIN), also known as cervical dysplasia, is the abnormal growth of cells on the surface of the cervix that could potentially lead to cervical cancer. More specifically, CIN refers to the potentially precancerous transformation of cells of the cervix.

CIN most commonly occurs at the squamocolumnar junction of the cervix, a transitional area between the squamous epithelium of the vagina and the columnar epithelium of the endocervix. It can also occur in vaginal walls and vulvar epithelium. CIN is graded on a 1–3 scale, with 3 being the most abnormal (see classification section below).

Human papillomavirus (HPV) infection is necessary for the development of CIN, but not all with this infection develop cervical cancer. Many women with HPV infection never develop CIN or cervical cancer. Typically, HPV resolves on its own. However, those with an HPV infection that lasts more than one or two years have a higher risk of developing a higher grade of CIN.

Like other intraepithelial neoplasias, CIN is not cancer and is usually curable. Most cases of CIN either remain stable or are eliminated by the person's immune system without need for intervention. However, a small percentage of cases progress to cervical cancer, typically cervical squamous cell carcinoma (SCC), if left untreated.

== Signs and symptoms ==
There are no specific symptoms of CIN alone.

Generally, signs and symptoms of cervical cancer include:

- abnormal or post-menopausal bleeding
- abnormal discharge
- changes in bladder or bowel function
- pelvic pain on examination
- abnormal appearance or palpation of the cervix.

HPV infection of the vulva and vagina can cause genital warts or be asymptomatic.

== Causes ==
The cause of CIN is chronic infection of the cervix with HPV, especially infection with high-risk HPV types 16 or 18. It is thought that the high-risk HPV infections can inactivate tumor suppressor genes such as the p53 gene and the RB gene, thus allowing the infected cells to grow unchecked and accumulate successive mutations, eventually leading to cancer.

Some groups of women are at a higher risk of developing CIN:

- Infection with a high-risk type of HPV, such as 16, 18, 31, or 33
- Immunodeficiency (e.g., HIV infection)
- Poor diet
- Multiple sex partners
- Lack of condom use
- Cigarette smoking

Additionally, several risk factors have been shown to increase an individual's likelihood of developing CIN 3/carcinoma in situ (see below):

- Women who give birth before age 17
- Women who have > 1 full term pregnancies

== Pathophysiology ==
Transformation zone

The earliest microscopic change corresponding to CIN is epithelial dysplasia, or surface lining, of the cervix, which is essentially undetectable by the woman. The majority of these changes occur at the squamocolumnar junction, or transformation zone, an area of unstable cervical epithelium that is prone to abnormal changes. Cellular changes associated with HPV infection, such as koilocytes, are also commonly seen in CIN. While infection with HPV is needed for the development of CIN, most women with HPV infection do not develop high-grade intraepithelial lesions or cancer. HPV is not alone enough causative.

Of the over 100 different types of HPV, approximately 40 are known to affect the epithelial tissue of the anogenital area and have different probabilities of causing malignant changes.

== Diagnosis ==
A test for HPV called the Digene HPV test is highly accurate. It serves as both a direct diagnosis and an adjuvant to the Pap smear, which is a screening device that allows for an examination of cells but not tissue structure, needed for diagnosis. A colposcopy with directed biopsy is the standard for disease detection. Endocervical brush sampling at the time of Pap smear to detect adenocarcinoma and its precursors is necessary, along with doctor/patient vigilance on abdominal symptoms associated with uterine and ovarian carcinoma. The diagnosis of CIN or cervical carcinoma requires a biopsy for histological analysis.

=== Classification ===
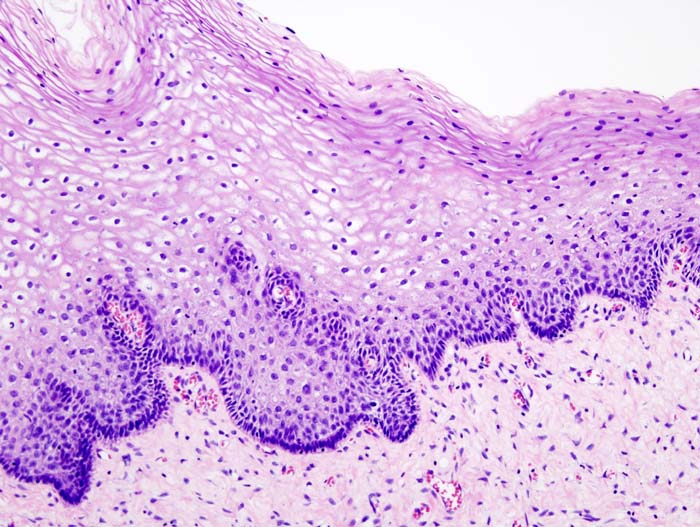
Normal cervical epithelium

Historically, abnormal changes of cervical epithelial cells were described as mild, moderate, or severe epithelial dysplasia. In 1988 the National Cancer Institute developed "The Bethesda System for Reporting Cervical/Vaginal Cytologic Diagnoses". This system provides a uniform way to describe abnormal epithelial cells and determine specimen quality, thus providing clear guidance for clinical management. These abnormalities were classified as squamous or glandular and then further classified by the stage of dysplasia: atypical cells, mild, moderate, severe, and carcinoma.

Depending on several factors and the location of the lesion, CIN can start in any of the three stages and can either progress or regress. The grade of squamous intraepithelial lesion can vary.

CIN is classified in grades:

Histology Grade	Corresponding Cytology	Description	Image
CIN 1 (Grade I)	Low-grade squamous intraepithelial lesion (LSIL)	Mild epithelial dysplasia; Confined to the basal 1/3 of the epithelium; Typically corresponds to infection with HPV; High rate of regression back to normal cells; Usually managed expectantly	
CIN 2/3	High-grade squamous intraepithelial lesion (HSIL)	Represents a mix of low- and high-grade lesions not easily differentiated by histology; HSIL+ encompasses HSIL, AGC, and cancer	
CIN 2 (Grade II)		Moderate dysplasia confined to the basal 2/3 of the epithelium; Represents a mix of low- and high-grade lesions not easily differentiated by histology; CIN 2+ encompasses CIN 2, CIN 3, adenocarcinoma in situ (AIS), and cancer	
CIN 3 (Grade III)		Severe dysplasia with undifferentiated neoplastic cells that span more than 2/3 of the epithelium; May involve the full thickness; May also be referred to as cervical carcinoma in situ; CIN 3+ encompasses CIN 3, AIS, and cancer	

Locations of CIN findings can be described in terms of quadrants, or corresponding to a clock face when the subject is in supine position.

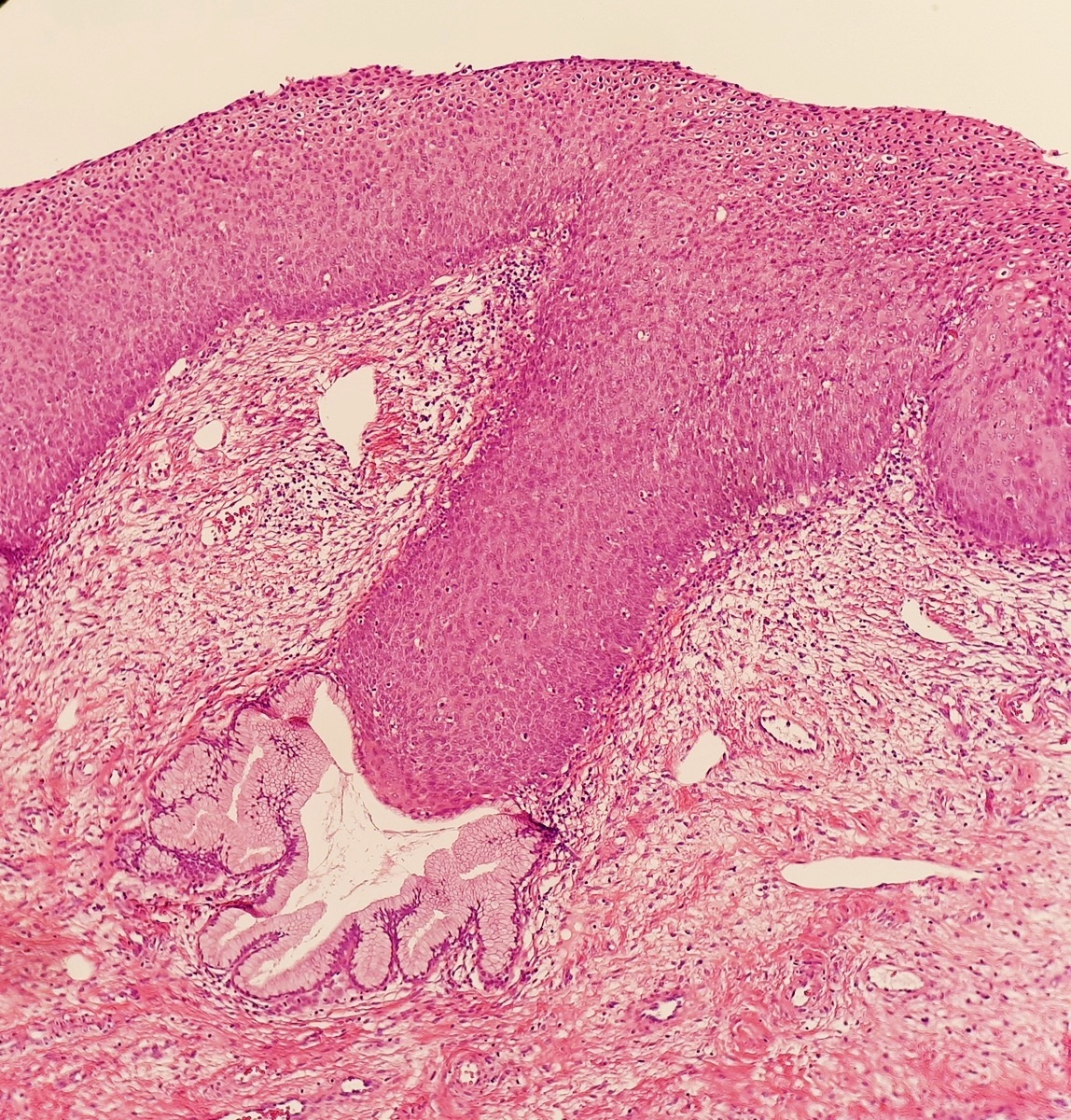
Endocervical gland invasion is associated with high-grade lesions.

=== Changes in terminology ===
The College of American Pathologists and the American Society of Colposcopy and Cervical Pathology came together in 2012 to publish changes in terminology to describe HPV-associated squamous lesions of the anogenital tract as LSIL or HSIL as follows below:

CIN 1 is referred to as LSIL.

CIN 2 that is negative for p16, a marker for high-risk HPV, is referred to as LSIL. Those that are p16-positive are referred to as HSIL.

CIN 3 is referred to as HSIL.

== Screening ==
The two screening methods available are the Pap smear and testing for HPV. CIN is usually discovered by a screening test, the Pap smear. The purpose of this test is to detect potentially precancerous changes through random sampling of the transformation zone. Pap smear results may be reported using the Bethesda system (see above). The sensitivity and specificity of this test were variable in a systematic review looking at the accuracy of the test. An abnormal Pap smear result may lead to a recommendation for colposcopy of the cervix, an in-office procedure during which the cervix is examined under magnification. A biopsy is taken of any abnormal appearing areas.

Colposcopy is usually very painful, and so researchers have tried to find which pain relief is best for women with CIN to use. Research suggests that the injection of a local anaesthetic and vasoconstrictor (medicine that causes blood vessels to narrow) into the cervix may lower blood loss and pain during colposcopy.

HPV testing can identify most of the high-risk HPV types responsible for CIN. HPV screening happens either as a co-test with the Pap smear or can be done after a Pap smear showing abnormal cells, called reflex testing. The frequency of screening changes based on guidelines from the Society of Lower Genital Tract Disorders (ASCCP). The World Health Organization also has screening and treatment guidelines for precancerous cervical lesions and prevention of cervical cancer.

=== Primary prevention ===
HPV vaccination is the approach to primary prevention of both CIN and cervical cancer.

Vaccine	HPV Genotypes Protected Against	Who Gets It?	Number of Doses	Timing Recommendation
Gardasil - quadrivalent	6, 11 (cause genital warts) 16, 18 (cause ≈70% of cervical cancers)	females and males aged 9-26	3	before sexual debut or shortly thereafter
Cervarix - bivalent	16, 18	females age 9-25	3	before sexual debut or shortly thereafter
Gardasil 9 - nonavalent vaccine	6, 11, 16, 18, 31, 33, 45, 52, 58 (cause ≈20% of cervical cancers)	females and males ages 9–26	3	before sexual debut or shortly thereafter

These vaccines do not protect against all types of HPV known to cause cancer. Therefore, screening is still recommended in vaccinated individuals.

=== Secondary prevention ===
Appropriate management with monitoring and treatment is the approach to secondary prevention of cervical cancer in cases of persons with CIN.

== Treatment ==
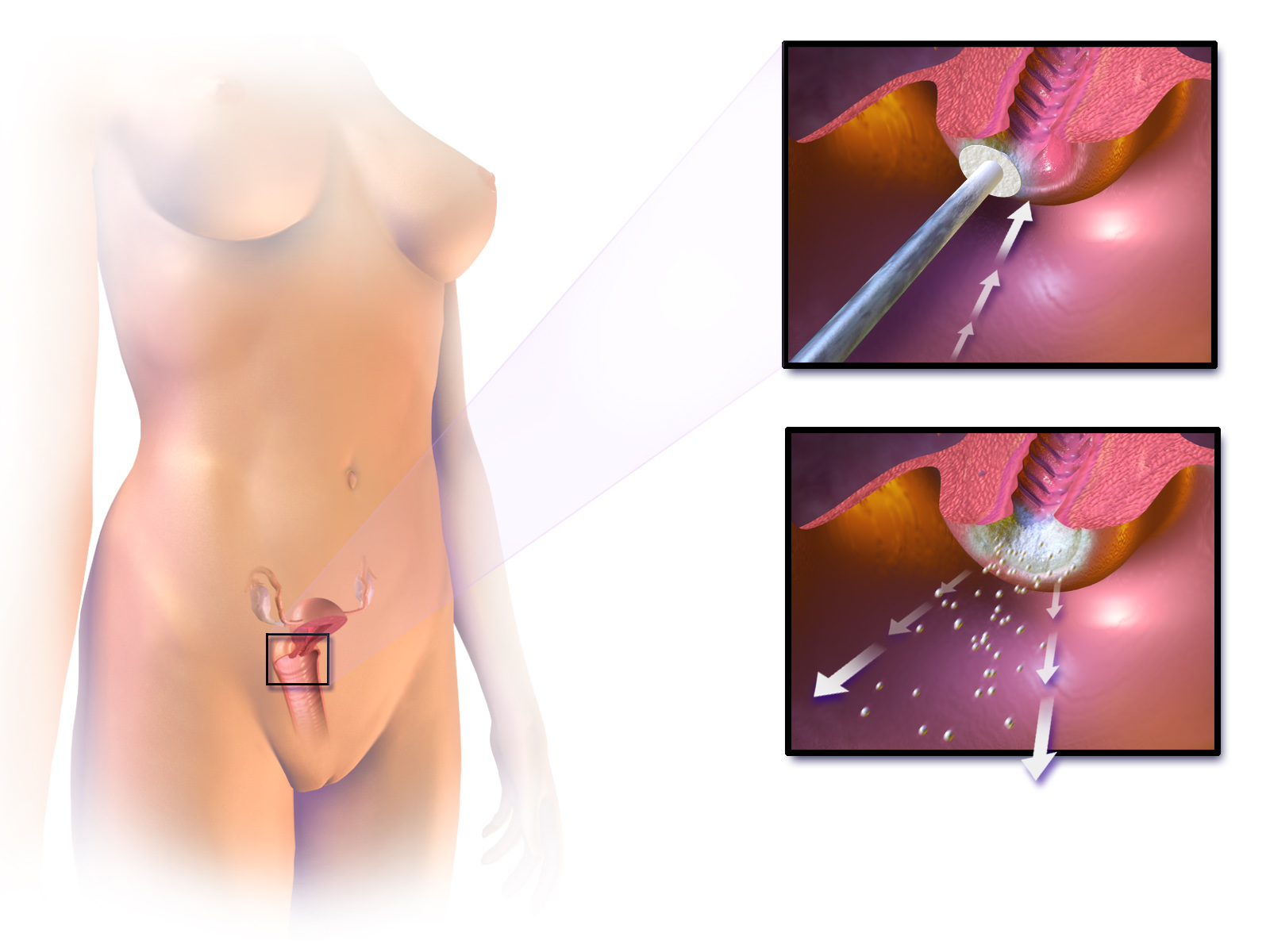
Cervical cryotherapy

Treatment for CIN 1, mild dysplasia, is not recommended if it lasts fewer than two years. Usually, when a biopsy detects CIN 1, the woman has an HPV infection, which may clear on its own within 12 months. Therefore, it is instead followed for later testing rather than being treated. In young women, closely monitoring CIN 2 lesions also appears reasonable.

The typical threshold for treatment is CIN 2+, although a more restrained approach may be taken for young persons and pregnant women. Treatment for higher-grade CIN involves removal or destruction of the abnormal cervical cells by cryocautery, electrocautery, laser cautery, loop electrical excision procedure (LEEP), or cervical conization. While these surgical methods effectively reduce the risk of developing cervical cancer, they cause an increased risk of premature birth in future pregnancies. Surgical techniques that remove more cervical tissue come with less risk of the cancer recurring but a higher chance of giving birth prematurely. Due to this risk, taking into account the age, childbearing plans of the woman, the size and location of the cancer cells are crucial for choosing the right procedure.

While retinoids are not effective in preventing the progression of CIN, they may be effective in causing regression of the disease in people with CIN2. Therapeutic vaccines are currently undergoing clinical trials. The lifetime recurrence rate of CIN is about 20%, but it isn't clear what proportion of these cases are new infections rather than recurrences of the original infection.

Research to investigate if prophylactic antibiotics can help prevent infection in women undergoing excision of the cervical transformation zone found a lack of quality evidence.

People with HIV and CIN 2+ should be initially managed according to the recommendations for the general population, according to the 2012 updated ASCCP consensus guidelines.

== Outcomes ==
It used to be thought that cases of CIN progressed through grades 1–3 toward cancer in a linear fashion.

However, most CINs spontaneously regress. Left untreated, about 70% of CIN 1 will regress within one year; 90% will regress within two years. About 50% of CIN 2 cases will regress within two years without treatment.

Progression to cervical carcinoma in situ (CIS) occurs in approximately 11% of CIN 1 and 22% of CIN 2 cases. Progression to invasive cancer occurs in approximately 1% of CIN 1, 5% of CIN 2, and at least 12% of CIN 3 cases.

Progression to cancer typically takes 15 years, with a range of 3 to 40 years. Also, evidence suggests that cancer can occur without first detectably progressing through CIN grades and that a high-grade intraepithelial neoplasia can occur without first existing as a lower grade.

Research suggests that treatment does not affect the chances of getting pregnant, but it is associated with an increased risk of miscarriage in the second trimester.

Additionally, young women with HSIL are at an increased risk for developing cardiovascular disease including: Myocardial infarction, heart failure, and cerebrovascular disease during follow-up.

== Epidemiology ==
Between 250,000 and 1 million American women are diagnosed with CIN annually. Women can develop CIN at any age but women generally develop it between the ages of 25 and 35. The estimated annual incidence of CIN in the United States among persons who undergo screening is 4% for CIN 1 and 5% for CIN 2 and CIN 3.
