= Dysplasia =

Abnormal development, at macroscopic or microscopical level

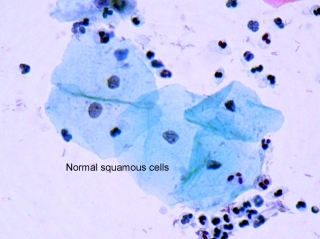
Normal squamous cells

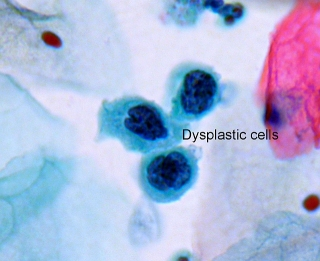
Dysplastic cells

Dysplasia is any of various types of abnormal growth or development of cells (microscopic scale) or organs (macroscopic scale), and the abnormal histology or anatomical structure(s) resulting from such growth. Dysplasias on a mainly microscopic scale include epithelial dysplasia and fibrous dysplasia of bone. Dysplasias on a mainly macroscopic scale include hip dysplasia, myelodysplastic syndrome, and multicystic dysplastic kidney.

In one of the modern histopathological senses of the term, dysplasia is sometimes differentiated from other categories of tissue change including hyperplasia, metaplasia, and neoplasia, and dysplasias are thus generally not cancerous. An exception is that the myelodysplasias include a range of benign, precancerous, and cancerous forms. Various other dysplasias tend to be precancerous. The word's meanings thus cover a spectrum of histopathological variations.

== Microscopic scale ==
=== Epithelial dysplasia ===
Epithelial dysplasia consists of an expansion of immature cells (such as cells of the ectoderm), with a corresponding decrease in the number and location of mature cells. Dysplasia is often indicative of an early neoplastic process. The term dysplasia is typically used when the cellular abnormality is restricted to the originating tissue, as in the case of an early, in-situ neoplasm.

Dysplasia, in which cell maturation and differentiation are delayed, can be contrasted with metaplasia, in which cells of one mature, differentiated type are replaced by cells of another mature, differentiated type.

=== Myelodysplastic syndrome ===
Myelodysplastic syndromes (MDS) are a group of cancers in which immature blood cells in the bone marrow do not mature and therefore do not become healthy blood cells. Problems with blood cell formation result in some combination of low red blood cells, low platelets, and low white blood cells. Some types have an increase in immature blood cells, called blasts, in the bone marrow or blood.

=== Fibrous dysplasia of bone ===
Fibrous dysplasia of bone is a disorder where normal bone and marrow is replaced with fibrous tissue, resulting in formation of bone that is weak and prone to expansion. As a result, most complications result from fracture, deformity, functional impairment and pain.

== Macroscopic scale ==
=== Hip dysplasia ===
Hip dysplasia is an abnormality of the hip joint where the socket portion does not fully cover the ball portion, resulting in an increased risk for joint dislocation. Hip dysplasia may occur at birth or develop in early life. Regardless, it does not typically produce symptoms in babies less than a year old. Occasionally one leg may be shorter than the other. The left hip is more often affected than the right. Complications without treatment can include arthritis, limping, and low back pain.

=== Multicystic dysplastic kidney ===
Multicystic dysplastic kidney (MCDK) is a condition that results from the malformation of the kidney during fetal development. The kidney consists of irregular cysts of varying sizes. Multicystic dysplastic kidney is a common type of renal cystic disease, and it is a cause of an abdominal mass in infants.

== Etymology ==
From Ancient Greek δυσ- dys- 'bad' or 'difficult' and πλάσις plasis 'formation'. The equivalent surface analysis, in parallel with classical compounds, is dys- + -plasia.

== See also ==
- Pleomorphism
- List of biological development disorders
