= Cervical cancer staging =

Cervical cancer
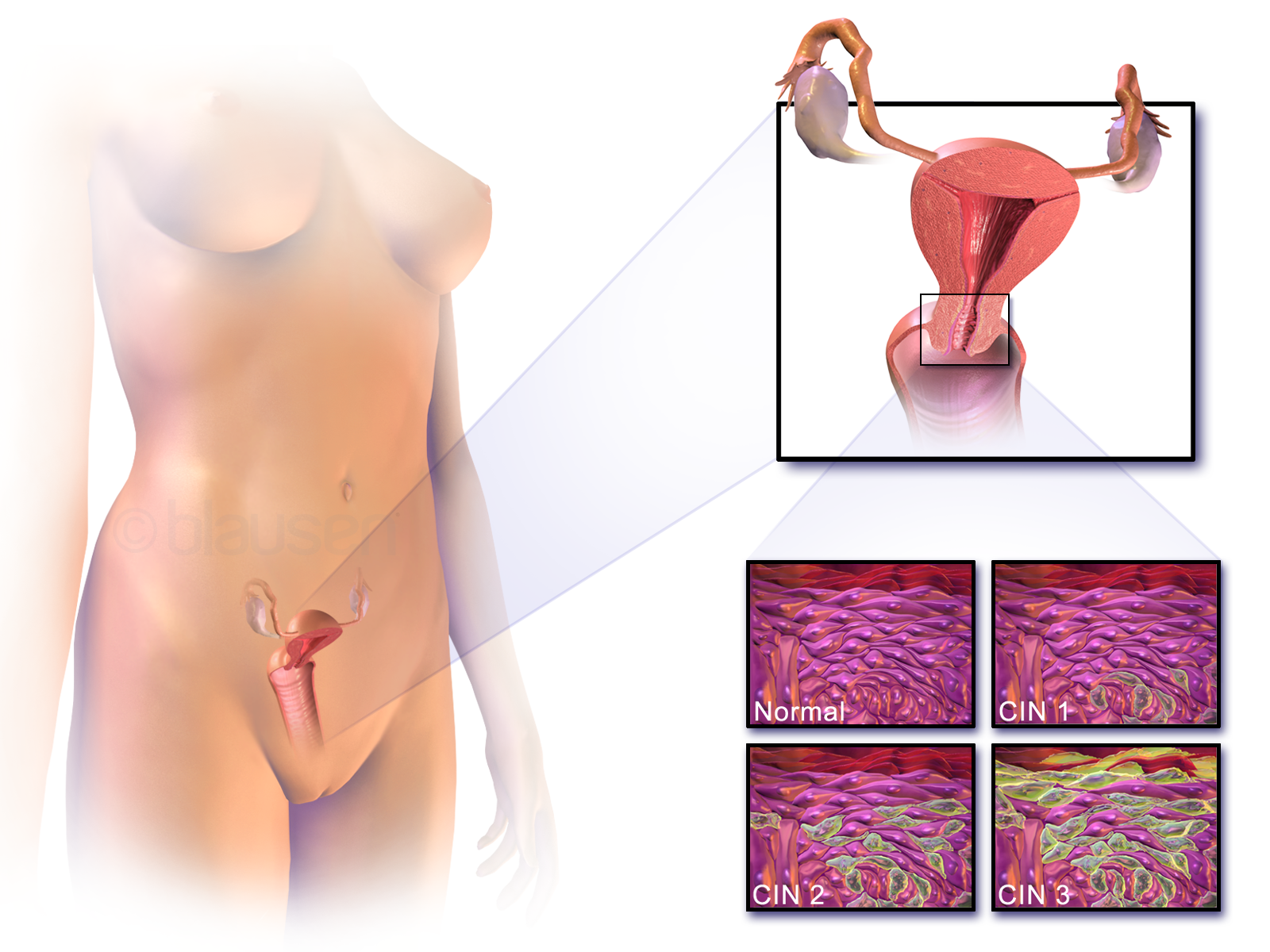
- Location of cervical cancer and an example of normal and abnormal cells
- Pronunciation: UK: /ˈsɜːrvɪkəl/ SUR-vik-əl, /sɜːrˈvaɪkəl/ sur-VY-kəl US: /ˈsɜːrvɪkəl/ SUR-vik-əl
- Specialty: Gynecologic oncology
- Symptoms: Early: none Later: vaginal bleeding, pelvic pain, pain during sexual intercourse
- Usual onset: Over 10 to 20 years
- Types: Squamous cell carcinoma, adenocarcinoma, others
- Causes: Human papillomavirus infection (HPV)
- Risk factors: Smoking, weak immune system, birth control pills, starting sex at a young age, many sexual partners or a partner with many sexual partners
- Diagnostic method: Cervical screening followed by a biopsy
- Prevention: Regular cervical screening, HPV vaccines, sexual intercourse with condoms, sexual abstinence
- Treatment: Surgery, chemotherapy, radiation therapy, immunotherapy
- Prognosis: Five-year survival rate: 68% (US); 46% (India)
- Frequency: 604,127 new cases (2020)
- Deaths: 341,831 (2020)

Cervical cancer staging is the assessment of cervical cancer to determine the extent of the spread of cancer beyond the cervix. This is important for determining how serious the cancer is and to create the best treatment plan.

Cervical cancer is a type of gynecological cancer that begins from cells lining the cervix, the lower part of the uterus. Cervical cancer begins when the cells that line the cervix become abnormal and grow in a pattern that is atypical for non-cancerous cells. Cervical cancer is typically first identified with an abnormal pap smear. The final diagnosis of cervical cancer, including the stage of the cancer, is confirmed with additional testing.

Cancer staging is determined by where the tumor is located, the size of the tumor, and how much the tumor has spread beyond where it originally began, such as to nearby lymph nodes or different parts of the body.

Cancer staging is described on a spectrum from stage 0 to stage IV. Stage 0 describes pre-cancerous or non-invasive types of tumors. Stage IV is used to describe cancers that have spread throughout a significant part of the body. In general, the greater the stage of cancer, the more aggressive the disease and the worse the prognosis.

Cervical cancer staging is described by the International Federation of Gynecology and Obstetrics (FIGO). In 2018, FIGO released the most recent guidelines for cervical cancer staging. These guidelines recommend the use of various physical examinations, types of imaging, and biopsies to determine the stage of cervical cancer.

== Cervical cancer ==
Cervical cancer is the abnormal growth of the cells that line the cervix, resulting in the cells growing out of control and potentially spreading to areas outside of the cervix.

The cervix is the lower part of the uterus. It connects the upper part of the uterus with the vagina. The cervix is divided into two parts based on the types of cells. The outer portion of the cervix is called the ectocervix, while the inner portion of the cervix is the endocervix. These two portions of the cervix have different types of cells. The area where the endocervix and ectocervix meet is known as the transformation zone. Most cervical cancers arise from the cells in the transformation zone.

Cervical cancer screening occurs with pap smears performed by an obstetrician-gynecologist. During a pap smear, doctors collect a sample of the cells from the cervix to look at under a microscope to examine for any abnormalities or signs of pre-cancerous changes. While many abnormalities on pap smears are not indicative of cervical cancer, the doctor may recommend additional testing to gain a better understanding of the cervical cells. Additional testing that may be performed includes an endocervical curettage, colposcopy, or cervical conization. Each of these procedures allows for the collection of a biopsy of the cells of the cervix.

== Pattern of progression ==
Abnormalities of cervical cells, or dysplasia, develop over time and along a continuum. There are several types of abnormalities of cervical cells known as pre-cancerous changes. These pre-cancerous changes are known as cervical intraepithelial neoplasm (CIN) and squamous intraepithelial lesion (SIL), based on whether the results are from a biopsy or a pap smear. CIN and SIL are graded from 1 to 3 based on the degree of change observed. CIN 1, 2, and 3 all represent pre-cancerous findings.

- CIN 1, also known as low-grade SIL, is the most benign finding. This represents very few atypical cells found, and generally, these cells will revert to normal.
- CIN 2 and 3, also known as high-grade SIL, indicate that more tissue looks abnormal. These changes represent a higher likelihood of progression to cancer. These findings are often closely watched or may be removed to prevent the progression of cancer.

The main types of cervical cancer include squamous cell carcinomas and adenocarcinomas. Nearly 90% of cervical cancers are squamous cell carcinomas. Cervical cancers may also be a mix between squamous cell carcinomas and adenocarcinomas, known as adenosquamous carcinoma.

Cervical cancer spreads directly from the cervix into surrounding organs and via the lymphatic system. When spreading via the lymphatic system, cervical cancer will spread to nearby lymph nodes, including the obturator, external iliac, and internal iliac lymph nodes. Nearby structures that cervical cancer may spread to directly include the peritoneum, vagina, uterus, bladder, and rectum. If cervical cancer has spread to distant organs, such as the liver, lungs, or skeleton, this represents a late finding and significant disease. The degree of spread of cancer to areas beyond the cervix is important in determining the stage of cervical cancer.

== Overview of staging ==
Staging is the process of determining the type of cervical cancer and the extent the cancer has spread beyond the cervix to local or distant parts of the body. To determine the stage of the cancer, various modalities may be used including physical examination, biopsies, pathological examinations, and imaging, including MRI, ultrasound, CT, and PET scans. The information gathered from all of these modalities is put together to determine the cancer stage. FIGO guidelines recommend assigning a lower stage whenever possible. The cervical cancer stage assigned at initial diagnosis cannot be altered later, regardless of recurrence or later disease spread.

== Staging modalities ==
=== Biopsy ===
A biopsy, or sample of the tissue, is the first step in determining the type and extent of cancer. This biopsy may be obtained through a punch biopsy, LEEP (loop electrosurgical excision procedure), or cone biopsy. These procedures allow the doctor to obtain a sample of the cancerous tissue to look at under a microscope. By examining the size of the cancer, the margins of the biopsy sample, and the type of abnormal cells, the type of cancer can be determined.

Biopsy of nearby lymph nodes may also be necessary to determine if the cervical cancer has spread lymphatically. This may be done via fine-needle aspiration, minimally invasive surgery, or laparotomy (open incision of the abdomen). Typically, these procedures are not done until after there is confirmation of cervical cancer and after imaging is performed, if possible.

=== Pathology ===
Following the collection of biopsies of the cervical cancer and areas where it may have spread, the cells of the cancer will be looked at under a microscope. This is vital in determining the stage of the cancer. There are several different ways that pathologists may classify the cancer. All cancers of the cervix must be confirmed under a microscope and are determined to be cervical in origin if the primary source of the cancer is the cervix.

==== Histopathologic staging ====
The histopathologic stage describes the type of cells seen under the microscope. There are 10 histopathologic types of cervical cancers:

- Squamous cell carcinoma (with modifiers including keratinizing; non-keratinizing; papillary, basaloid, warty, verrucous, squamotransitional, lymphoepithelioma-like)
- Adenocarcinoma (with modifiers including endocervical; mucinous, villoglandular, endometrioid)
- Clear cell adenocarcinoma
- Serous carcinoma
- Adenosquamous carcinoma
- Glassy cell carcinoma
- Adenoid cystic carcinoma
- Adenoid basal carcinoma
- Small cell carcinoma
- Undifferentiated carcinoma

==== Histopathologic grading ====
The grade of the cancer is another method to describe the appearance of the tumor cells under a microscope. This describes how different the cells look from typical cells of the cervix. It may also indicate the speed at which the cancer cells grow. The grades are described below, with grade 3 being the most aggressive.

- GX: Grade cannot be assessed
- G1: Well differentiated
- G2: Moderately differentiated
- G3: Poorly or undifferentiated

=== Imaging ===
Imaging modalities, including ultrasound, MRI, CT, and positron emission tomography (PET), may be beneficial in helping to determine the stage of the disease, where resources permit. These imaging modalities allow for the visualization of the tumor size, degree of spread of the cancer to lymph nodes and surrounding organs, and to evaluate for distant metastasis.

For primary tumors over 10mm in size, MRI is the best imaging modality to evaluate the primary tumor. PET-CT scans are the imaging modality of choice to evaluate for lymph node metastasis. Ultrasound may also be a beneficial method of evaluating the extent of cancer spread when performed by an experienced sonographer.

Overall, imaging has the benefit of providing greater information on cancer, including the size of the tumor and its spread beyond the cervix. This information is critical in determining the stage of the cancer and building the best treatment plan.

=== Additional modalities ===
If there is evidence that the cervical cancer has spread to local or distant organs, such as the bladder, rectum, or lungs, additional imaging or procedures may be necessary to determine the extent of cancer spread. This may include a chest X-ray to evaluate for lung metastasis, a cystoscopy (camera in the bladder) to look for bladder metastasis, a renal ultrasound to evaluate for the tumor blocking the ureter (tubes connecting the kidney to the bladder), and a sigmoidoscopy (camera in the rectum) to evaluate for cancer that has spread to the colon. The performance of these procedures and imaging modalities is highly individualized based on the symptoms the patient has and the evidence of disease progression.

== Stages ==
Following the collection and interpretation of all imaging and pathology reports, the stage of cervical cancer is determined. Stages of cervical cancer range from stage I to stage IV, with stage 1 indicating local cancerous cells at the cervix, to stage IV indicating advanced disease and the spread of cancer cells to distant parts of the body. Stage 0 represents the presence of precancerous cells, but does not represent a cervical cancer diagnosis. Controversially, the presence of the spread of cervical cancer to nearby lymph nodes does not change the stage of the diagnosis but is important to note as it may alter the treatment plan. Additionally, the involvement of the body of the uterus does not factor into the stage of cervical cancer.

=== Stage 0 ===
The precancerous cells are confined to the surface layer (cells lining) of the cervix. This is also known as carcinoma in situ (CIS).

=== Stage I ===
Cervical cancer is confined only to the cervix. The size of the cancer may include the corpus or fundus (upper portion of the uterus), but there is no cancer growth beyond the cervix or the uterus. Stage I is subdivided based on the depth of the cancer as follows:

- IA: The cervical cancer is diagnosed based on a biopsy specimen, which demonstrates that the deepest invasion of the cervical cancer is less than 5mm. Stage 1A cervical cancer can originate from either squamous or glandular epithelium. On biopsy, the margins of the specimen do not have any evidence of cervical cancer.
  - IA1: Greatest depth of cancer invasion on biopsy < 3 mm
  - IA2: Greatest depth of cancer invasion on biopsy ≥ 3 mm and < 5 mm
- IB: The cervical cancer is diagnosed based on a biopsy specimen that demonstrates a depth of invasion of the cancer over 5 mm. Often, these cancers are clinically visible, which differentiates IB from IA.
  - IB1: Greatest depth of cancer invasion on biopsy ≥ 5 mm and < 2 cm
  - IB2: Greatest depth of cancer invasion on biopsy ≥ 2 cm and < 4 cm
  - IB3: Greatest depth of cancer invasion on biopsy ≥ 4 cm

Stage IA cervical cancer

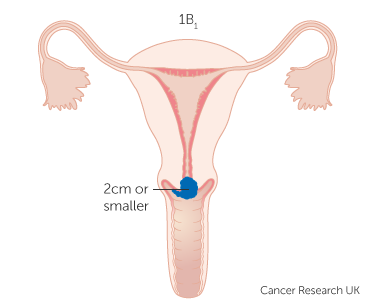
Stage IB1 cervical cancer

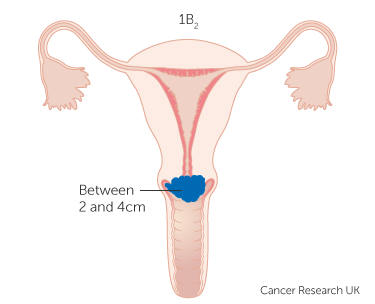
Stage IB2 cervical cancer

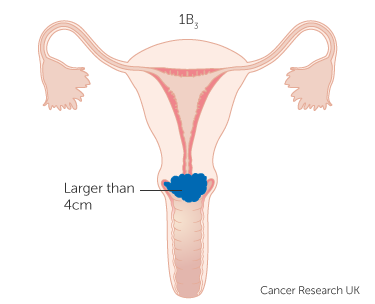
Stage IB3 cervical cancer

=== Stage II ===
Cervical cancer invades beyond the uterus, but does not extend to the pelvic wall or the lower third of the vagina.

- IIA: The cancer has spread to the upper two-thirds of the vagina, but does not involve the parametrium (the fat and connective tissue surrounding the uterus)
  - IIA1: The largest dimension of the tumor is < 4 cm
  - IIA2: The largest dimension of the tumor ≥ 4 cm
- IIB: The cancer has spread to the parametrium but does not involve the pelvic wall (the muscles and ligaments that support the pelvis).

Stage IIA cervical cancer

Stage IIB cervical cancer

=== Stage III ===
Cervical cancer has spread to involve any or all of the following: lower third of the vagina, pelvic wall, pelvic or para-aortic lymph nodes (more distant lymph nodes), is causing hydronephrosis (blockage of the kidney), and/or is causing a non-functioning kidney.

- IIIA: The cancer involves the lower third of the vagina, but does not extend to the pelvic wall.
- IIIB: Cancer has spread to the pelvic wall and/or has resulted in hydronephrosis or a non-functioning kidney.
- IIIC: Cancer has spread to involve pelvic and/or para-aortic lymph nodes. Tumor size is not a factor in determining the stage if there is cancer spread to distant lymph nodes.
  - IIIC1: Cancer has spread to involve only the pelvic lymph nodes.
  - IIIC2: Cancer has spread to involve the para-aortic lymph nodes.

Cervical cancer stage IIIA

Cervical cancer stage IIIB

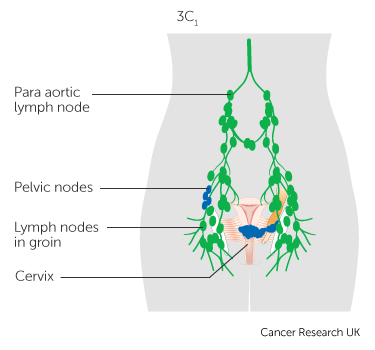
Cervical cancer stage IIIC1

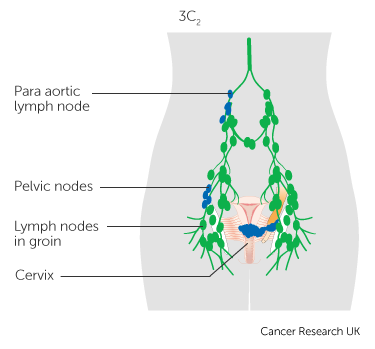
Cervical cancer stage IIIC2

=== Stage IV ===
The cancer has spread beyond the true pelvis (the internal reproductive organs, bladder, and colon) or has involved the mucosa of the bladder or rectum. Spread to the bladder or rectum must be biopsy-proven.

- IVA: Cancer has spread to the adjacent organs (ex. bladder, rectum)
- IVB: Cancer has spread to distant organs (ex. lungs, liver)

Stage IVA cervical cancer

Stage IVB cervical cancer

== History of cervical cancer staging ==
The drive to develop a staging for gynecological malignancies, including cancer of the cervix, was the need to have a uniform method to describe the extent of the disease. Comparing outcomes from different treatments could only be possible if the comparison were made for groups of patients with a similar degree of disease burden.

=== Major Historical Timepoints ===
1929 - League of Nations Classification for Cervical Cancer

1937 - First annual report of statistics on radiotherapy outcomes in cervical cancer patients

1938 - Atlas of Cervical Cancer Staging (Heyman and Strandquist)

1950 - The International Classification of the Stages of Carcinoma of the Uterine Cervix

1954 - Founding of FIGO

1958 - FIGO becomes the official publisher of the Annual Report

1973 - Commencement of triennial publication of the Annual Report on the Results of Treatment in Gynecological Cancer

1976 - The American Joint Committee on Cancer accepts the FIGO stage grouping for gynecological cancers

2018 - Latest triennial FIGO Cancer Report

The most recent updates to cervical cancer staging included in the 2018 edition marked a departure from a system based mainly on clinical evaluation to one that allows imaging and pathological methods to help determine tumor size and extent of disease to assign the stage. A major topic of debate was the impact that newer diagnostic modalities would have on low- and middle-income countries, which bear most of the disease burden. The final recommendations make findings from imaging and pathology optional for staging rather than a requirement.
