= Villoglandular adenocarcinoma of the cervix =

- Other names: Villoglandular papillary adenocarcinoma, papillary villoglandular adenocarcinoma, well-differentiated villoglandular adenocarcinoma (VGA)
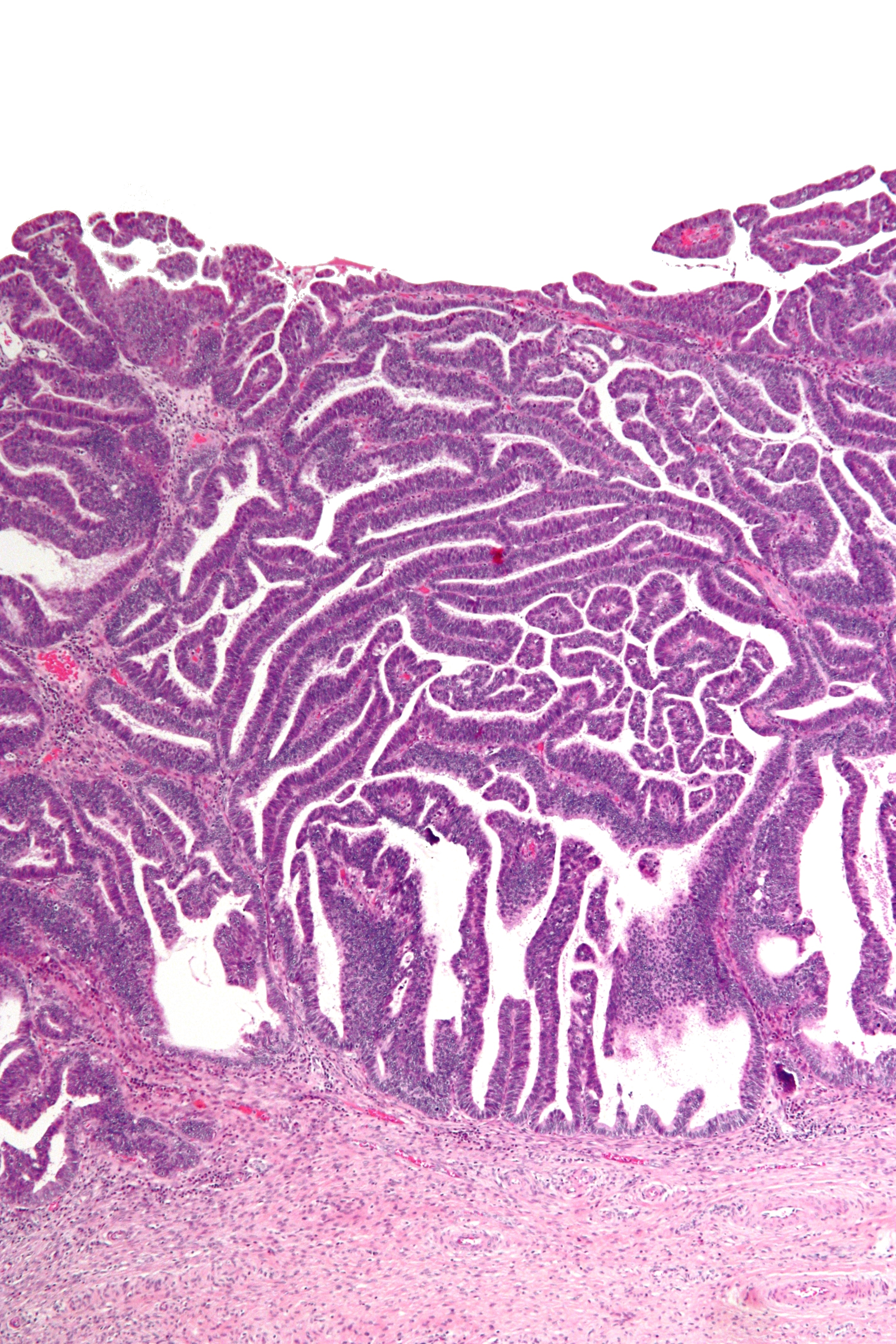
- Micrograph of a villoglandular adenocarcinoma the cervix. H&E stain.
- Specialty: Pathology, gynecology

Villoglandular adenocarcinoma of the cervix is a rare type of cervical cancer that, in relation to other cervical cancers, is typically found in younger women and has a better prognosis.

A similar lesion, villoglandular adenocarcinoma of the endometrium, may arise from the inner lining of the uterus, the endometrium.

== Signs and symptoms ==
The signs and symptoms are similar to other cervical cancers and may include post-coital bleeding and/or pain during intercourse (dyspareunia). Early lesions may be completely asymptomatic.

== Diagnosis ==
The diagnosis is based on tissue examination, e.g. biopsy.

The name of the lesion describes it microscopic appearance. It has nipple-like structures with fibrovascular cores (papillae) that are long in relation to their width (villus-like), which are covered with a glandular pseudostratified columnar epithelium.

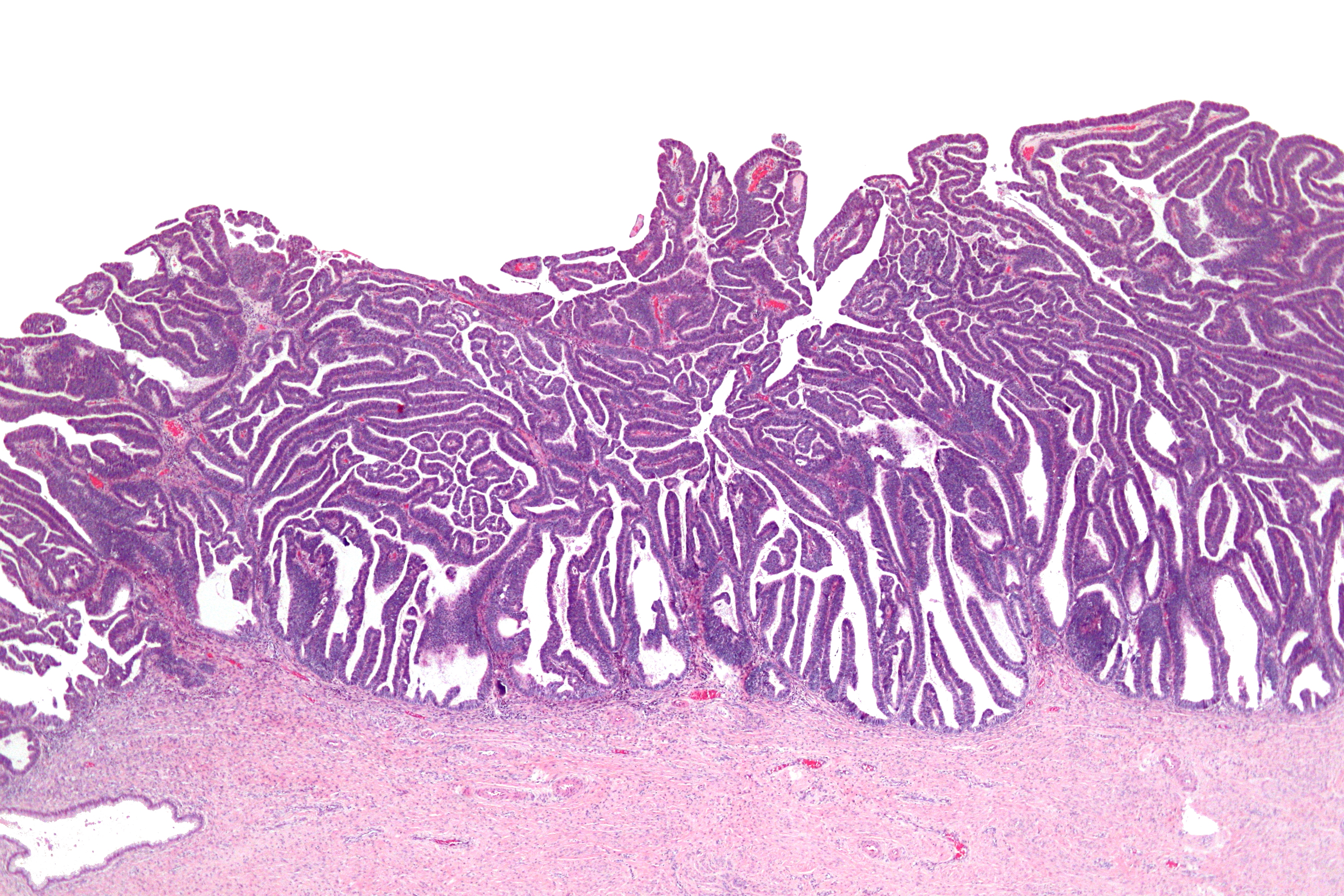
Very low magnification

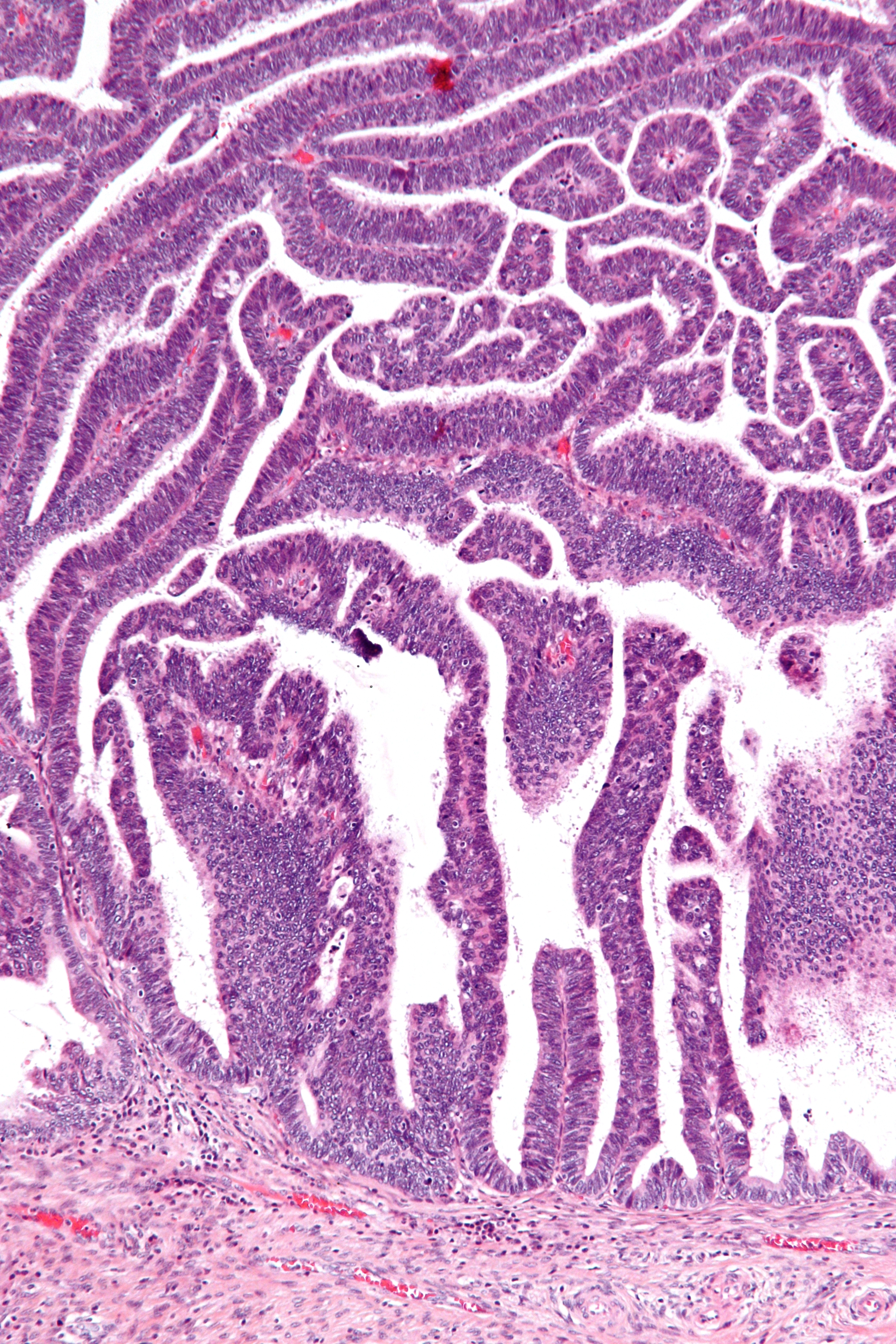
Intermediate magnification

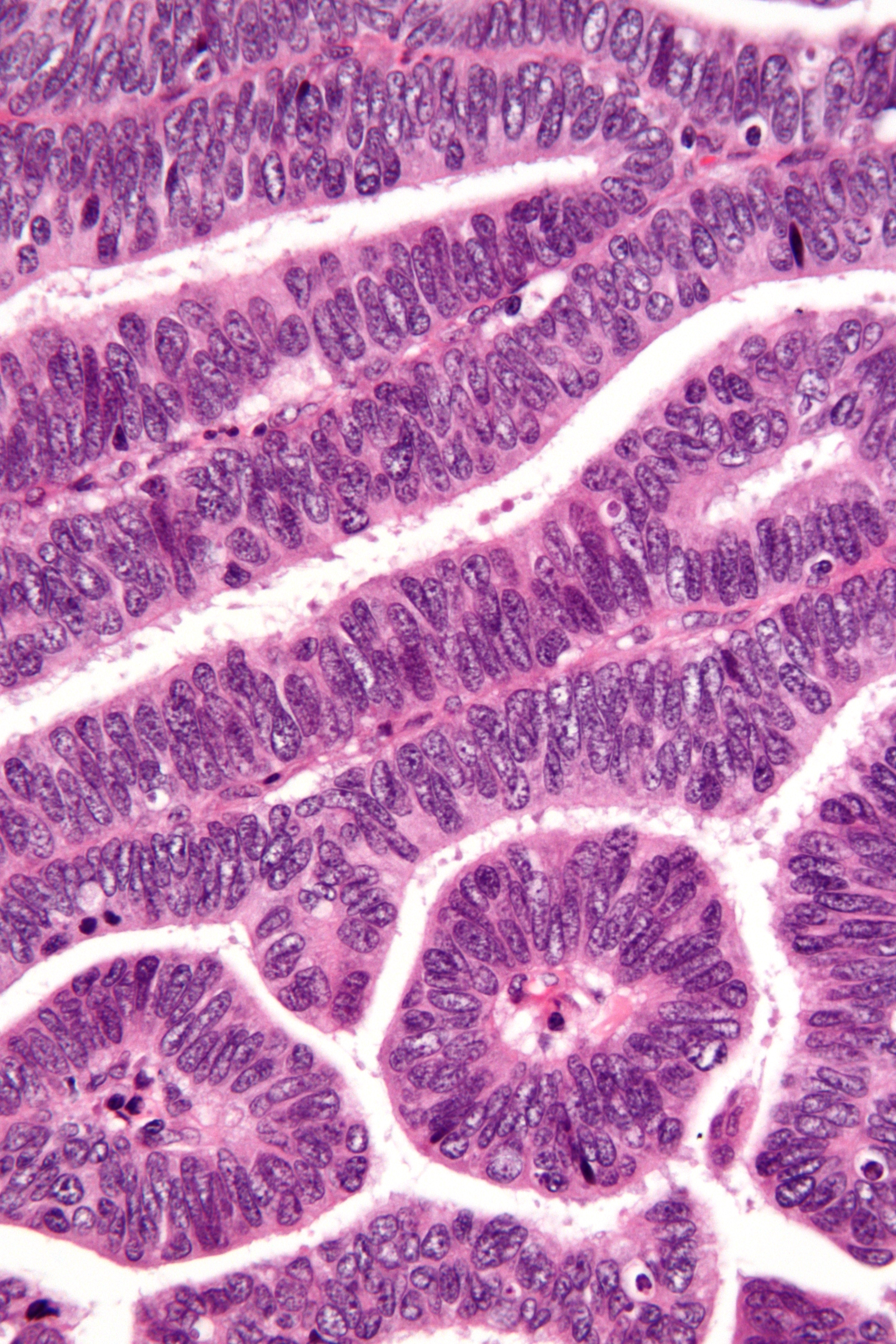
Very high magnification

== Treatment ==
The treatment is dependent on the stage. As the prognosis of this tumour is usually good, fertility sparing approaches (conization, cervicectomy) may be viable treatment options.

== See also ==
- Endometrial cancer
- Glassy cell carcinoma
- Villous adenoma
