= Dargent =

Dargent is a surname of French origin. Notable people with the surname include:

- Mireille Dargent (born 1951), French actress
- Yan' Dargent (1824–1899), French painter and illustrator

== See also ==
- Trachelectomy, also known as the Dargent operation, the surgical removal of the uterine cervix
