= Dyskaryosis =

Medical condition

Dyskaryosis (dis-kār-ĭ-ó-sis) is abnormal cytologic changes of squamous epithelial cells characterized by hyperchromatic nuclei and/or irregular nuclear chromatin. This may be followed by the development of a malignant neoplasm. Dyskaryosis is used synonymously with dysplasia, which is the more common term.

"Dyskaryosis" is a term used for all squamous mucosal surfaces and commonly used for the uterine cervix condition in which some of the epithelial cells near the external orifice show abnormalities in their cellular nuclei.

These changes are often quite subtle and are often perceived as temporary, occurring between the ages of fifteen and twenty-five. Apparent dyskaryosis below the age of twenty-five is not regarded as significant, and in many countries where cervical screening programmes exist, the age of entry into the programme is around 25 years old. The programme often terminates around the age of 65, assuming no abnormal smears were found previously over ten years.

Cervical dyskaryosis is classified into three degrees of severity: mild dyskaryosis, moderate, and severe. A further category is used to define cells that do not show significant nuclear abnormality, and may not be described as 'dyskaryotic.' This category is termed [epithelial] cellular "borderline changes". As dyskaryotic epithelium found in the cervix has malignant potential, most cases of dyskaryosis will typically be followed up and referred. The risk is increasingly high with higher grades of dyskaryosis. Most borderline changes will resolve spontaneously, as will many mild ones. Moderate and severe changes are usually treated by electrocautery, cryocautery, or loop excision to remove the abnormal area completely.

Dyskaryosis can be caused by infection with human papilloma virus (HPV), which exists in several different strains; type 16 and type 18 cause dyskaryosis more frequently and readily than do other types. These viruses are nearly always sexually transmitted. Immunization, which is now available against HPV 16 and 18, will prevent further infection by these strains. But if infection has occurred before immunization, and cellular change has already occurred, the vaccine does not reduce the risk of developing dyskaryotic change.

Dyskaryosis means abnormal nucleus and refers to the abnormal epithelial cell, which may be found in a cervical sample. It is graded from low to high grade based on the degree of abnormality. All of these changes are treatable with no recurrence.

== See also ==
- Cervical intraepithelial neoplasia
