= Clear-cell adenocarcinoma =

Type of adenocarcinoma that shows clear cells

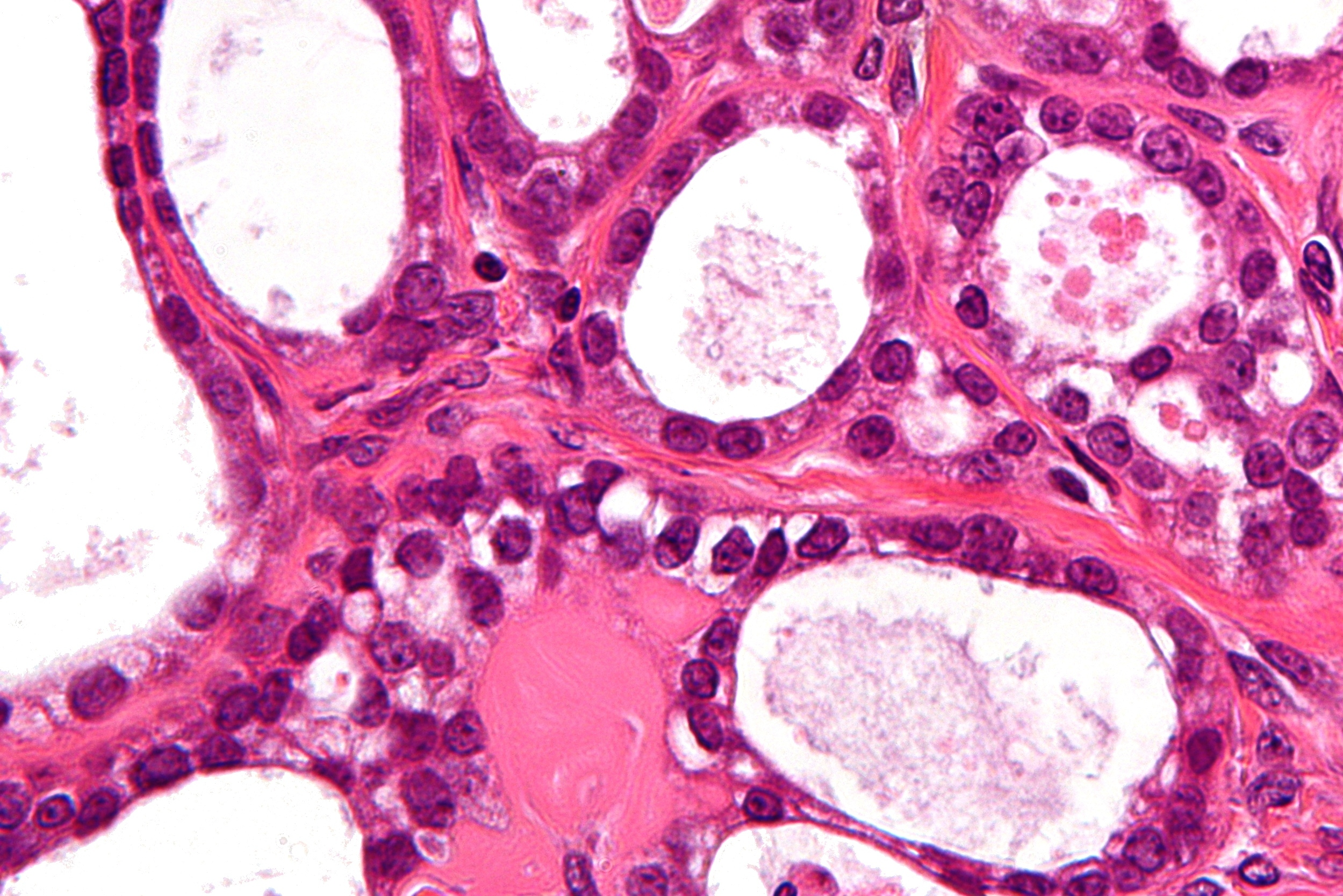
- Micrograph of an ovarian clear-cell adenocarcinoma. H&E stain
- Specialty: Oncology

Clear-cell adenocarcinoma is a rare and aggressive form of cancer that typically arises in the female reproductive organs, particularly the ovaries and the endometrium as well as the kidneys and is characterized by the presence of clear, glycogen-rich cells. Specific criteria must be met for a tumor to be classified as clear cell adenocarcinoma. According to the WHO, these criteria include polygonal or hobnail or cells with clear or eosinophilic/oxyphilic cytoplasm and nuclear atypia, with different architectural patterns of growth, such as papillary, tubulocystic, or solid.

== Types ==
=== Cervical ===
Cervical adenocarcinoma is less likely to be caused by high-risk HPV strains than cervical squamous cell carcinoma is: around 10-15% of cervical adenocarcinomas are non-HPV-related. Cervical clear cell carcinoma (CCC) is typically HPV-negative, though many are p16 positive. Traditionally, clear cell carcinoma of the lower genital tract in females was related to diethylstilbestrol (DES) exposure in utero. More recently, these cases develop sporadically or are related to vaginal adenosis. Risk factors are similar to other types of cervical cancer, including immunosuppression, smoking, long-term oral contraceptive use, increased number of sexual partners, early onset of sexual activity, hormone replacement therapy, and obesity.

As with other types of cervical cancer, cervical CCC is diagnosed with a cervical biopsy. Further treatment is managed similarly to other types of cervical cancer, such as performing an excision procedure in the form of a cold knife conization or a loop electrosurgical excision procedure (LEEP). Further surgical management depends upon the depth of tumor invasion. Invasive tumors may require chemotherapy and radiation treatment. Cervical CCC appears to have a similar prognosis to other types of cervical cancer.

=== Ovarian ===
Ovarian clear cell carcinoma is a subtype of epithelial ovarian carcinoma. These tumors are typically unilateral. They are associated with endometriosis, in which endometrial tissue grows outside the uterine cavity. Benign endometriotic cysts, also known as adenofibromas, are frequently the source of these tumor cells.

Treatment of ovarian clear cell carcinoma typically begins with surgery to remove the ovaries and other affected organs. Chemotherapeutic treatment of gynecological cancers typically includes a platinum-based therapy and a taxane. Clear cell ovarian tumors have a higher rate of resistance to these medications. Other treatment routes, including immunologic agents against certain biomarkers, are being explored.

=== Uterine ===
Uterine clear cell carcinoma is a rare, aggressive form of endometrial cancer. This is an example of a Type II endometrial carcinoma, meaning that it is unrelated to endometrial hyperplasia. Uterine clear cell tumors arise from an endometrium that has become thin and dry. Patients usually present with abnormal uterine bleeding.

Treatment of uterine clear cell carcinoma is primarily surgical. A tumor debulking procedure is typically performed, consisting of a total hysterectomy and bilateral salpingo-oopherectomy. Depending on the level of tumor invasion, an omentectomy and other malignancy removal may be performed at the same time. Cytoreductive surgery, which involves removing all visible cancer cells during the operation, is the current standard of care. Minimally invasive surgical techniques are preferred over open surgeries, as patients tend to have better short-term outcomes after the surgery.

Patients may be treated with chemotherapy or radiation following tumor debulking. Platinum-based chemotherapy is the mainstay for most gynecologic cancers, including endometrial cancers. Depending on the genomic subtype of the tumor, various other chemotherapeutic or immunologic therapies may be employed.

=== Vaginal ===
Clear cell adenocarcinoma of the vagina is a rare cancer that is related to DES exposure in utero. DES was a drug previously given to some women with high-risk pregnancies to prevent miscarriage. Women who were exposed to DES in utero should be evaluated yearly with a pap smear and pelvic exam due to risk of developing clear cell adenocarcinoma.

Vaginal clear cell carcinoma frequently presents with abnormal uterine bleeding. As with other gynecological cancers, treatment varies with the stage of the cancer. Lower grade tumors can be treated with surgical resection, while higher grade tumors may need chemotherapy and radiation.

== See also ==
- Clear-cell sarcoma – Rare form of cancer
