= Smit sleeve =

Medical device

A Smit sleeve is a disposable indwelling intrauterine tube placed into the cervical internal os to allow easier surgical anatomic localization in cervical cancer. The device is constructed from medical grade polymers and has wing extensions to help it maintain in position to help identify landmarks for future therapy. It can then be imaged by CT or MRI so that targeted brachytherapy can be tailored to the lesion as the malignancy evolves.
