= Endocervical curettage =

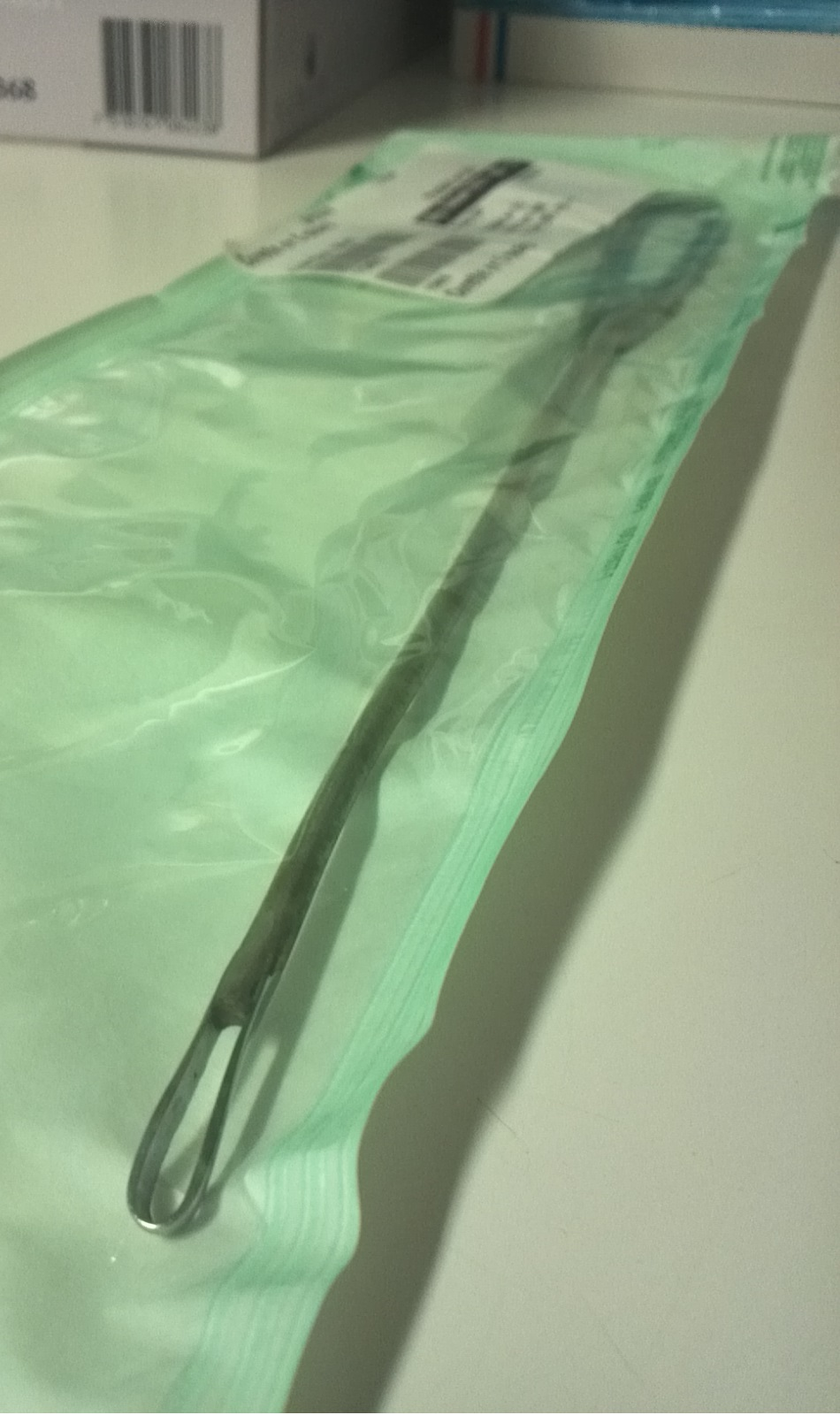
- Curette used for endocervical curettage
- Purpose: Used to biopsy endocervical canal for abnormalities

Endocervical curettage is a procedure in which the mucous membrane of the cervical canal is scraped using a spoon-shaped instrument called a curette. The procedure is used to test for abnormal, precancerous conditions, or cervical cancer. The procedure is generally performed after an abnormal pap smear to further assess the tissue. Other common indications to perform endocervical curettage include evaluation of persistent human papillomavirus infection infections, workup of unexplained abnormal uterine bleeding, and follow up of inconclusive colposcopy.

== History ==
Colposcopy was first performed by physician Hans Hinselmann, a German gynecologist, in 1925. He utilized a bright light and low-power microscope to directly visualize atypical cervical cells. However, the first use of endocervical curettage is not clearly delineated in the medical literature. The use of curettage as a method to extract biological tissue dates back to the 19th century. Dr. Ernst Wertheim, an Austrian gynecologist, who pioneered many surgical interventions and techniques in gynecology may have been the first to implement endocervical curettage in its earliest forms.

Use of endocervical curettage became widespread by the mid-20th century as understanding and methods of cervical pathology rapidly advanced. Over the decades endocervical curettage and its inclusion in guidelines have been the subject of debate by medical societies, with some arguing its diagnostic use is limited. However, endocervical curettage has retained its value as a less invasive method to biopsy the endocervical canal.

== Medical uses ==
Endocervical curettage is a medical procedure used to extract cells of the endocervix to visualize under a microscope. Direct cervical visualization, colposcopy, and even endocervical colposcopy are not enough to fully analyze all areas of the endocervical epithelium and thus endocervical curettage is the method of choice in cases where this is necessary.

=== Indications ===
Generally the next step in workup of an abnormal pap smear includes a colposcopy which involves the direct visualization of the cervix. However, the cervical epithelium of the endocervix cannot be visualized and endocervical curettage may be used to biopsy the endocervix epithelium. Endocervical curettage is particularly useful in cases of colposcopy where the squamocolumnar junction is not visualized.

The indications to perform endocervical curettage vary by medical society recommendations but some commonly accepted indications include:

1. Abnormal pap smear with negative findings on colposcopy
2. Pap smear cytology of atypical glandular cells, high-grade squamous intraepithelial lesions, or carcinoma
3. Colposcopy findings concerning for endocervical lesion or squamocolumnar junction not visualized
4. Patient undergoing colposcopy after testing positive for human papillomavirus infection 16 or 18

=== Efficacy ===
The efficacy of endocervical curettage has long been debated with discussions around its value dating back to when its use first became widespread back in the mid-20th century. Numerous studies and meta-analyses have been performed over the centuries to assess the diagnostic value of endocervical curettage in the workup of cervical dysplasia and to determine its sensitivity and specificity. Most recent studies retain its value in the diagnostic workup as an intermediate step between pap smear and cone biopsy. It also maintains value as a less invasive method to analyze the endocervical canal.

== Procedure ==
Speculum

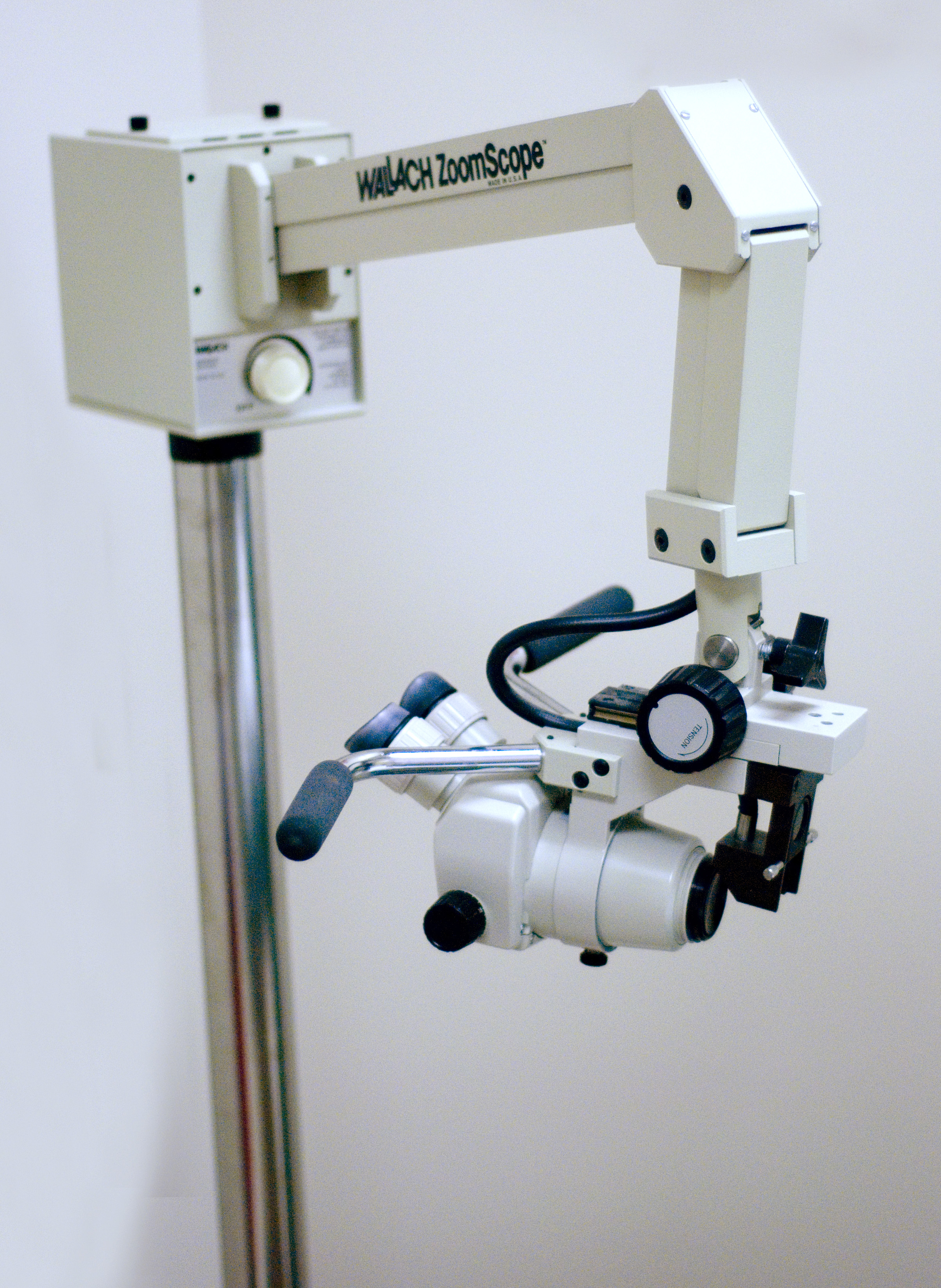
Colposcope

Endocervical curettage is a type of cervical biopsy that is performed with a curette to scrape cells from endocervical canal. The procedure is generally performed in the outpatient setting and begins with the patient laying flat on their back with feet usually in stirrups. This is the position for most pelvic exams.

The provider will first use a speculum, which is inserted in the vaginal canal, for visualization of the cervix. Anesthetics should be used to ensure that the patient is comfortable during the procedure. A colposcope, a magnifying tool, is used to directly visualize the cervical, vaginal, or vulvar tissue under a low-powered microscope. Once the entire cervix is visualized, an acetic acid solution or lugol's iodine solution may be applied to the cervical canal to identify abnormal lesions. Forceps can be used during the procedure to grasp the cervix. Once these steps of the colposcopy are completed, the provider will proceed with endocervical curettage if the findings indicate that biopsy of the endocervical canal is necessary.

Endocervical curettage is generally the last step of the colposcopy procedure. It is when the curette is inserted and passed through the cervical os, the opening in the cervix that leads into the uterus, and used to scrape cells from the inside of the cervical canal. The curette is firmly held like a pen, and should scrape the endocervical canal in small strokes. The curette should be carefully removed from the canal once the entire area is sampled so the sample is not lost. These biopsied cells should be immediately placed into formalin to ensure their preservation. They are then later viewed under a microscope by a pathologist to assess for any abnormalities.

== Risks ==
Guidelines reveal good evidence that endocervical curettage is contraindicated in pregnancy. There is a risk of damage to fetal membranes or placenta along with an increased risk of cervical perforation due to the softening of the cervix during pregnancy. For these reasons, pregnancy is a well established contraindication to performing endocervical curettage. Other relative contraindications to the procedure include severe cervical stenosis and acute uterine or cervical infections.

Rare risks of the procedure include cervical perforation though the incidence of perforation is extremely low. Other risks for the procedure include bleeding, infection, and pain. Though sterilization techniques, anesthetics, and hemostasis tools greatly mitigate these risks and the procedure is generally very tolerated aside from discomfort.

== Results and follow up ==
After endocervical curettage, cells are viewed under a high-powered microscope by a pathologist. The pathologist analyzes the cells for any atypical features such as hyperplasia, dysplasia, or neoplasm. Features that are analyzed include nuclear size, evidence of pleomorphism, anisokaryosis, hyperchromasia, and mitotic features.

Grades for cervical dysplasia include low-grade squamous intraepithelial lesion to high-grade squamous intraepithelial lesion. The dysplasia can be rated on the Bethesda System of cervical grades of increasing atypical nature summarized below:

1. Atypical squamous cell
2. Low-grade squamous intraepithelial lesion – cervical intraepithelial neoplasia 1
3. High-grade squamous intraepithelial lesion – cervical intraepithelial neoplasia 2/3
4. Invasive features
5. Squamous cell carcinoma

Ratings of cervical intraepithelial neoplasia are also commonly used to grade cytology of cervical epithelium. Cervical intraepithelial neoplasia 1 is the most moderate and are low-grade squamous intraepithelial lesions while cervical intraepithelial neoplasia 2 and 3 are moderate to severe and are high-grade squamous intraepithelial lesions.
