= Trachelectomy =

Surgical removal of the uterine cervix

- Diagram showing the parts removed with a trachelectomy
- ICD-9-CM: 67.4

In gynecologic oncology, trachelectomy, also called cervicectomy, is a surgical removal of the uterine cervix. As the uterine body is preserved, this type of surgery is a fertility preserving surgical alternative to a radical hysterectomy and applicable in selected younger women with early cervical cancer.

== Types ==
Trachelectomies, broadly, can be divided into the simple and radical variants.

=== Radical ===
The formal name of this operation is radical vaginal trachelectomy (RVT) and also known as the Dargent operation and radical trachelectomy.

The word radical is used as, in addition to the cervix (like in radical hysterectomies), the parametria (tissue adjacent to the cervix) and vaginal cuff (the end of the vagina close to the cervix) are also excised as a part of the operation. It is usually done with a lymphadenectomy, to assess for tumour spread to the lymph nodes. This operation was pioneered by the renowned French Obstetrician-Gynecologist Surgeon, Daniel Dargent (1937–2005), who performed it for the first time in 1993.

=== Simple ===
A simple trachelectomy refers to the removal of the cervix; this can be considered to be a very large conization procedure.

== Indications ==
Radical trachelectomy is considered to be the optimal treatment for women of age ≤40 years with a desire to preserve fertility and stage IA2 or mild stage IB1 disease; more specifically, it is deemed appropriate when the disease consists of a tumour less than or equal to 2 cm in largest dimension and has not spread to lymph nodes. However, it is not yet considered the standard of care; hysterectomy is the standard of care.

Conization is considered the standard treatment for less advanced cancers (stage 1A1).

== Trachelectomy compared to other treatments ==
Data on long-term outcomes is limited. However, it appears that cancer recurrence and death are similar when compared to standard treatments (radical hysterectomy and radiation). Death and cancer recurrence rates (associated with the procedure) are approximately 3% and 5% respectively.

== Pregnancy post-trachelectomy ==
Following RVT, approximately 70% of patients that want to have children are able to conceive. However, absence of the cervix increases the risk of miscarriage and preterm delivery. Subsequent delivery is by caesarean section.

== See also ==
- Adenocarcinoma
- Cervical cancer staging
- Oncology
- List of surgeries by type
