= Cervical cancer =

Cancer arising from the cervix

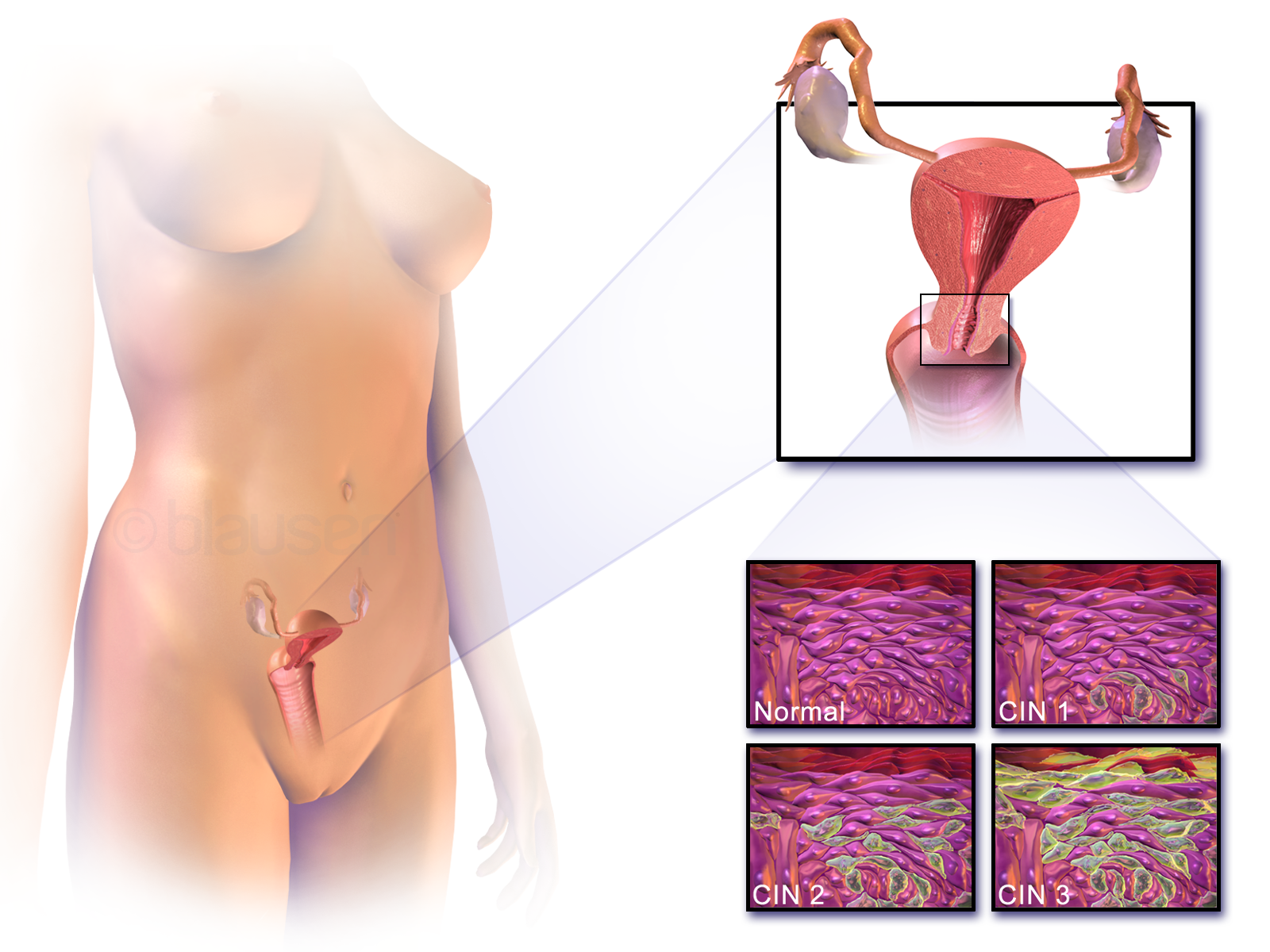
- Location of cervical cancer and an example of normal and abnormal cells
- Pronunciation: UK: /ˈsɜːrvɪkəl/ SUR-vik-əl, /sɜːrˈvaɪkəl/ sur-VY-kəl US: /ˈsɜːrvɪkəl/ SUR-vik-əl
- Specialty: Gynecologic oncology
- Symptoms: Early: none Later: vaginal bleeding, pelvic pain, pain during sexual intercourse
- Usual onset: Most common in young women
- Types: Squamous cell carcinoma, adenocarcinoma, others
- Causes: Human papillomavirus infection (HPV)
- Risk factors: Smoking, weak immune system, birth control pills, starting sex at a young age, many sexual partners or a partner with many sexual partners
- Diagnostic method: Cervical screening followed by a biopsy
- Prevention: Regular cervical screening, HPV vaccine, sexual intercourse with condoms, sexual abstinence
- Treatment: Surgery, chemotherapy, radiation therapy, immunotherapy
- Prognosis: Five-year survival rate: 69% (US); 46% (India)
- Frequency: 660,000 new cases (2022)
- Deaths: 350,000 (2022)

Cervical cancer is a type of cancer that develops in the cervix, the lower narrow part of the uterus (womb). It is due to the abnormal growth of cells that can invade or spread to other parts of the body. Early on, typically no symptoms are seen. Later symptoms may include abnormal vaginal bleeding, pelvic pain or pain during sexual intercourse. While bleeding after sex may not be serious, it may also indicate the presence of cervical cancer.

Almost all cases (99%) are linked to genital human papillomavirus infection (HPV); most who have had HPV infections, however, do not develop cervical cancer. The risk is higher in people who smoke, have a weakened immune system, use birth control, start sex at a young age and have many sexual partners. Cervical cancer typically develops from precancerous changes over 10 to 20 years. About 75% of cervical cancers are squamous cell carcinomas, 20–25% are adenocarcinoma. Diagnosis is typically by cervical screening followed by a biopsy. Medical imaging is then done to determine whether or not the cancer has spread beyond the cervix.

HPV vaccination is the most cost-effective public health measure against cervical cancer. HPV vaccines protect against two to seven high-risk strains of this family of viruses and may prevent up to 90% of cervical cancers. By the end of 2024, 147 countries provided the HPV vaccine in their national immunization schedule for girls. As of 2022, 47 countries also did it for boys. As they do not prevent all cervical cancer, guidelines recommend regular screening. Cervical screening allows for the detection of pre-cancer, which can be treated to prevent the development of cancer. Treatment may consist of some combination of surgery, chemotherapy, radiation therapy, and immunotherapy. Five-year survival rates in the United States are 69%, but outcomes depend on how early the cancer is detected.

Worldwide, cervical cancer is the fifth-most common type of cancer and the fourth-most common cause of death from cancer in women, with over 604,000 new cases and around 280,000 deaths in 2024. This is about 8% of the total cases and total deaths from cancer. Almost 90% of cases and deaths occur in low- and middle-income; it makes up 17% of overall cancer cases in women in these countries, compared to 2% in high-income countries. In developed countries, the widespread use of cervical screening programs has dramatically reduced rates of cervical cancer. In medical research, the most famous immortalized cell line, known as HeLa, was developed from cervical cancer cells of a woman named Henrietta Lacks.

The Cervical Cancer Elimination Day of Action is 17 November. The date marks the day in 2020 when the WHO launched the global strategy to accelerate the elimination of cervical cancer as a public health problem, with a resolution passed by 194 countries.

== Signs and symptoms ==
The early stages of cervical cancer may be completely free of symptoms. Vaginal bleeding, contact bleeding (one most common forms being bleeding after sexual intercourse), or (rarely) a vaginal mass may indicate the presence of cervical cancer. Also, moderate pain during sexual intercourse and vaginal discharge are symptoms of cervical cancer. Bleeding after douching, in between periods or after menopause are also common signs. In advanced disease, metastases may be present in the abdomen, lungs, or elsewhere.

Symptoms of advanced cervical cancer may include loss of appetite, weight loss, fatigue, pelvic pain, back pain, leg pain, swollen legs, heavy vaginal bleeding, bone fractures, and (rarely) leakage of urine or faeces from the vagina. Other signs of locally advanced disease (as the cancer invades organs in the pelvis) include an enlarged kidney with flank pain as urine flow from the kidneys to bladder is blocked, leg swelling and blood clots in the legs as pelvic veins are blocked, rectal bleeding, and bleeding in the urine.

== Causes ==
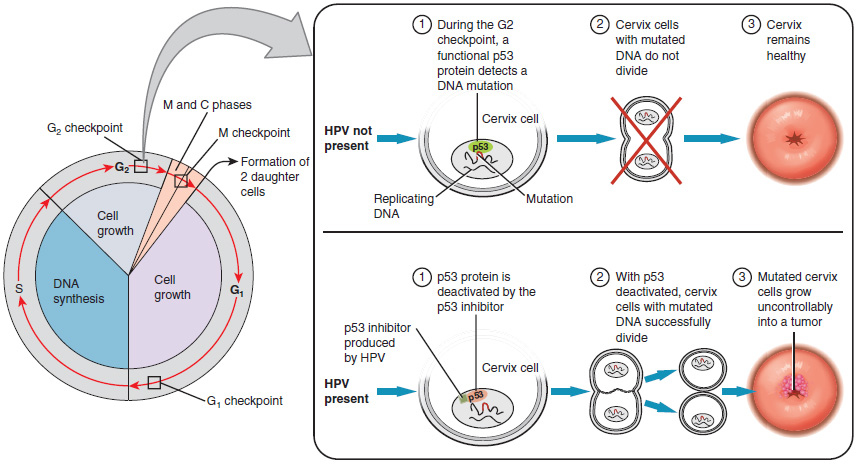
In most cases, cells infected with the HPV heal on their own. In some cases, however, the virus continues to spread and becomes an invasive cancer.

Infection with some types of HPV is the greatest risk factor for cervical cancer, followed by smoking. HIV infection is also a risk factor.

=== Human papillomavirus ===
Infection with HPV is thought to be required for cervical cancer to occur. HPV types 16 and 18 are the cause of 75% of cervical cancer cases globally, while 31 and 45 are the causes of another 10%.

Women who have multiple sexual partners, or have partners who have multiple sexual partners, regardless of sex, are at higher risk of cervical cancer.

Over 200 types of HPV known, 12 are classified as high-risk types (16, 18, 31, 33, 35, 39, 45, 51, 52, 56, 58, and 59), three as probable high-risk (26, 53, and 66), and 12 as low-risk (6, 11, 40, 42, 43, 44, 54, 61, 70, 72, 81, and CP6108). Most cases of squamous cell carcinomas of the cervix are due to HPV type 16 and most cases of adenocarcinoma are due to HPV type 18. High risk HPV viral subtypes can integrate their DNA into the host genome and induce transcription of the viral cancer causing proteins E6 and E7. E6 degrades the tumor suppressing protein p53 and E7 degrades and inactivates the tumor suppressing protein pRb. The loss of p53 and pRb leads to increased blood vessel growth feeding tumors (via vascular endothelial growth factor (VEGF) over-expression), loss of tumor cell suppression and cell cycle regulation disruptions, all of which can lead to cervical cancer.

Genital warts, which are a form of benign tumor of epithelial cells, are also caused by various strains of HPV. However, these serotypes are usually not related to cervical cancer. Having multiple strains at the same time is common, including those that can cause cervical cancer along with those that cause warts.r

=== Co-infections and immunosuppression ===
Having a HPV infection at the same time with other sexually transmitted infections increases risks. This includes HIV and trich (a parasitic infection) and likely chlamydia. A HIV infection makes it more difficult for the body to clear the HPV infection. Women with inflammatory bowel disease who are on immunosuppressive medication also have a higher chance of developing cervical cancer.

=== Smoking ===
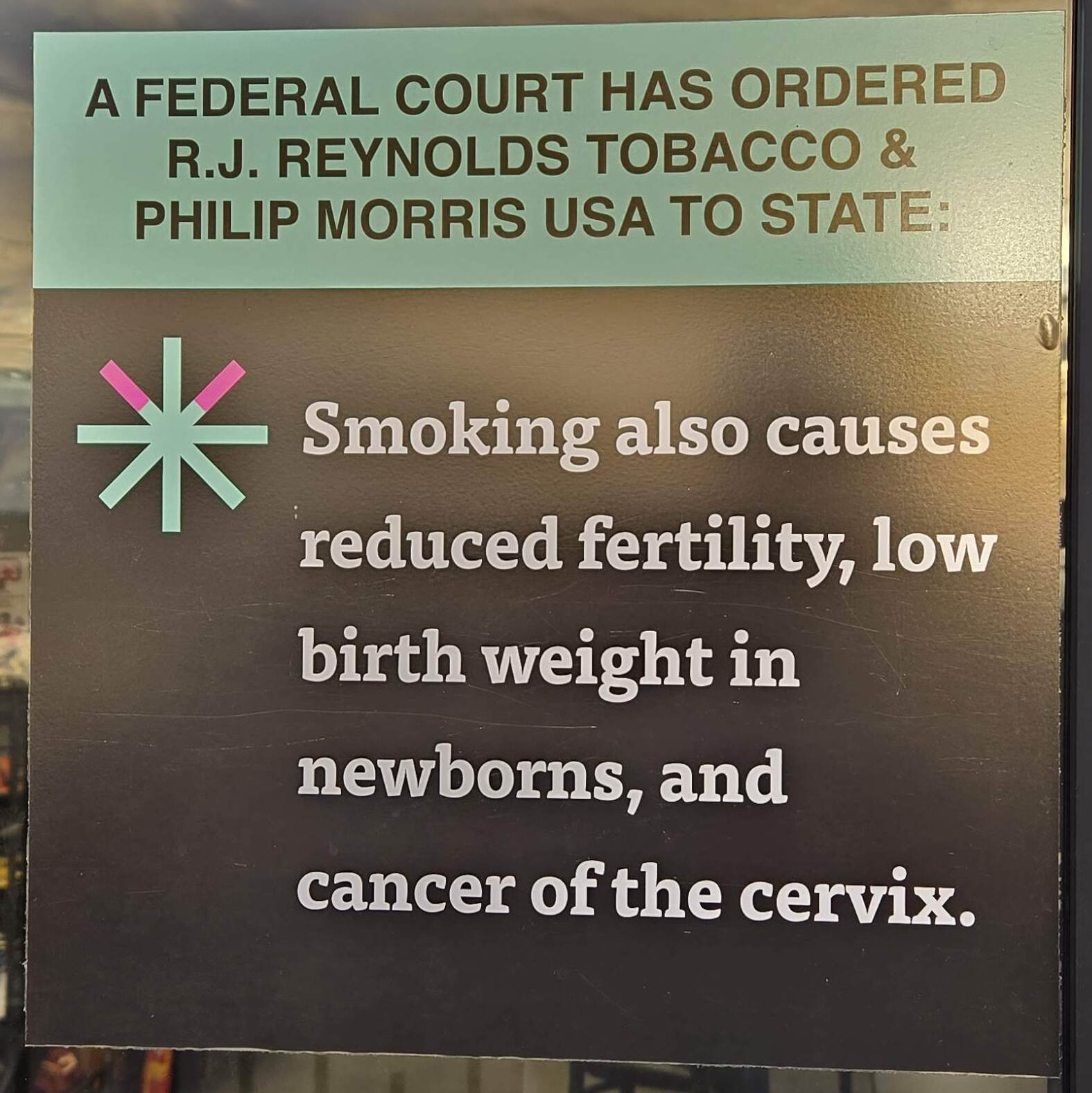
A court-ordered corrective statement: "Smoking also causes reduced fertility, low birth weight in newborns, and cancer of the cervix" (United States, 2024).

Cigarette smoking, both active and passive, increases the risk of cervical cancer. Among HPV-infected women, current and former smokers have roughly two to three times the incidence of invasive cancer. Passive smoking is also associated with increased risk, but to a lesser extent. Smoking negatively affects the immune system, making it more difficult for the body to fight off a HPV infection: the virus persists for longer. Smoking can also increase the risk a HPV infection leads to cancer.

=== Oral contraceptives ===
Long-term use of oral contraceptives is associated with increased risk of cervical cancer in women who have had HPV. Women who have used oral contraceptives for 5 to 9 years have about three times the incidence of invasive cancer, and those who used them for 10 years or longer have about four times the risk.

=== Multiple pregnancies ===
Having many pregnancies is associated with an increased risk of cervical cancer. Among HPV-infected women, those who have had seven or more full-term pregnancies have around four times the risk of cancer compared with women with no pregnancies, and two to three times the risk of women who have had one or two full-term pregnancies.

== Prevention ==
=== Vaccination ===
Six HPV vaccines are licensed: three bivalent vaccines that protect against two HPV types, two quadrivalent vaccines covering four types, and one nonavalent vaccine that protects against nine types. Three HPV vaccines (Gardasil, Gardasil 9, and Cervarix) reduce the risk of cancerous or precancerous changes of the cervix and perineum by about 93% and 62%, respectively. All have excellent safety profiles and are highly efficacious, or have met immunobridging standards. The vaccines are between 92% and 100% effective against HPV 16 and 18.

The main target group for HPV vaccination is young adolescent girls, aged 9–14, who get one dose. For older girls and women, and for those living with HIV or otherwise immonocompromised, additional vaccines may be necessary. As of 2022, 125 countries include HPV vaccines in their routine vaccinations for girls, and 47 countries recommend them for boys, as well.

Many girls in low- and middle-income countries do not have access to the vaccine. Initially, two doses of the vaccine were given for everyone, but the WHO recommendation changed as it has appeared that a single dose is normally as effective as multiple doses. The WHO goal is to get 90% of girls vaccinated by 2030, up from 13% in 2021. This is more achievable on the new single-dose schedule.

=== Screening ===
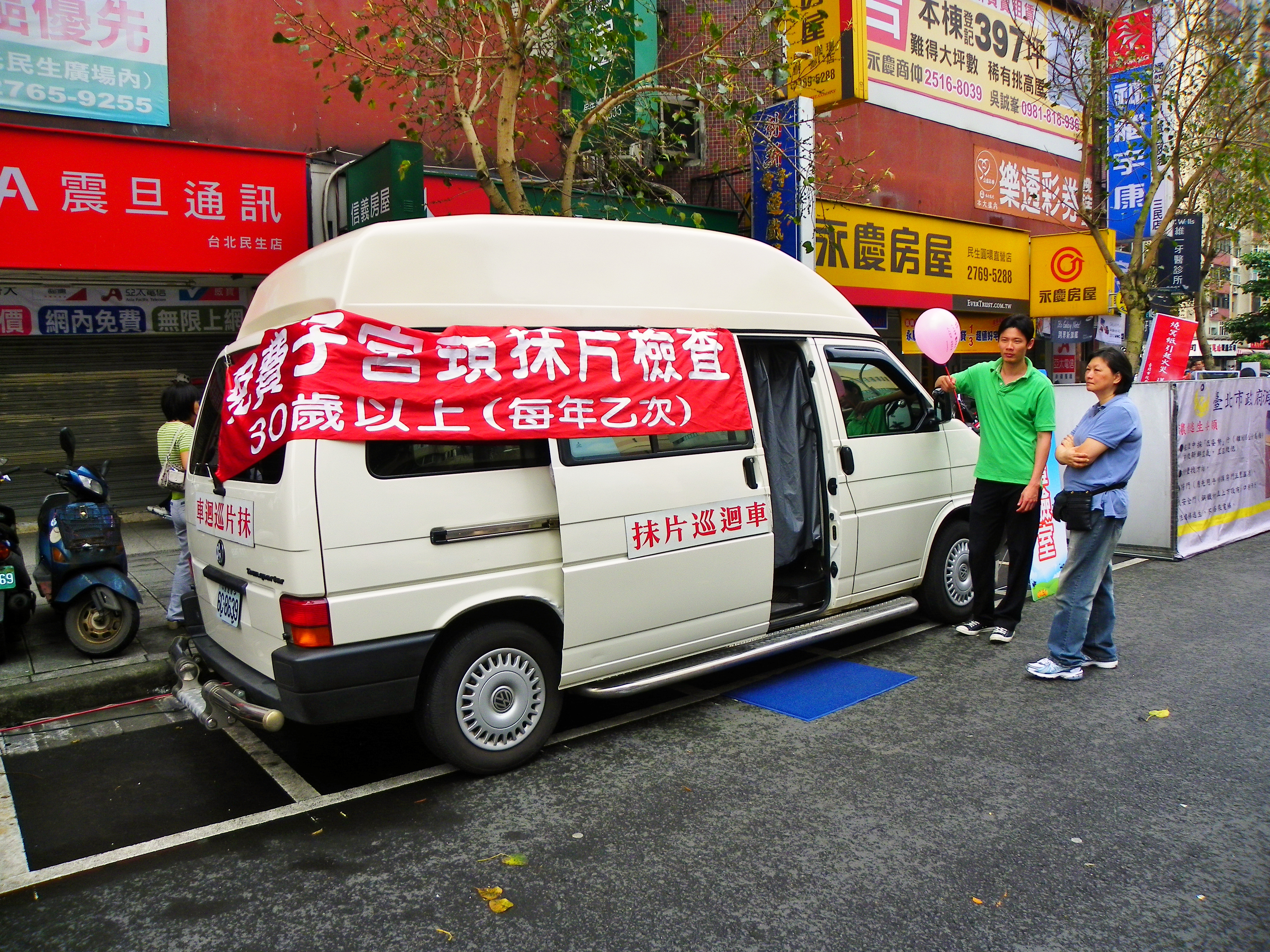
Cervical screening test vehicle in Taiwan

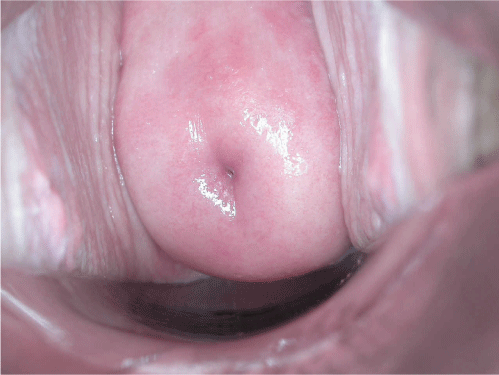
Negative visual inspection with acetic acid of the cervix

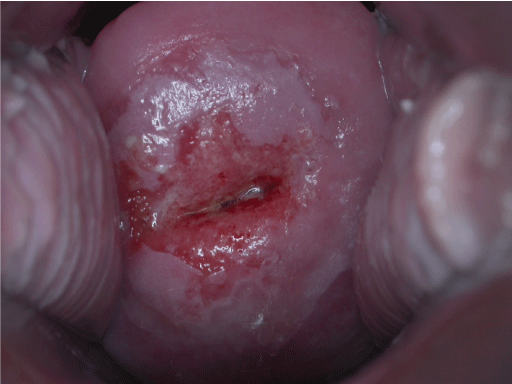
Positive visual inspection with acetic acid of the cervix for CIN-1

Cervical screening for pre-cancerous changes is highly effective in preventing cervical cancer cases and deaths. Different screening methods are in use. The WHO recommends testing for HPV infections as the primary method of screening, but as of 2022, most countries still used a Pap test, which examines cells for (pre)cancerous changes directly. Visual inspection with acetic acid was used in many low-resource regions; the WHO recommends a rapid change to HPV testing for these regions, as accuracy is quite low.

Screening can reveal who is at risk of, or who has abnormal cells on the surface of the cervix called cervical intraepithelial neoplasia (CIN). These precancerous changes can be confirmed with an internal examination known as colposcopy. Low-grade CIN often goes away by itself, but higher-grade CIN frequency changes into cancer later.

The World Health Organization (WHO) recommends screening starts at 30 years of age, except for those living with HIV, where it recommends screening to start at age 25. The 2025 European guidelines recommend screening women between 25 and 64 years using a HPV test. For those between 65 and 69, testing is recommended if there has not been a screening in the last 10 years. In the United States, testing starts at 21.

Recommended intervals depends on the country, type of test, and population risk levels.The WHO recommends a screening interval of 5–10 years for a HPV test, which is increased to 3–5 years for those living with HIV. For countries still using Pap tests, this would be every 3 years. In the United States, screening is recommended to take place every 3 years for a Pap test and every 5 years for a HPV test. HPV vaccination status does not change screening rates.

People who test positively on a HPV test or a Pap smear test, but then negatively during a closer inspection in a colposcopy are recommended to be retested more frequently. The same is true for those who were treated for (pre-)cancer, often after 12 months.

==== Screening promoting strategies ====
Personal invitations encouraging women to get screened are effective at increasing the likelihood that they will do so. Educational materials also help increase the likelihood that women will go for screening, but they are not as effective as invitations.

Interventions can help increase rates of cervical cancer screenings, specifically among low and middle-income countries. In efforts to increase life-saving screenings, interventions have proved successful. Single interventions include reminding patients via phone calls, SMS, and subsidized or free services. Combined interventions include multiple steps and can be more effective than single interventions, specifically health education combined with SMS. These interventions make cervical cancer screenings more accessible and less daunting for many at-risk women.

=== Condoms ===
The use of condoms during sexual intercourse decreases but does not eliminate the risk of transmitting the infection. Condoms help protect against infection when used for vaginal, anal and oral sex. They do not necessarily cover all the areas infected with HPV, so they do not offer full protection.

=== Nutrition ===
Vitamin A is associated with a lower risk as are vitamin B12, vitamin C, vitamin E, and beta-Carotene.

== Diagnosis ==
An awareness video about Cervical Cancer

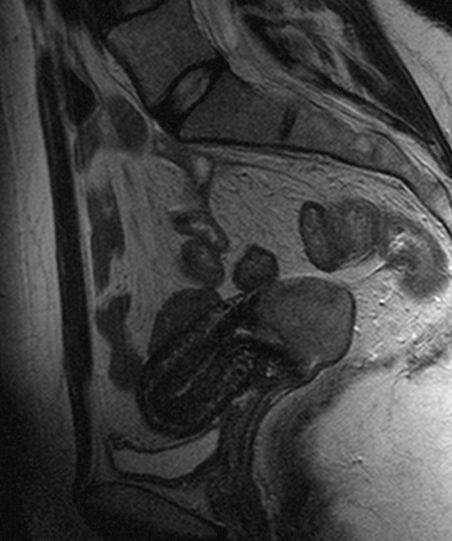
Cervical cancer seen on a T2-weighted sagittal MR image of the pelvis

=== Biopsy ===
Confirmation of the diagnosis of cervical cancer or precancer requires a biopsy of the cervix. This is often done through colposcopy, a magnified visual inspection of the cervix aided by using a dilute acetic acid (e.g. vinegar) solution to highlight abnormal cells on the surface of the cervix, with visual contrast provided by staining the normal tissues a mahogany brown with Lugol's iodine.

Medical devices used for biopsy of the cervix include punch forceps. Colposcopic impression, the estimate of disease severity based on the visual inspection, forms part of the diagnosis. Further diagnostic and treatment procedures are loop electrical excision procedure and cervical conization, in which the inner lining of the cervix is removed to be examined pathologically. These are carried out if the biopsy confirms severe cervical intraepithelial neoplasia.

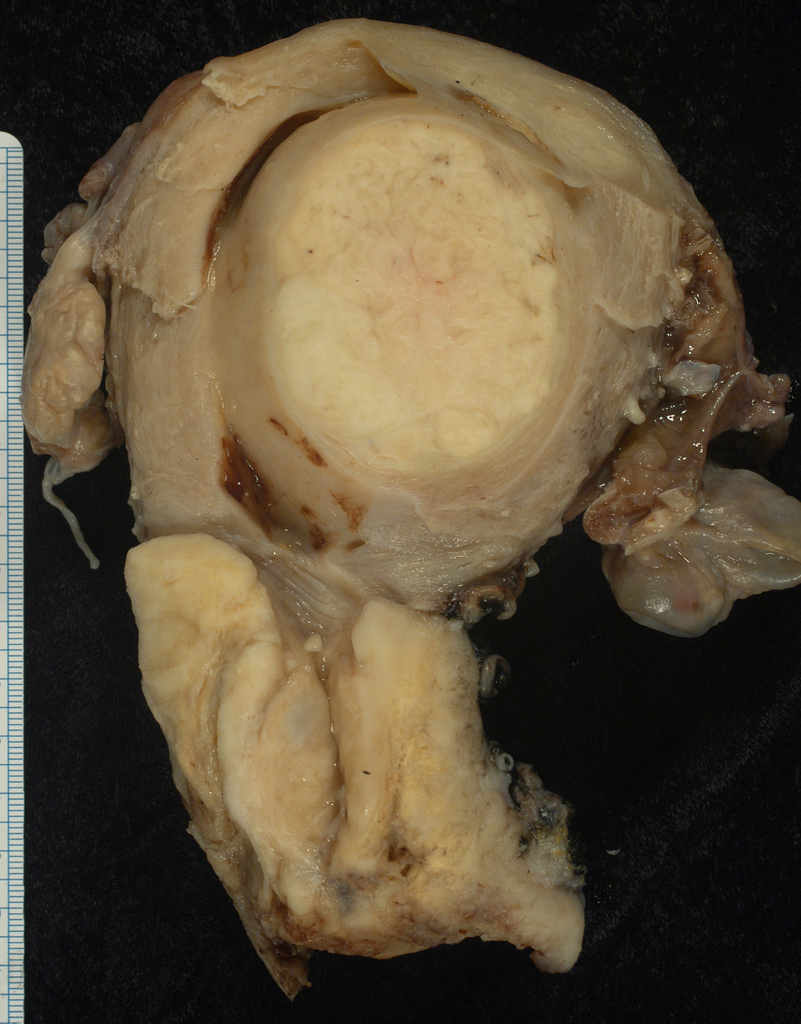
This large squamous carcinoma (bottom of the picture) has obliterated the cervix and invaded the lower uterine segment. The uterus also has a round leiomyoma up higher.

Interventions such as playing music during the procedure and viewing the procedure on a monitor can reduce the anxiety associated with the examination.

=== Precancerous lesions ===
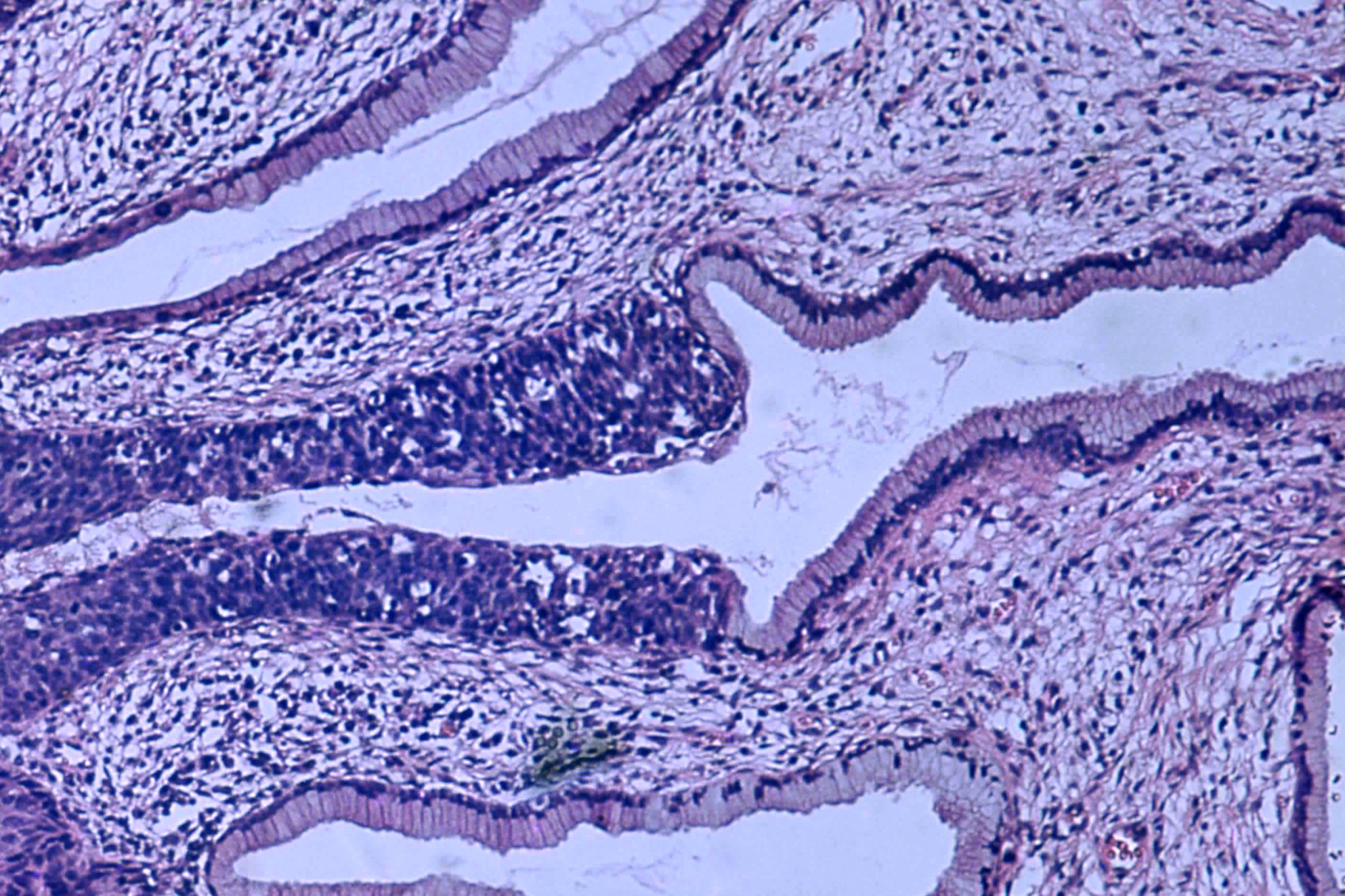
Histopathologic image (H&E stain) of carcinoma in situ (also called CIN3), stage 0: The normal architecture of stratified squamous epithelium is replaced by irregular cells that extend throughout its full thickness. Normal columnar epithelium is also seen.

Cervical intraepithelial neoplasia (CIN) means the development of abnormal cells on the surface of the cervix. HPV infections cause CIN, but in most cases, it is resolved by the immune system. However, a small percentage of people might develop a more serious CIN, which, if left untreated, can develop into cervical cancer. CIN is often diagnosed during routine Pap smear examination or colposcopy.

The naming and histologic classification of cervical carcinoma precursor lesions has changed many times over the 20th century. The World Health Organization classification system was descriptive of the lesions, naming them mild, moderate, or severe dysplasia or carcinoma in situ (CIS). The term cervical intraepithelial neoplasia (CIN) was developed to place emphasis on the spectrum of abnormality in these lesions and to help standardize treatment. For premalignant dysplastic changes, cervical intraepithelial neoplasia grading (CIN 1–3) is used. It classifies mild dysplasia as CIN1, moderate dysplasia as CIN2, and severe dysplasia and CIS as CIN3. More recently, CIN2 and CIN3 have been combined into CIN2/3. These results are what a pathologist might report from a biopsy.

These should not be confused with the Bethesda system terms for Pap test (cytopathology) results. Among the Bethesda results: Low-grade squamous intraepithelial lesion (LSIL) and high-grade squamous intraepithelial lesion (HSIL). An LSIL Pap may correspond to CIN1, and HSIL may correspond to CIN2 and CIN3, but they are results of different tests, and the Pap test results need not match the histologic findings.

=== Cancer subtypes ===
Histologic subtypes of invasive cervical carcinoma include:

- Squamous cell carcinoma (about 80–85%)
- adenocarcinoma (about 15% of cervical cancers in the UK)
- Adenosquamous carcinoma
- Small cell carcinoma
- Neuroendocrine tumour
- Glassy cell carcinoma
- Villoglandular adenocarcinoma
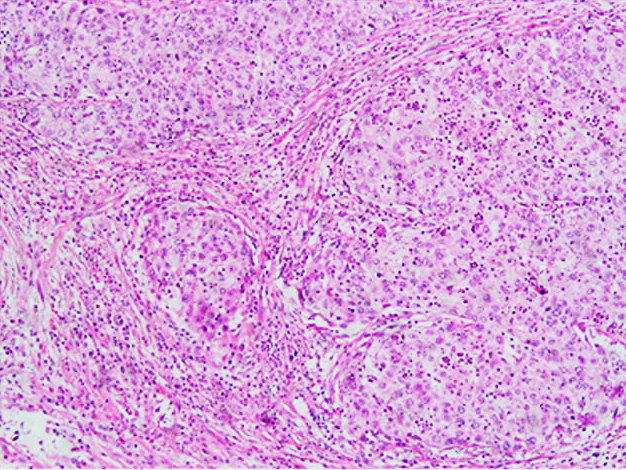
Invasive squamous cell carcinoma of the cervix is characterized by infiltration as irregular anastomosing nests or single cells. This case is poorly differentiated. H&E stain.

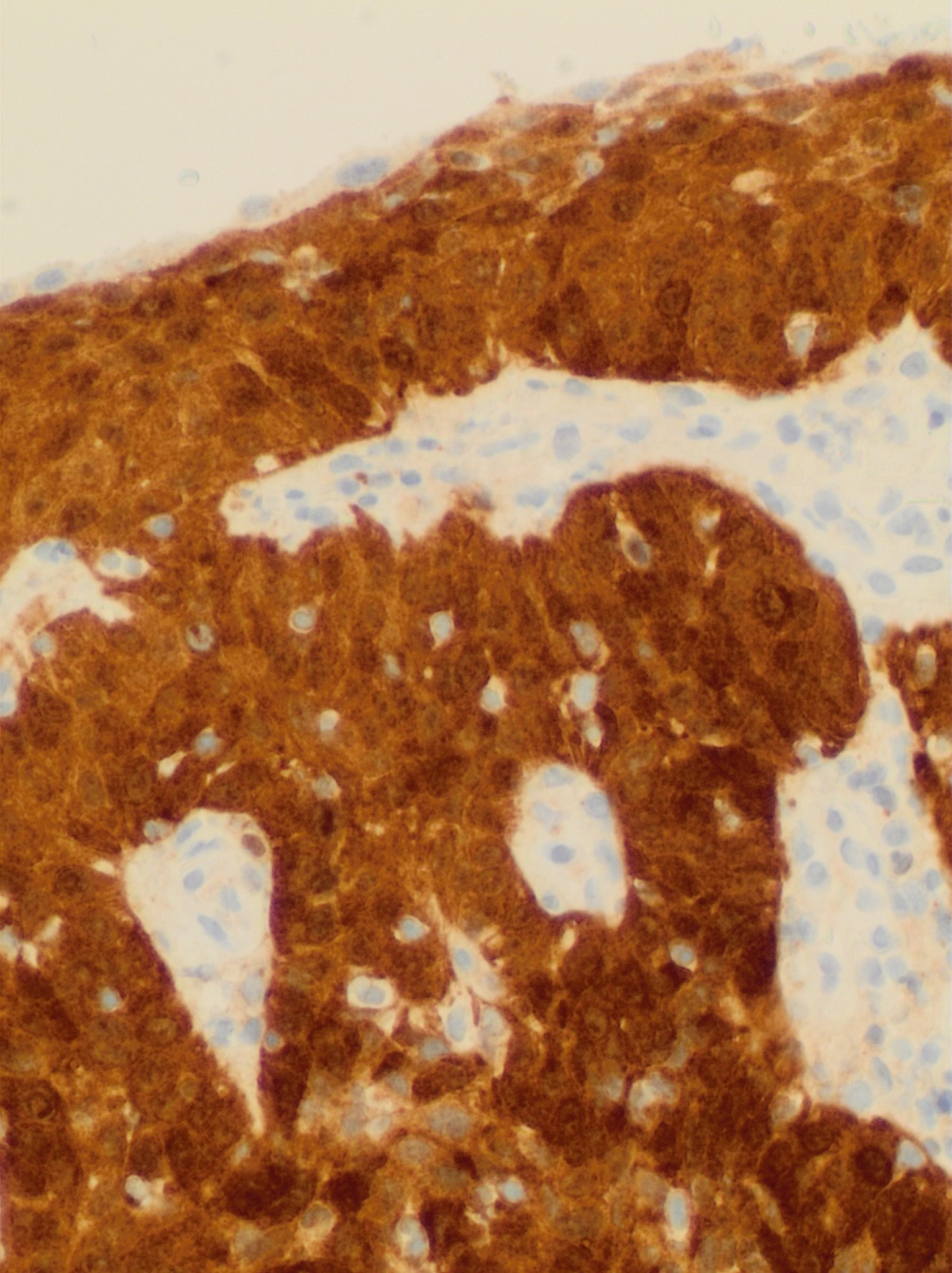
Cervical squamous cell carcinoma generally shows diffuse staining of both nuclei and cytoplasm on p16 immuno-
histochemistry (except verrucous variant).

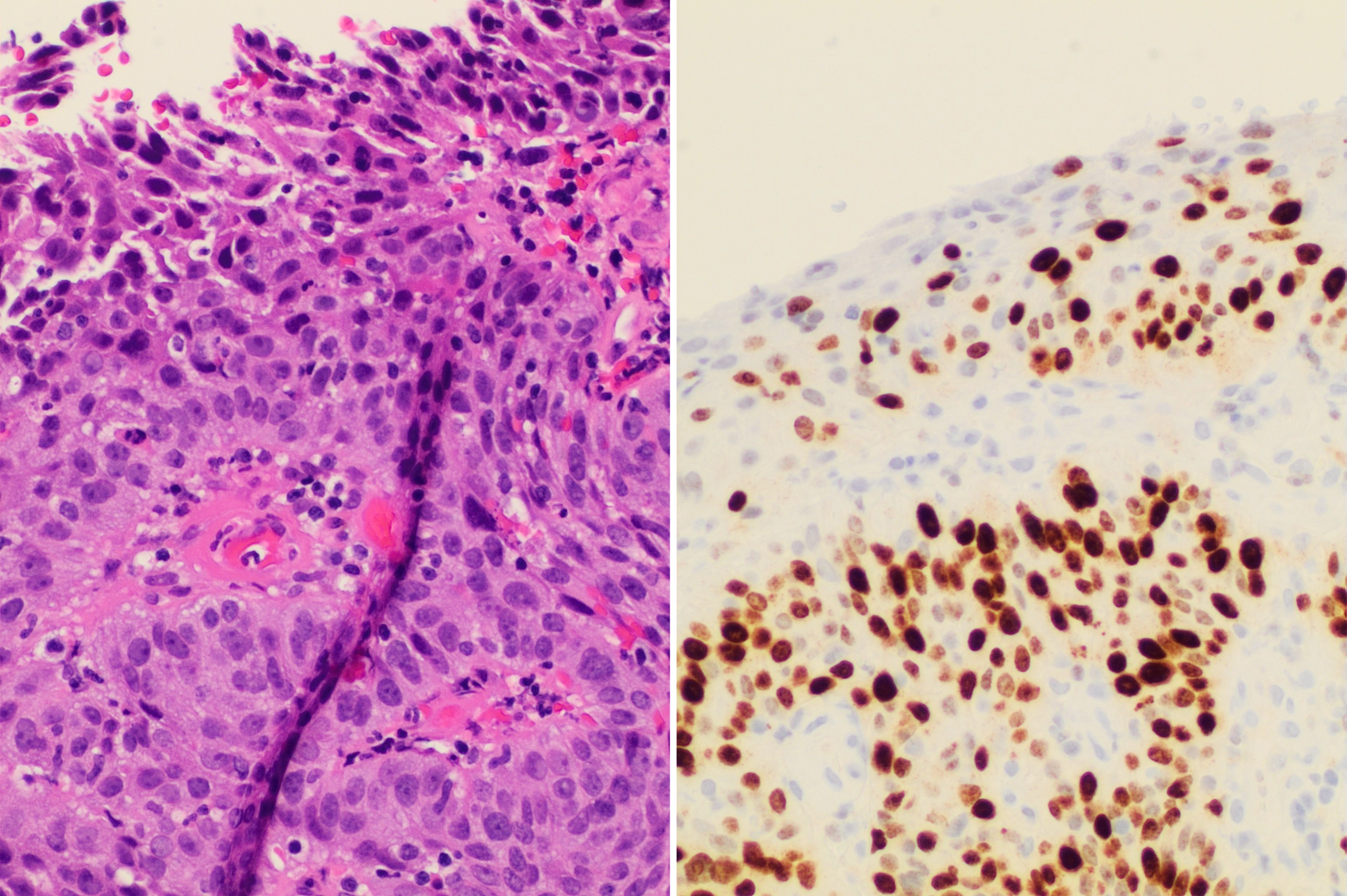
Invasive cervical squamous cell carcinoma on H&E histopathology and Ki-67 immunohistochemistry. The latter correlates well with the degree and level of dysplasia.

The location of cervical cancer can be described in terms of quadrants, or corresponding to a clock face when the subject is in supine position.

Though squamous cell carcinoma is the cervical cancer with the highest incidence, the incidence of adenocarcinoma of the cervix has been increasing in recent decades. Endocervical adenocarcinoma represents 20–25% of the histological types of cervical carcinoma. Gastric-type mucinous adenocarcinoma of the cervix is a rare type of cancer with aggressive behavior. This type of malignancy is not related to high-risk human papillomavirus (HPV). Noncarcinoma malignancies, which can rarely occur in the cervix, include melanoma and lymphoma.

=== Staging ===
Cervical cancer is staged by the 2018 FIGO system, which is based on clinical findings (symptoms and signs found during a physical exam), imaging and pathological examination of tissue samples viewed under a microscope. The cancer is staged so that the best treatment can be selected and a prognosis can be given. There are 9 stages, ranging from microscopic cancer in stage 1A to metastatic cancer spread to distant organs in stage 4B. The stages are further subdivided into sub-stages, e.g. 1B3.

Before the 2018 revisions to FIGO staging, the system allowed only these diagnostic tests to be used in determining the stage: palpation, inspection, colposcopy, endocervical curettage, hysteroscopy, cystoscopy, proctoscopy, intravenous urography, and X-ray examination of the lungs and skeleton, and cervical conization.

Stage 1A cervical cancer

Stage 1B cervical cancer

Stage 2A cervical cancer

Stage 2B cervical cancer

Stage 3B cervical cancer

Stage 4A cervical cancer

Stage 4B cervical cancer

== Treatment ==
The treatment of cervical cancer varies worldwide, largely due to access to surgeons skilled in radical pelvic surgery and the emergence of fertility-sparing therapy in developed nations.

Less advanced stages of cervical cancer typically have treatment options that allow fertility to be maintained if the patient desires.

Because cervical cancers are radiosensitive, radiation may be used in all stages where surgical options do not exist. Surgical intervention may have better outcomes than radiological approaches. In addition, chemotherapy can be used to treat cervical cancer and is more effective than radiation alone. Chemoradiotherapy may increase overall survival and reduce the risk of disease recurrence compared to radiotherapy alone.

For surgery to be curative, the entire cancer must be removed with no cancer found at the margins of the removed tissue on examination under a microscope. For recurrent cancer, a surgical procedure may remove the uterus, cervix, vagina and bladder.

=== Precancerous lesions ===
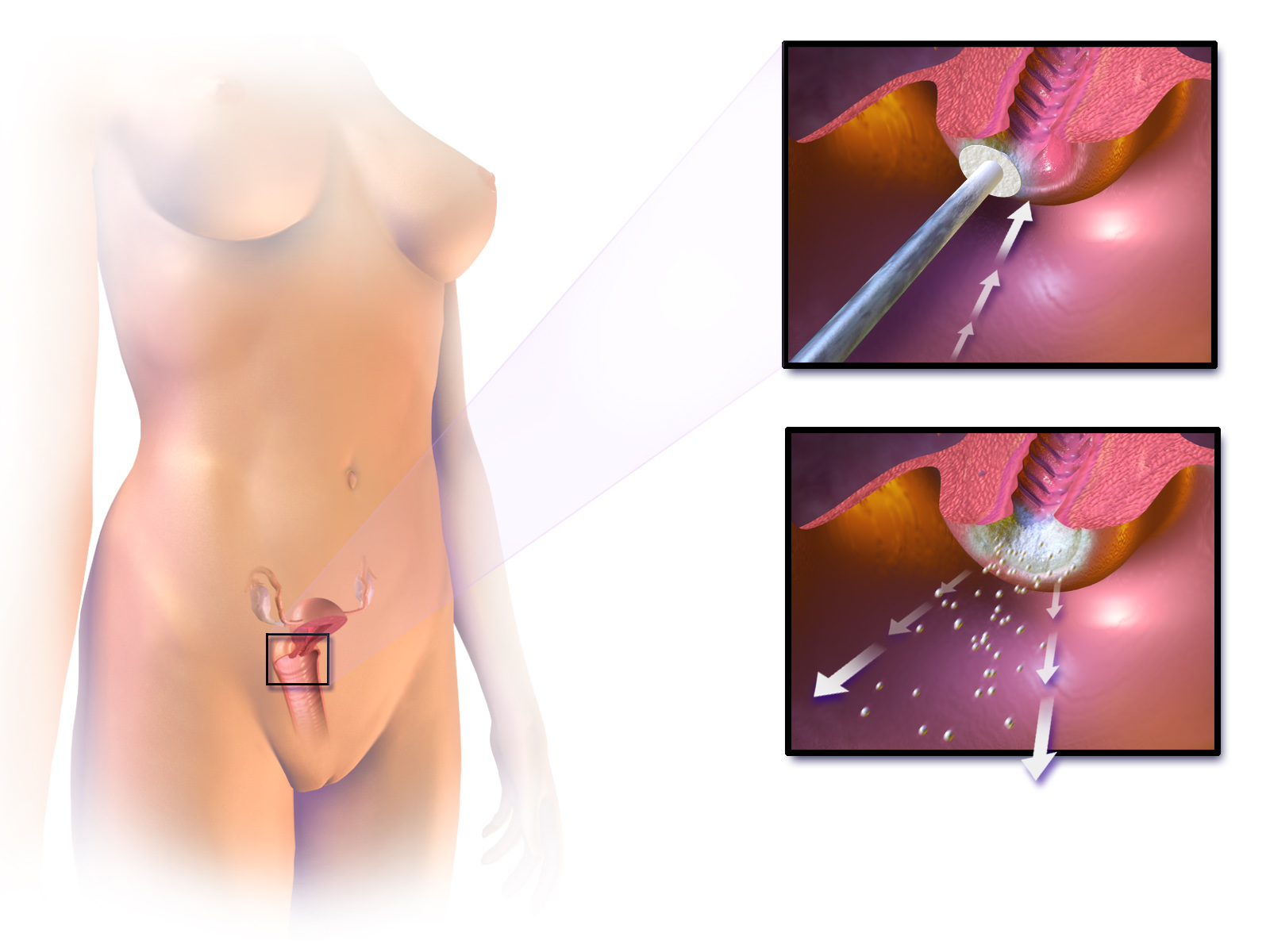
Cervical cryotherapy

Precancerous cells (cervical intraepithelial neoplasia) that would lead to cancer can be treated effectively by surgery. Surgical methods include excision, where a cone-shaped portion of the cervix is removed (e.g. a loop electrical excision procedure), and ablation, which removes only the parts with abnormal tissues with heat (e.g. a laser) or cold (cryotherapy).

While these effectively reduce the risk of cancer developing or spreading, they increase the risk of premature birth in future pregnancies. Procedures that remove more cervical tissue lower the chance of the cancer coming back, but they also raise the risk of preterm birth. Due to this risk, taking into account the age, childbearing plans of the woman, and the size and location of the cancer cells are crucial for choosing the right procedure.

=== Early stage ===
Trachelectomy, the removal of the cervix, a choice in microinvasive cancer that preserves fertility

Treatment for early stage cervical cancer depends on whether fertility is a priority. In stages IA to IIA there are typically fertility-preserving options.

Stage IA1 cancer can be treated with a cone biopsy, just like pre-cancerous lesions. If the cone biopsy shows cancer cells at the edge of the removed tissue (that is, the margins are not clear), further surgery is needed. This can be a repeat cone biopsy or a trachelectomy, which removes the cervix. If fertility is not a priority, a simple or radical hysterectomy (removal of the whole uterus, including part of the vagina) is an option. Open surgery has better survival outcomes than keyhole surgery for radical hysterectomy.

For stage IA2, the lymph nodes are removed as well with a cone biopsy or trachelectomy. Alternatives that do not preserve fertility include external beam radiotherapy to the pelvis with brachytherapy (internal radiation), or a radical hysterectomy. In radiotherapy, or radiation therapy, high-energy x-rays or alternative forms of radiation are used to kill cancer cells. The use of a Smit sleeve can help with the correct placement of brachytherapy.

In stage IB1 and IB2, the only fertility-sparing option is a radical trachelectomy with removal of lymph nodes. A radical abdominal trachelectomy with lymphadenectomy usually only requires a two- to three-day hospital stay, and most women recover very quickly (about six weeks). Complications are uncommon, although women who can conceive after surgery are susceptible to preterm labour and possible late miscarriage. A wait of at least one year is generally recommended before attempting to become pregnant after surgery. Recurrence in the residual cervix is rare if the trachelectomy has cleared the cancer.

Early stages (IB1 and IIA less than 4 cm) can be treated with radical hysterectomy with removal of the lymph nodes or radiation therapy. Radiation therapy is given as external beam radiotherapy to the pelvis and brachytherapy (internal radiation). Women treated with surgery who have high-risk features found on pathologic examination are given radiation therapy with or without chemotherapy to reduce the risk of relapse. A Cochrane review has found moderate-certainty evidence that radiation decreases the risk of disease progression in people with stage IB cervical cancer when compared to no further treatment. However, little evidence was found on its effects on overall survival.

For pregnant women with early-stage cervical cancer, one option is to monitor the cancer. In the third tremester, a drug can be given to help speed up the development of lungs of the fetus. A C-section in week 34 of pregnancy avoids vaginal delivery, which can be dangerous with the cancer. The C-section surgery is combined with a hysterectomy. Chemotherapy can be administered from the second tremester, but would interfere with development of the fetus in the first.

=== Locally advanced ===
Brachytherapy for cervical cancer

Locally advanced tumors (stages IB3–IVA) are typically treated with concurrent radiation and chemotherapy. In earlier stage locally advanced cancer, a hysterectomy is sometimes an option, which would be followed by chemoradiation if the surgery finds cancer in the lymph nodes or at the margins of the removed tissue. A Cochrane review found a lack of evidence on the benefits and harms of primary hysterectomy compared to primary chemoradiotherapy for cervical cancer in stage IB2 (now IB3).

Cisplatin and carboplatin are typical chemotherapy drugs used in cervical cancer. Cisplatin is preferably used, but carboplatin has fewer side effects, and is used in those intolerant to cisplatin. These two platinum-based chemotherapy drugs, in addition to radiation seems not only to improve survival but also to reduce risk of recurrence in women with early-stage cervical cancer (IA2–IIA).

A short intense course of chemotherapy before radiochemotherapy starts (induction chemotherapy) likely increased survival. Similarly, in those with high-risk locally advanced cancer, the immunotherapy drug pembrolizumab seems to increase survival.

Diagram showing the area removed with a posterior surgery

Diagram showing the area removed with a total operation

Diagram showing the area removed with an anterior operation

=== Recurrent or metastatic ===
Recurrent or metastatic cervical cancer is usually not considered curable. Standard treatment starts from a combination of chemotherapy drugs cisplatin or carboplatin, with another chemotherapy drug paclitaxel. Various drugs are added to this combination. One option is to add bevacizumab, a drug that hinders new blood vessel formation. The HPV virus stimulates the creation of new blood vessels, which this drug counteracts.

A further addition is immunotherapy, which stimulates the body's immune system to treat cancer. If the tumor is PD-L1 positive (which is true for most recurrent or metastatic tumors), pembrolizumab can be added to the treatment. Pembrolizumab is an immune checkpoint inhibitor, which removed the 'breaks' from the immune system that normally prevent it from attacking healthy cells. Cancer sometimes evades the immune system via these immune checkpoints. Two other immune checkpoint inhibitors are used for cervical cancer: cemiplimab (Libtayo), for people with recurrent cancer after prior systemic treatment, and Nivolumab (Opdivo), which is used after all other options have been tried.

As a second-line treatment, tisotumab vedotin (Tivdak), an antibody-drug conjugate, can be used. The antibody binds to a protein on the cancer cells, so it can enter the cell. Once inside, the linked chemotherapy drug can directly destroy the cancer cell. As such, it is a targeted therapy. It was approved in the United States in 2021, and in the EU in 2025.

=== Psychosocial intervention ===
Psychosocial interventions among cervical cancer patients decrease depression and anxiety levels, all while having a positive impact on quality of life, cortisol levels, self-efficacy, fatigue, sleep status, and sexual dysfunction. Mindfulness-based interventions have been proven helpful in additionally decreasing depression and anxiety levels of patients with cervical cancer.

== Prognosis ==
=== Stage ===
The prognosis depends on the stage of the cancer. The prognosis for squamous cell carcinoma and adenocarcinoma of the cervix is roughly the same for each given stage. For pre-cancerous lesions, the prognosis is good. In the United States, the five-year survival rate for FIGO stage 1 (cancer confined to the cervix) cervical cancer is 91%, and the overall (all stages combined) five-year survival rate is about 68%. Five-year survival in Stage 2 disease (cancer invading beyond upper two-thirds of uterus) is 65%. Stage 3 disease (in which the lower one-third of vagina, pelvic wall is involved or presence of hydronephrosis, pelvic or peri-aortic lymph node involvement) is 35%. Stage 4 disease, in which cancer extends beyond the pelvis, or involves the bladder or rectum, has a 5-year survival rate of 7%.

Almost a third of women with locally advanced cancer will have recurrent disease after treatment.

=== By country ===
There is an ethnic disparity in five-year survival in the United States. Average survival rates of the dominant squamous cell carcinoma are 72% for Hispanic and Asian-Pacific women, 68% for White women and 61% for Black women.

Regular screening has meant that precancerous changes and early-stage cervical cancers have been detected and treated early. Figures suggest that cervical screening is saving 5,000 lives each year in the UK by preventing cervical cancer. About 1,000 women per year die of cervical cancer in the UK. All of the Nordic countries have cervical cancer screening programs in place. The Pap test was integrated into clinical practice in the Nordic countries in the 1960s.

In Africa, outcomes are often worse as diagnosis is frequently at a later stage of the disease. In a scoping review of publicly-available cervical cancer prevention and control plans from African countries, plans tended to emphasize survivorship rather than early HPV diagnosis and prevention.

Cervical cancer death rate in women

Number of deaths from cervical cancer

=== Adverse effects ===
Chemotherapy works by attacking cells that rapidly divide. This kills cancer cells, but can also impact normal cells, leading to adverse side effects. Common chemotherapy side effects include: hair loss, mouth sores, loss of appetite, diarrhea, nausea and vomiting, premature menopause, infertility, and damage to the blood-forming cells within bone marrow. Most acute side effects are temporary, dissipating when treatment ceases, but some can be long-lasting or permanent. Long-term chemotherapy side effects include changes in the menstrual cycle, neuropathy, and nephrotoxicity.

Radiation therapy (RT) adverse effects; for a complete side effect list see

Curative cervical radiation therapy may affect unintended tissues located within the delivery pathway(s) or adjacent to the target lesion, each tissue with a unique sensitivity and response to radiation injury. Common acute RT effects involve the gastrointestinal system, e.g., diarrhea and constipation; urinary tract, e.g., frequent urination; and may cause cervicitis. Common late RT complications include: infertility or premature ovarian failure; vaginal stenosis; lower motor neuron syndrome; telangiectasias, and subsequent hemorrhage; and progressive myelopathy, which may result in irreversible neurologic deficits ranging from minor sensory symptoms to complete paraplegia. Radiotherapy late effects (with occurrence rates) include osteonecrosis (8–20%), bladder ulceration (<3%), vaginal stenosis (>2.5%) and chronic pelvic radiation disease (1–10%), e.g., irreversible lumbosacral plexopathy.

Pelvic radiation also induces secondary malignancies such as leukemia, lymphoma, bladder cancer, pelvic malignancy, colorectal cancer, bone, and soft-tissue sarcoma with occurrence rates between 0.2 and 1.0% per year for each.

== Epidemiology ==
Rate of new cervical cancer cases

Worldwide, cervical cancer is both the fourth-most common type of cancer and the fourth-most common cause of death from cancer in women, with over 660,000 new cases and around 350,000 deaths in 2022. It is the second-most common cause of female-specific cancer after breast cancer, accounting for around 8% of both total cancer cases and total cancer deaths in women. In 2020, 88% of cervical cancers and 90% of deaths occurred in low- and middle-income countries (LMICs). It is the most frequently detected cancer during pregnancy, with an occurrence of 1.5 to 12 for every 100,000 pregnancies.

[Cervical cancers] account for 17% of all cancers in women, compared with only 2% in high-income countries (HICs). In sub-Saharan Africa, the region with the highest rates of young women living with HIV (WLWH), approximately 20% of cervical cancer cases occur in WLWH. HPV infection is more likely to persist and to progress to cancer in WLWH. Mortality rates vary 50-fold between countries, ranging from <2 per 100,000 women in some HICs to >40 per 100,000 in some countries of sub-Saharan Africa.

=== Africa ===
Of the 20 hardest hit countries by cervical cancer, 19 are in Africa.

The Nigerian Institute of Medical Research (NIMR) reports that 28 Nigerian women lose their lives daily due to this disease. Many Nigerian women lack access to these preventive measures. In many regions of the country, screening tests such as Pap tests and HPV tests are not easily accessible or affordable.

=== Australia ===
Australia is on target to eliminate cervical cancer, defined as having fewer than four new cases per 100,000 women annually. It anticipates achieving this by 2033.

In 2022, it is estimated that 942 new cases of cervical cancer will be diagnosed in Australia. In 2022, it is estimated that a female has a 1 in 180 (or 0.56%) risk of being diagnosed with cervical cancer by the age of 85.

In 2020, there were 165 women aged 25–74 who died from cervical cancer, which is a mortality rate of 2 deaths per 100,000 women in the population. Over the 5 years 2016–2020, the age-standardised mortality rate among Aboriginal and Torres Strait Islander women was 3.8 times the rate of non-Indigenous Australians.

The number of women diagnosed with cervical cancer has dropped on average by 4.5% each year since organised screening began in 1991 (1991–2005).

=== Asia ===
In India, the number of people with cervical cancer is rising, but overall, the age-adjusted rates are decreasing. Usage of condoms in the female population has improved the survival of women with cancers of the cervix.

Hundreds of women in Nepal are diagnosed with cervical cancer each year, primarily caused by human papillomavirus (HPV) infection. In February 2025, Nepal launched a nationwide HPV vaccination campaign targeting over 1.6 million girls aged 10–15, supported by WHO, UNICEF, and GAVI, alongside educational programs to raise awareness and prevent cervical cancer

=== Europe ===
As of 2022, the World Health Organization announced that "each year in the WHO European Region, more than 66,000 women are newly diagnosed with cervical cancer and more than 30,000 die from this preventable disease." In the UK, cervical cancer is the 14th-most common cancer in women in the UK (around 3,300 women were diagnosed yearly in 2017–2019) and accounts for 1% of cancer deaths (around 890 died yearly in 2021–2023).

=== North America ===
An estimated 1,450 Canadians will be diagnosed with cervical cancer in 2022. An estimated 380 will die from it.

An estimated 13,360 new cervical cancers and 4,320 cervical cancer deaths will occur in the United States in 2025. The median age at diagnosis is 50. The rate of new cases in the United States was 7.7 per 100,000 women, based on rates from 2018 to 2022. Cervical cancer deaths decreased by approximately 74% in the 50 years leading up to 2010, largely due to widespread Pap test screening. The annual direct medical cost of cervical cancer prevention and treatment before the introduction of the HPV vaccine was estimated at $6 billion.

== History ==
- 400 BCE: Hippocrates noted that cervical cancer was incurable.
- 1925: Hinselmann invented the colposcope.
- 1928: Papanicolaou developed the Papanicolaou technique.
- 1941: Papanicolaou and Traut: Pap test screening began.
- 1946: Aylesbury spatula was developed to scrape the cervix, collecting the sample for the Pap test.
- 1951: First successful in-vitro cell line, HeLa, derived from biopsy of cervical cancer of Henrietta Lacks.
- 1976: Harald zur Hausen and Gisam found HPV DNA in cervical cancer and genital warts; Hausen later won the Nobel Prize for his work.
- 1988: Bethesda System for reporting Pap results was developed.
- 2006: First HPV vaccine was approved by the FDA.
- 2015: HPV vaccine shown to protect against infection at multiple body sites.
- 2018: Evidence for single-dose protection with HPV vaccine.

Epidemiologists working in the early 20th century noted that cervical cancer behaved like a sexually transmitted disease. In summary:

1. Cervical cancer was noted to be common in female sex workers.
2. It was rare in nuns, except for those who had been sexually active before entering the convent (Rigoni in 1841).
3. It was more common in the second wives of men whose first wives had died from cervical cancer.
4. It was rare in Jewish women.
5. In 1935, Syverton and Berry discovered a relationship between CRPV (Cottontail Rabbit Papillomavirus) and skin cancer in rabbits. (HPV is species-specific and therefore cannot be transmitted to rabbits).

These historical observations suggested a sexually transmitted agent caused cervical cancer. Initial research in the 1940s and 1950s attributed cervical cancer to smegma. During the 1960s and 1970s it was suspected that infection with herpes simplex virus (HSV) was the cause of the disease. In summary, HSV was seen as a likely cause because it is known to survive in the female reproductive tract, and to be transmitted sexually in a way compatible with known risk factors, such as promiscuity and low socioeconomic status. Herpes viruses were also implicated in other malignant diseases, including Burkitt's lymphoma, Nasopharyngeal carcinoma, Marek's disease and the Lucké renal adenocarcinoma. HSV was recovered from cervical tumour cells.

A description of human papillomavirus (HPV) by electron microscopy was given in 1949, and HPV-DNA was identified in 1963. It was not until the 1980s that HPV was identified in cervical cancer tissue. It has since been demonstrated that HPV is implicated in virtually all cervical cancers. Specific viral subtypes implicated are HPV 16, 18, 31, 45 and others.

In work that was initiated in the mid-1980s, the HPV vaccine was developed, in parallel, by researchers at Georgetown University Medical Center, the University of Rochester, the University of Queensland in Australia, and the U.S. National Cancer Institute. In 2006, the US Food and Drug Administration (FDA) approved the first preventive HPV vaccine, marketed by Merck & Co. under the trade name Gardasil.

The Cervical Cancer Elimination Day of Action is 17 November. The date marks the day in 2020 when the WHO launched the global strategy to accelerate the elimination of cervical cancer as a public health problem, with a resolution passed by 194 countries. In November 2020, the World Health Organization (WHO), under backing from the World Health Assembly, set out a strategy to eliminate cervical cancer by 2050. The strategy involves vaccinating 90% of girls by the age of 15, screening 70% of women by the age of 35 and again by the age of 45, and treating 90% of women identified with cervical disease. To eliminate cervical cancer, all countries must reach and maintain an incidence rate of below 4 per 100 000 women.

== Society and culture ==
=== Australia ===
In Australia, Aboriginal women are more than five times more likely to die from cervical cancer than non-Aboriginal women, suggesting that Aboriginal women are less likely to have regular Pap tests. Several factors may limit indigenous women from engaging in regular cervical screening practices, including sensitivity in discussing the topic in Aboriginal communities, embarrassment, anxiety and fear about the procedure. Difficulty in accessing screening services (for example, transport difficulties) and a lack of female GPs, trained Pap test providers and trained female Aboriginal Health Workers are also issues.

The Australian Cervical Cancer Foundation (ACCF), founded in 2008, promotes 'women's health by eliminating cervical cancer and enabling treatment for women with cervical cancer and related health issues, in Australia and in developing countries.' Ian Frazer, one of the developers of the Gardasil cervical cancer vaccine, is the scientific advisor to ACCF. Janette Howard, the wife of the then-Prime Minister of Australia, John Howard, was diagnosed with cervical cancer in 1996, and first spoke publicly about the disease in 2006.

=== United States ===
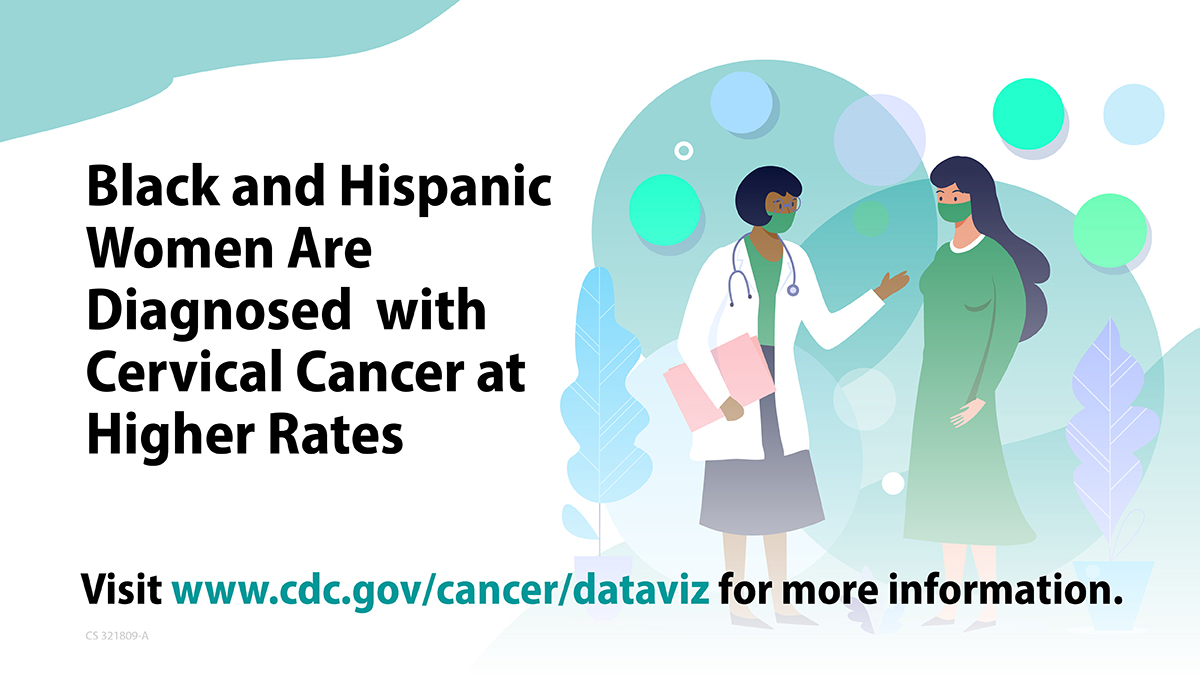
A Centers for Disease Control and Prevention public service announcement about cervical cancer health disparities in the United States

A 2007 survey of American women found 40% had heard of HPV infection, and less than half of those knew it causes cervical cancer. Over a longitudinal study from 1975 to 2000, it was found that people of lower socioeconomic census brackets had higher rates of late-stage cancer diagnosis and higher morbidity rates. After controlling for stage, there still existed differences in survival rates. Women in the US experience stigma around HPV infection, vaccination, and cervical cancer. This is predominantly driven by fear of social judgment and rejection, self-blame, and shame, with notable negative influences from gender and social norms, as both human papillomavirus infection and cervical cancer were stigmatized due to the perception that they arise from reckless behavior such as having multiple sexual partners or neglecting screening.

=== LGBTQ populations ===
Transgender men and gender-diverse people who have a cervix (even if partially intact) or have a prior history of cervical cancer or precancerous conditions, and are age 21 or older, who have ever had sex with anyone, need to get screened for cervical cancer. Transmasculine people are just as likely as cisgender women to have cervical cancer, but are less likely to undergo cervical screening, because of dysphoria, gender disaffirmation or disempowerment of the individual by healthcare providers, or being misinformed of HPV and cervical cancer risks as well as many healthcare providers perceiving transmasculine individuals to be at low risk of cervical cancer.

Transgender women who have not had bottom surgery have no risk of cervical cancer, as they do not have a cervix. Trans women who have had bottom surgery to create a vagina (vaginoplasty) and possibly a cervix, are at low risk to develop cancer in the tissues of their neo-vagina or neo-cervix as these tissues are made up of different cells than a cervix in a cisgender woman. Cervical cancer screening is not necessary in trans women who have undergone vaginoplasty because they do not have a cervix.

Intersex people with a cervix are also able to have cervical cancer.
