= Loop electrical excision procedure =

Surgical procedure to treat cervical dysplasia

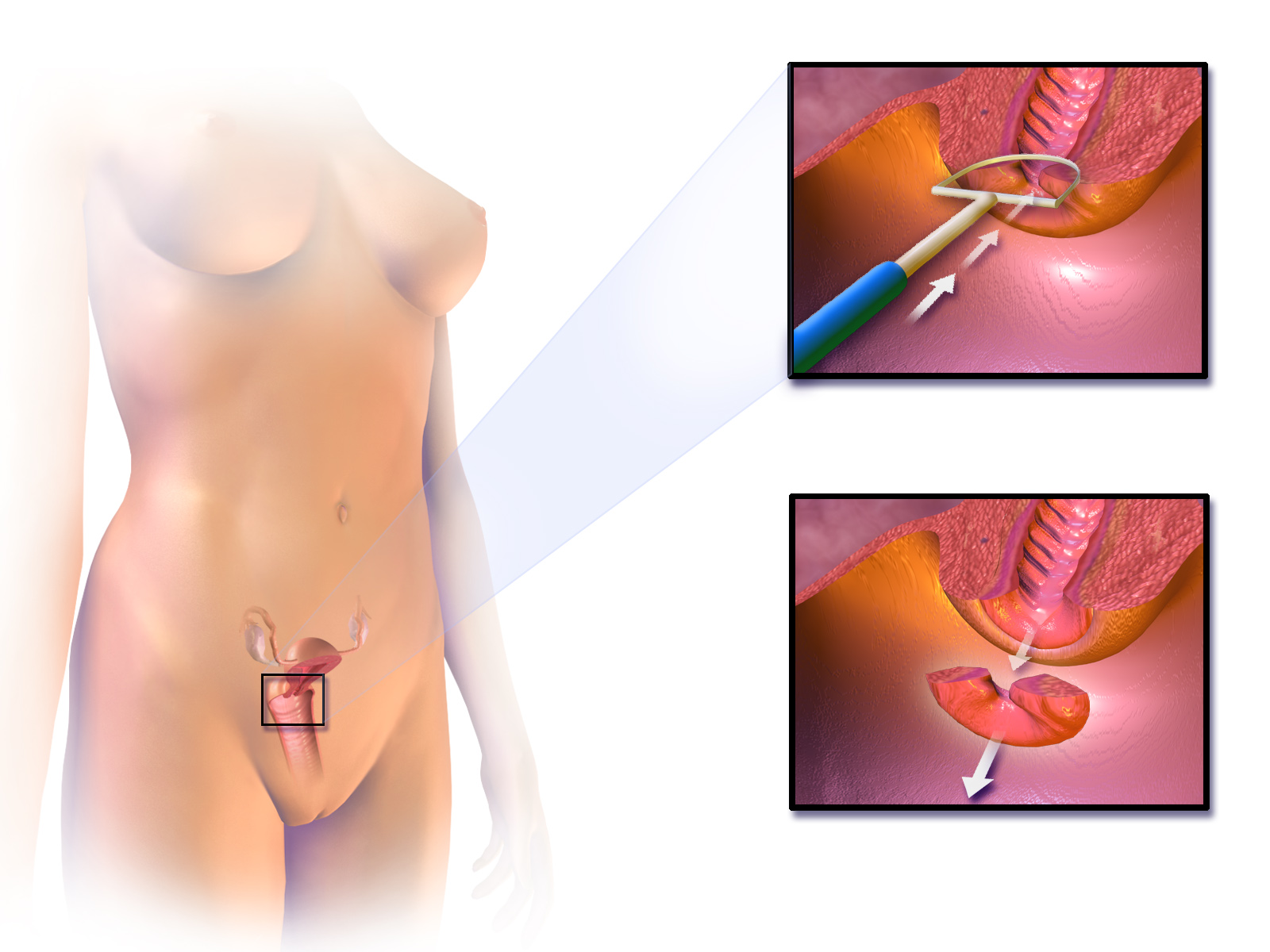
- Other names: Large loop excision of the transformation zone
- Specialty: Gynaecology

The loop electrosurgical excision procedure (LEEP) is one of the most commonly used approaches to treat high grade cervical dysplasia (CIN II/III, HGSIL) and early stage cervical cancer discovered on colposcopic examination. In the UK, it is known as large loop excision of the transformation zone (LLETZ). It is considered a type of conization. It has been in use since the 1970s, after its invention by Dr. Sheldon Weinstein.

LEEP has many advantages including low cost and a high success rate. The procedure can be done in an office setting and usually only requires a local anesthetic, though sometimes IV sedation or a general anesthetic is used. Disadvantages include reports of decreased sexual satisfaction and potential for preterm labor, though a meta-analysis published in 2014 suggested that in patients with existing CIN lesions as opposed to controls, the risk is not more than their baseline risk. Approximately 500,000 LEEP procedures are performed in the U.S. annually.

== Process ==
When performing a LEEP, the physician uses a wire loop through which an electric current is passed at variable power settings. Various shapes and sizes of loop can be used depending on the size and orientation of the lesion. The cervical transformation zone and lesion are excised to an adequate depth, which in most cases is at least 8 mm, and extending 4 to 5 mm beyond the lesion. A second pass with a more narrow loop can also be done to obtain an endocervical specimen for further histologic evaluation.

The LEEP technique results in some thermal artifact in all specimens obtained due to the use of electricity which simultaneously cuts and cauterizes the lesion, but this does not generally interfere with pathological interpretation provided depth is not exceeded. The thermal artifact can be a function of depth and time.

== Complications ==
Complications are less frequent in comparison to a cold-knife conization but can include infection and hemorrhage.

LEEP effectively reduces the risk of cancer developing or spreading but it causes an increased risk of premature birth in future pregnancies. Following LEEP there is a 10% chance of cancer recurrence and 11% chance of preterm birth. This perspective carries significant implications when it comes to pregnancy timing and decision making in women of child bearing age who have cervical dysplasia and would like to decide whether they should have the lesions removed before or after pregnancy. As pregnancy is generally understood to be an immune suppressed state, the viral mediated character of cervical lesions might also inform revisions to treatment recommendations in such instances.

Some women report a small decrease in sexual arousal and satisfaction following LEEP but there is a lack of high quality research showing how LEEP affects sexual function.

== See also ==
- Cervicectomy
