= Cervical conization =

- ICD-9-CM: 67.2

Cervical conization refers to an excision of a cone-shaped portion of tissue from the mucous membrane of the cervix. Conization is used for diagnostic purposes as part of a biopsy and for therapeutic purposes to remove pre-cancerous cells (cervical intraepithelial neoplasia) or early stage cervical cancer. Ablative treatments are also available to treat abnormal cervical cells. The decision to perform a cervical conization procedure is made with consideration of a patient's pap smear, colposcopy, and HPV test results. The American College of Obstetricians and Gynecologists (ACOG) recommends that decisions regarding excision should be based on the risk of CIN3+. A conization can be performed in the office or the operating room, depending on the type of conization performed. This procedure carries few risks, with the most common one being bleeding after the procedure.

== History ==
Before the introduction of the speculum, cervical cancer was only found once it was advanced. With the invention and use of a speculum, changes in the cervix could be appreciated. First, they were evaluated macroscopically and eventually were also assessed using a microscope. In 1927, H. Hinselmann discovered the transformation zone, where metaplastic squamous epithelium is found between the columnar epithelium of the endocervix and the squamous epithelium of the ectocervix. The transformation zone is clinically significant, as it is where almost all cervical cancers and precancerous lesions arise.

All current cervical conization methods can be traced back to amputation of the ectocervix, which was developed by Marion Sims in 1861. Before this, any excisions of cervical carcinomas were mainly a palliative care treatment option. A. Sturmdorf was the first to describe an excision of a cone shape from the ectocervix; however, he utilized this as a treatment for cervicitis. J. E. Ayre was the first to introduce cold knife conization in 1948 and stressed the importance of evaluating the excised tissue in serial sections to assess the extent of invasion. This method of cold knife conization has been utilized, and eventually, options for excisions using electrocautery were developed as well. Initially, excised tissue utilizing electrocautery was not satisfactory for evaluation, but as the loops used have become finer, the quality of the surgical specimens has improved to rival those of cold knife conization. Presently, electrocautery methods are often preferred to cold knife conization due to the greater ease of procedure.

== Anatomy ==
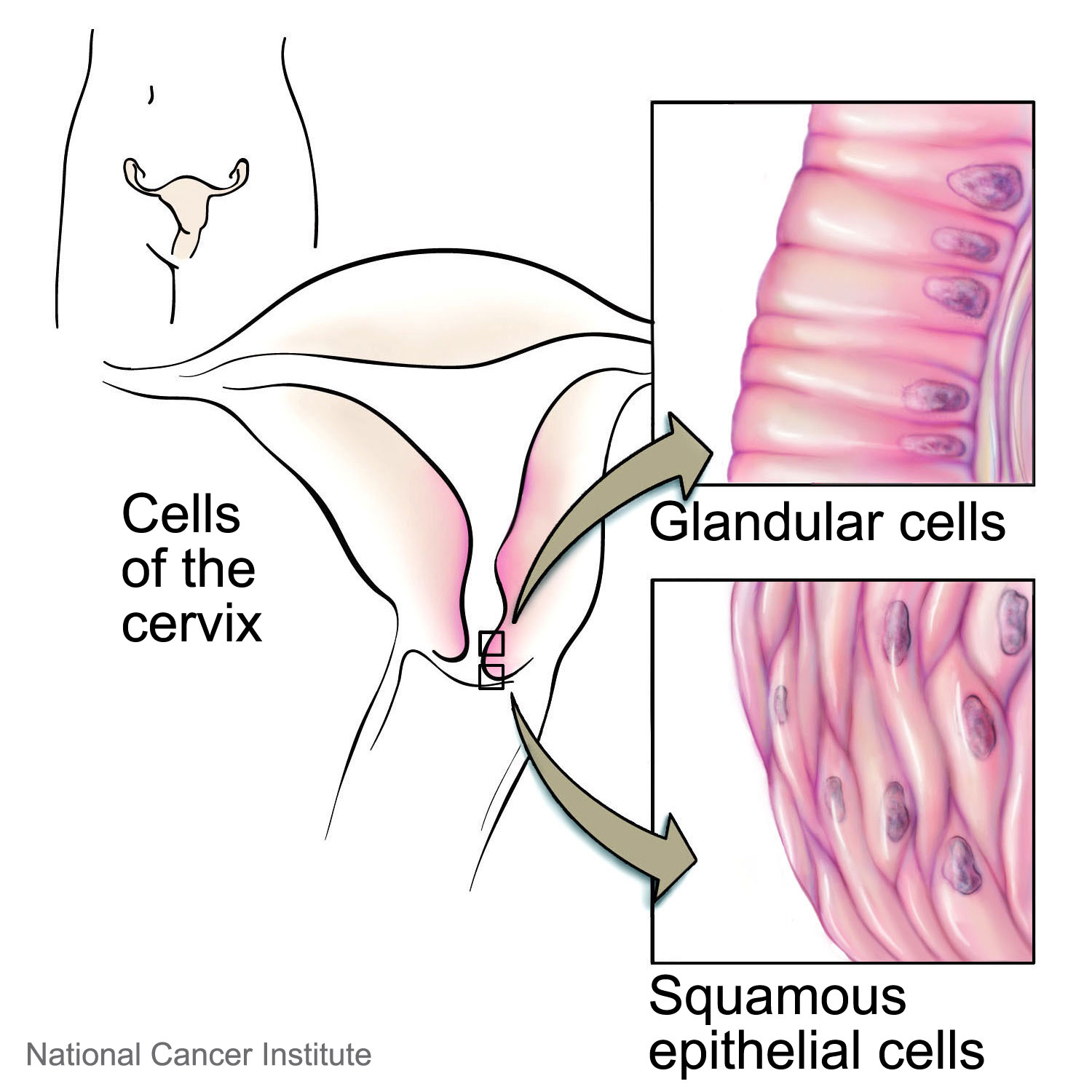
Photo illustrating the different cell types located in the cervix

Image shows relevant anatomy and the transformation zone.

The cervix connects the uterine cavity to the vagina. The cervix can be viewed by placing a speculum in the vagina. The part of the cervix that can be directly viewed upon placing a speculum in the vagina is the ectocervix. The beginning of the endocervix is called the cervical os. The endocervix leads from the vagina into the uterine cavity. The area where the columnar epithelium of the endocervix and the squamous epithelium of the ectocervix meet is called the transformation zone or the squamocolumnar junction (SCJ). This is the area of the cervix that is most susceptible to human papillomavirus (HPV) infection and is where the vast majority of cervical precancers and cancers arise. This is the tissue that is sampled during a pap smear as a screening test to find abnormal cells or the presence of an HPV infection.

== Types ==
Types of conization include:

- Cold knife conization (CKC)
- Loop electrical excision procedure (LEEP)

== Indications ==
Abnormal cervical cells found on pap smear and colposcopy are the basis for the recommendation of a conization procedure. The amount of irregularity will be graded by the pathologist after the colposcopy as CIN1, CIN2, or CIN3. CIN3 represents the most irregularly appearing cells of the possible grading options. Conization may be recommended once the risk of CIN3 is greater than 25%. Conization before a radical hysterectomy is associated with better outcomes for early -stage cervical cancers as well, so it may be recommended even when hysterectomy will be the definitive surgical option. The American Society for Colposcopy and Cervical Pathology has developed a tool to aid in decision -making with abnormal cervical cancer screening and abnormal colposcopy results.

== Procedure ==
Cervical Conization surgical sample with sections showing how it will be analyzed

The vagina is prepped using antimicrobial scrub or iodine. Draping is placed to maintain a sterile surgical field. Some physicians may choose to drain the bladder using a catheter. The speculum will be placed, and the cervix visualized. The tissue is then excised from the cervix. The tissue will include the transformation zone and will be shaped like a cone, as the procedure name suggests. The physician will ensure hemostasis has been achieved before removing the speculum and ending the procedure. Typically, the physician will place a suture at the 12 o'clock position of the excised tissue to serve as a reference point during histological examination.

The main difference between cold knife conization and LEEP is the instrument used to excise the tissue. In a LEEP, a thin wire loop electrode is used to remove the cone-shaped surgical specimen. During a cold knife cone, a scalpel is used to excise the tissue. Both LEEP and cold knife cone have shown equal effectiveness, so the decision for which procedure is often based on the physician's comfort with each procedure or other clinical considerations. Cold knife cone is performed with a scalpel, and one advantage of this procedure is that the margins of the excised tissue will be free from thermal damage that would be present in the excised tissue from a LEEP. This can allow for more accurate analysis of the margin of the specimen.

Contraindications to completing the procedure are cervicitis, pelvic inflammatory disease, or anticoagulation. Pregnancy is a relative contraindication, meaning that decisions of whether to perform the procedure in pregnant patients would be made on an individual basis.

After treatment, screenings will continue. HPV screening is recommended 6 months after conization. Regular cervical cancer screening will resume as well, with the schedule of screening being determined by the type of abnormal cells that were present in the cervix. HPV vaccination may also be recommended as a part of the treatment plan to reduce the chances of abnormal cervical cells developing again.

== Complications ==
The most common complication of cervical conization is bleeding during the procedure or within a few weeks after the procedure. Infection after the procedure is possible but very rare. There is the possibility of cervical stenosis or cervical insufficiency. The data regarding the risk of preterm birth and low birth weight in future pregnancies is mixed; however, it is generally accepted that for patients desiring to carry future pregnancies, limiting the amount of cervical tissue that is excised is the best option to limit this risk. However, taking less tissue does produce an increased risk that the margins of the excised specimen will be positive, so the decision on how aggressively the excision is performed must be discussed between the patient and physician.

Cervical conization effectively reduces the risk of cancer developing or spreading. The chances of cancer recurrence and premature birth depend on the type of conization. Cold knife conization is associated with 7% chance of the cancer recurring and a 16% chance of premature birth, laser conization comes with 6% cancer recurrence and 13% premature birth, and loop excision comes with a 10% recurrence and 11% premature birth.

== See also ==
- Cervicectomy
