= Vulvar tumors =

Neoplasm of the vulva

Vulvar tumors are those neoplasms of the vulva. Vulvar and vaginal neoplasms make up a small percentage (3%) of female genital cancers. They can be benign or malignant (vulvar cancer). Vulvar neoplasms are divided into cystic or solid lesions and other mixed types. Vulvar cancers are those malignant neoplasms that originate from vulvar epithelium, while vulvar sarcomas develop from non-epithelial cells such as bone, cartilage, fat, muscle, blood vessels, or other connective or supportive tissue. Epithelial and mesenchymal tissue are the origin of vulvar tumors.

Malignant vulvar neoplasms makes up 6% of all reproductive organ cancer and 0.7% of the total cancers in women in the United States. One out of every 333 women will develop vulvar cancer. In the United States, vulvar cancer accounts for nearly 6% of cancers of the female reproductive organs and 0.7% of all cancers in women. In 2018, there were 5,496 women diagnosed with cancer of the vulva and 1,316 women who died from it. Malignant vulvar tumors can develop in the inner edges of the labia majora, labia minora, clitoris or in the Bartholin glands. Research in preventing vulvar cancers includes investigations into the use of oncogenes, tumor suppressor genes, drug treatments, surgery, radiation therapy, chemotherapy, and lymph node mapping.

== Epithelial neoplasms ==
=== Squamous tumors precursors ===
- Squamous cell carcinoma not otherwise specified
- Basal cell carcinoma
- Squamous intraepithelial neoplasia
- Benign squamous lesions

=== Glandular tumors ===
- Paget disease
- Bartholin gland tumors: carcinomas, adenoma and adenomyoma
- Tumor arising from specialized ano-genital mammary-like glands
- Adenocarcinoma of Shene gland origin
- Adenocarcinoma of other types
- Adenoma of minor vestibular glands
- Mixed tumors of the vulva
- Tumors of skin appendage origin

=== Soft tissue tumors ===
- Embryonal rhabdomyosarcoma (sarcoma botryoides)
- Leiomyosarcoma
- Fibrous histiocytoma
- Proximal epithelioid sarcoma
- Alveolar soft part sarcoma
- Liposarcoma
- Dermatofibrosarcoma protuberans
- Deep angiomyxoma
- Superficial angiomyxoma
- Angiomyofibroblastoma
- Cellular angiofibroma
- Leiomyoma
- Granular cell tumor

=== Melanocytic tumors ===
- Malignant melanoma
- Congenital melanocytic naevus
- Acquired melanocytic naevus
- Blue naevus
- Atypical melanocytic naevus of genital type
- Dysplastic melanocytic naevus

=== Other ===
- Yolk sac tumor
- Merkel cell tumor
- Peripheral primitive neuroectodermal tumor/Ewing sarcoma

=== Haematopoietic and lymphoid tumors ===
- Malignant lymphoma
- Leukemia

=== Secondary tumors ===
Source:

=== Benign cystic lesions ===
- Bartholin duct cysts and abscesses
- Skene duct cyst
- Mucinous cyst
- Ciliated cyst
- Gartner duct cyst
- Cyst of the canal of Nuck
- Perineal hernia

==== Solid lesions ====
- Epithelial lesions
- Acrochordons, fibroepithelial polyps
- Nevus
- Seborrheic keratosis
- Adenosis
- Syringoma
- Hidradenoma papilliferum
- Anogential mammary-like glands

==== Mesenchymal and other subcutaneious lesions ====
- Endometriosis
- Hemangioma
- Fibroma
- Lipoma
- Granular cell tumor
- Leiomyoma
- Angiomyofibroblastoma
- Aggressive angiomyxoma
- Teratoma
- Osteochondroma
- Neurofibroma
- Schwannoma
- Perineal nodular induration
- Epidermal inclusion cyst

== See also ==
- Urethral caruncle
- Vaginal cysts
- Vaginal intraepithelial neoplasia
