= Vaginal epithelium =

Inner lining of the vagina

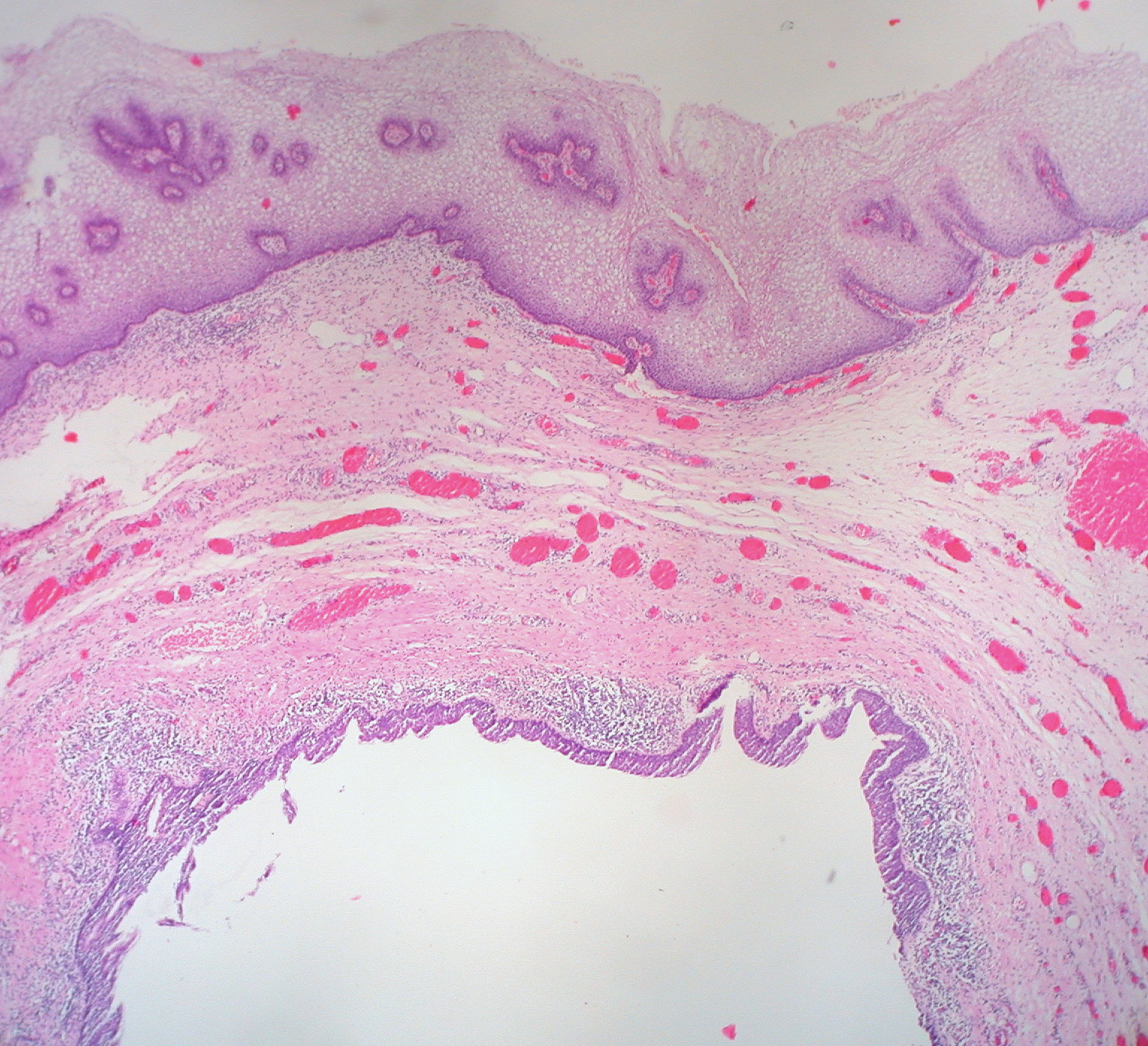
- The epithelium of the vagina, visible at top, consists of multiple layers of flat cells.

Details
- Part of: Vagina

The vaginal epithelium is the inner lining of the vagina consisting of multiple layers of (squamous) cells. The basal membrane provides the support for the first layer of the epithelium-the basal layer. The intermediate layers lie upon the basal layer, and the superficial layer is the outermost layer of the epithelium. Anatomists have described the epithelium as consisting of as many as 40 distinct layers of cells. The mucus found on the epithelium is secreted by the cervix and uterus. The rugae of the epithelium create an involuted surface and result in a large surface area that covers 360 cm^{2}. This large surface area allows the trans-epithelial absorption of some medications via the vaginal route.

In the course of the reproductive cycle, the vaginal epithelium is subject to normal, cyclic changes, that are influenced by estrogen: with increasing circulating levels of the hormone, there is proliferation of epithelial cells along with an increase in the number of cell layers. As cells proliferate and mature, they undergo partial cornification. Although hormone induced changes occur in the other tissues and organs of the female reproductive system, the vaginal epithelium is more sensitive and its structure is an indicator of estrogen levels. Some Langerhans cells and melanocytes are also present in the epithelium. The epithelium of the ectocervix is contiguous with that of the vagina, possessing the same properties and function. The vaginal epithelium is divided into layers of cells, including the basal cells, the parabasal cells, the superficial squamous flat cells, and the intermediate cells. The superficial cells exfoliate continuously, and basal cells replace the superficial cells that die and slough off from the stratum corneum. Under the stratus corneum is the stratum granulosum and stratum spinosum. The cells of the vaginal epithelium retain a usually high level of glycogen compared to other epithelial tissue in the body. The surface patterns on the cells themselves are circular and arranged in longitudinal rows. The epithelial cells of the uterus possess some of the same characteristics of the vaginal epithelium.

== Structure ==
Vaginal epithelium forms transverse ridges or rugae that are most prominent in the lower third of the vagina. This structure of the epithelium results in an increased surface area that allows for stretching. This layer of epithelium is protective, and its uppermost surface of cornified (dead) cells are unique in that they are permeable to microorganisms that are part of the vaginal flora. The lamina propria of connective tissue is under the epithelium.

=== Cells ===
cell type	Features	Diameter	Nuclei	Notes
basal cell	round to cylindrical, narrow basophilic cytoplasmic space	12-14 μm	distinct, 8–10 μm in size	only in case of severe epithelial atrophy and in repair processes after inflammation
stratum granulosum	part of the parabasal layer, round to longitudinal oval, cytoplasm basophilic	20 μm	clear cell nucleus	Frequent glycogen storage, thickened cell margins and decentralized cell nucleus; Predominant cell type in menopausal women
stratum spinosum	part of the parabasal layer			
intermediate cell	oval to polygonal, cytoplasm basophilic	30–50 μm	approx. 8 μm, decreasing core-plasma relation with increase in size	in pregnancy: barge-like with thickened cell margin ("navicular cells")
superficial squamous flat cells	polygonal, baso- or eosinophilic, transparent, partially keratohyaline granule	50–60 microns	vesicular and slightly stainable or shrunken	
stratum corneum	exfoliate, slough off		become detached from the epithelium	

=== Basal cells ===
The basal layer of the epithelium is the most mitotically active and reproduces new cells. This layer is composed of one layer of cuboidal cells lying on top of the basal membrane.

=== Parabasal cells ===
The parabasal cells include the stratum granulosum and the stratum spinosum. In these two layers, cells from the lower basal layer transition from active metabolic activity to death (apoptosis). In these mid-layers of the epithelia, the cells begin to lose their mitochondria and other cell organelles. The multiple layers of parabasal cells are polyhedral in shape with prominent nuclei.

=== Intermediate cells ===
Intermediate cells make abundant glycogen and store it. Estrogen induces the intermediate and superficial cells to fill with glycogen. The intermediate cells contain nuclei and are larger than the parabasal cells and more flattened. Some have identified a transitional layer of cells above the intermediate layer.

=== Superficial cells ===
Estrogen induces the intermediate and superficial cells to fill with glycogen. Several layers of superficial cells exist that consist of large, flattened cells with indistinct nuclei. The superficial cells are exfoliated continuously.

=== Cell junctions ===
The junctions between epithelial cells regulate the passage of molecules, bacteria and viruses by functioning as a physical barrier. The three types of structural adhesions between epithelial cells are: tight junctions, adherens junctions, and desmosomes. "Tight junctions (zonula occludens) are composed of transmembrane proteins that make contact across the intercellular space and create a seal to restrict transmembrane proteins difusion. of molecules across the epithelial sheet. Tight junctions also have an organizing role in epithelial polarization by limiting the mobility of membrane-bound molecules between the apical and basolateral domains of the plasma membrane of each epithelial cell. Adherens junctions (zonula adherens) connect bundles of actin filaments from cell to cell to form a continuous adhesion belt, usually just below the microfilaments." Junction integrity changes as the cells move to the upper layers of the epidermis.

=== Mucus ===
The vagina itself does not contain mucous glands. Though mucus is not produced by the vaginal epithelium, mucus originates from the cervix. The cervical mucus that is located inside the vagina can be used to assess fertility in ovulating women. The Bartholin's glands and Skene's glands located at the entrance of the vagina do produce mucus.

== Development ==
The epithelium of the vagina originates from three different precursors during embryonic and fetal development. These are the vaginal squamous epithelium of the lower vagina, the columnar epithelium of the endocervix, and the squamous epithelium of the upper vagina. The distinct origins of vaginal epithelium may impact the understanding of vaginal anomalies. Vaginal adenosis is a vaginal anomaly traced to displacement of normal vaginal tissue by other reproductive tissue within the muscular layer and epithelium of the vaginal wall. This displaced tissue often contains glandular tissue and appears as a raised, red surface.

== Cyclic variations ==
During the luteal and follicular phases of the estrous cycle the structure of the vaginal epithelium varies. The number of cell layers vary during the days of the estrous cycle:

Day 10, 22 layers

Days 12-14, 46 layers

Day 19, 32 layers

Day 24, 24 layers

The glycogen levels in the cells is at its highest immediately before ovulation.

== Lytic cells ==
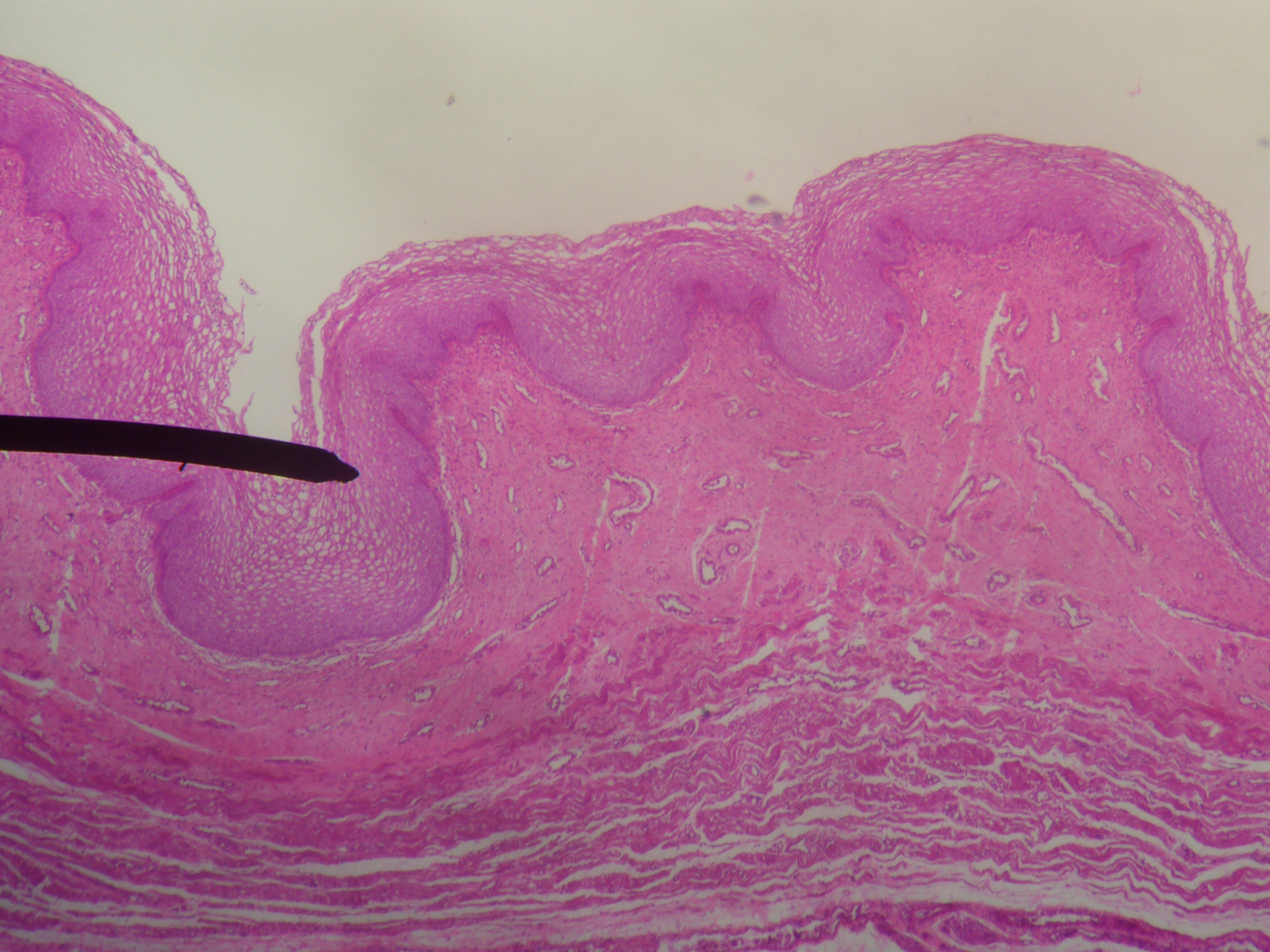
Different layers of the vaginal epithelium

Without estrogen, the vaginal epithelium is only a few layers thick. Only small round cells are seen that originate directly from the basal layer (basal cells) or the cell layers (parabasal cells) above it. The parabasal cells, which are slightly larger than the basal cells, form a five- to ten-layer cell layer. The parabasal cells can also differentiate into histiocytes or glandular cells. Estrogen also influences the changing ratios of nuclear constituents to cytoplasm. As a result of cell aging, cells with shrunken, seemingly foamy cell nuclei (intermediate cells) develop from the parabasal cells. These can be categorized by means of the nuclear-plasma relation into "upper" and "deep" intermediate cells. Intermediate cells make abundant glycogen and store it. The further nuclear shrinkage and formation of mucopolysaccharides are distinct characteristics of superficial cells. The mucopolysaccharides form a keratin-like cell scaffold. Fully keratinized cells without a nucleus are called "floes". Intermediate and superficial cells are constantly exfoliated from the epithelium. The glycogen from these cells is converted to sugars and then fermented by the bacteria of the vaginal flora to lactic acid. The cells progress through the cell cycle and then decompose (cytolysis) within a week's time. Cytolysis occurs only in the presence of glycogen-containing cells, that is, when the epithelium is degraded to the upper intermediate cells and superficial cells. In this way, the cytoplasm is dissolved, while the cell nuclei remain.

== Epithelial microbiota ==
Glycogen is the complex form of sugar present in the vaginal epithelium that is metabolized into lactic acid

Low pH is necessary to control vaginal microbiota. Vaginal epithelial cells have a relatively high concentration of glycogen compared to other epithelial cells of the human body. The metabolism of this complex sugar by the lactobacillus dominated microbiome is responsible for vaginal acidity.

== Function ==
The cellular junctions of the vaginal epithelium help prevent pathogenic microorganisms from entering the body though some are still able to penetrate this barrier. Cells of the cervix and vaginal epithelium generate a mucous barrier (glycocalyx) in which immune cells reside. In addition, white blood cells provide additional immunity and are able to infiltrate and move through the vaginal epithelium. The epithelium is permeable to antibodies, other immune system cells, and macromolecules. The permeability of epithelium thus provides access for these immune system components to prevent the passage of invading pathogens into deeper vaginal tissue. The epithelium further provides a barrier to microbes by the synthesis of antimicrobial peptides (beta-defensins and cathelicidins) and immunoglobulins. Terminally differentiated, superficial keratinocytes extrude the contents of lamellar bodies out of the cell to form a specialized, intercellular lipid envelope that encases the cells of the epidermis and provides a physical barrier to microorganisms.

== Clinical significance ==
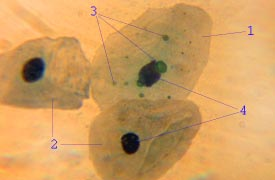
Vaginal epithelial cells containing chlamydia bacteria

=== Disease transmission ===
Sexually transmitted infections, including HIV are rarely transmitted across intact and healthy epithelium. These protective mechanisms are due to frequent exfoliation of the superficial cells, low pH, and innate and acquired immunity in the tissue. Research into the protective nature of the vaginal epithelium has been recommended as it would help in the design of topical medication and microbicides.

=== Cancer ===
There are very rare malignant growths that can originate in the vaginal epithelium. Some are only known through case studies. They are more common in older women.

- Vaginal squamous-cell carcinoma arises from the squamous cells of the epithelium.
- Vaginal adenocarcinoma arises from secretory cells in the epithelium
- Clear cell adenocarcinoma of the vagina arises in response to prenatal exposure to diethylstilbestrol
- Vaginal melanoma arises from melanocytes in the epithelium

=== Inflammation ===
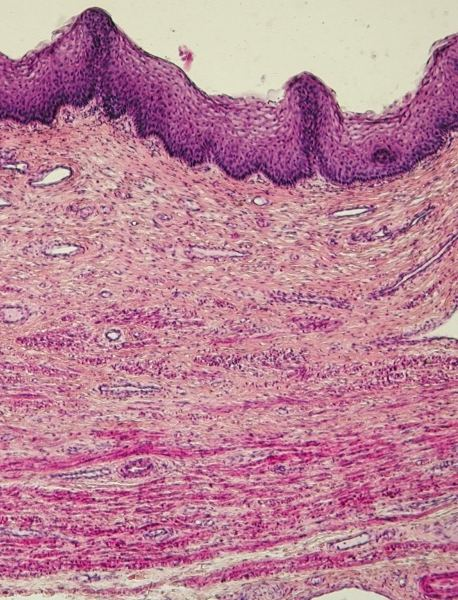
Cross section of vaginal epithelium in a post-menopausal woman

- Candida vaginitis is a fungal infection; the discharge is irritating to the vagina and the surrounding skin.
- Bacterial vaginosis Gardnerella usually causes a discharge, itching, and irritation.
- Aerobic vaginitis thinned reddish vaginal epithelium, sometimes with erosions or ulcerations and abundant yellowish discharge

=== Atrophy ===
The vaginal epithelium changes significantly when estrogen levels decrease at menopause. Atrophic vaginitis usually causes scant odorless discharge

== History ==
The vaginal epithelium has been studied since 1910 by a number of histologists.

== Research ==
The use of nanoparticles that can penetrate the cervical mucus (present in the vagina) and vaginal epithelium has been investigated to determine if medication can be administered in this manner to provide protection from infection of the Herpes simplex virus. Nanoparticle drug administration into and through the vaginal epithelium to treat HIV infection is also being investigated.

== See also ==
- Vaginal cysts
- Vaginal tumors
