= Pseudopregnancy =

Fetus-free apparent pregnancy

In mammalian species, pseudopregnancy is a physical state whereby all the signs and symptoms of pregnancy are exhibited, with the exception of the presence of a fetus, creating a false pregnancy. The corpus luteum (the remains of an ovulated ovarian follicle) is responsible for the development of maternal behavior and lactation, which are mediated by the continued production of progesterone by the corpus luteum through some or all of pregnancy. In most species, the corpus luteum is degraded in the absence of a pregnancy. However, in some species, the corpus luteum may persist in the absence of pregnancy and cause "pseudopregnancy", in which the female will exhibit clinical signs of pregnancy.

The mechanism is not well understood, but prolactin and its receptors are known to be involved in pseudopregnancy. The role of prolactin in maintaining pseudopregnancy is evident. For instance in the rodent, if chronic prolactin is administered the pseudopregnancy will continue, whereas the condition only lasts a few days if not administered.

== Cats ==
Pseudopregnancy occurs when a female cat ovulates but is not fertilised due to breeding with an infertile male, spontaneous ovulation or due to the owner stimulating ovulation. The corpus luteum is present after ovulation and persists for around 37 days. The length of pseudopregnancy varies greatly with the mean duration being 41 days. After pseudopregnancy, the female cat returns to proestrus and can become pregnant again. The pseudopregnancy lasts around half the length of a normal pregnancy in cats. This is advantageous to cats as they can conceive earlier making them more efficient in reproduction.

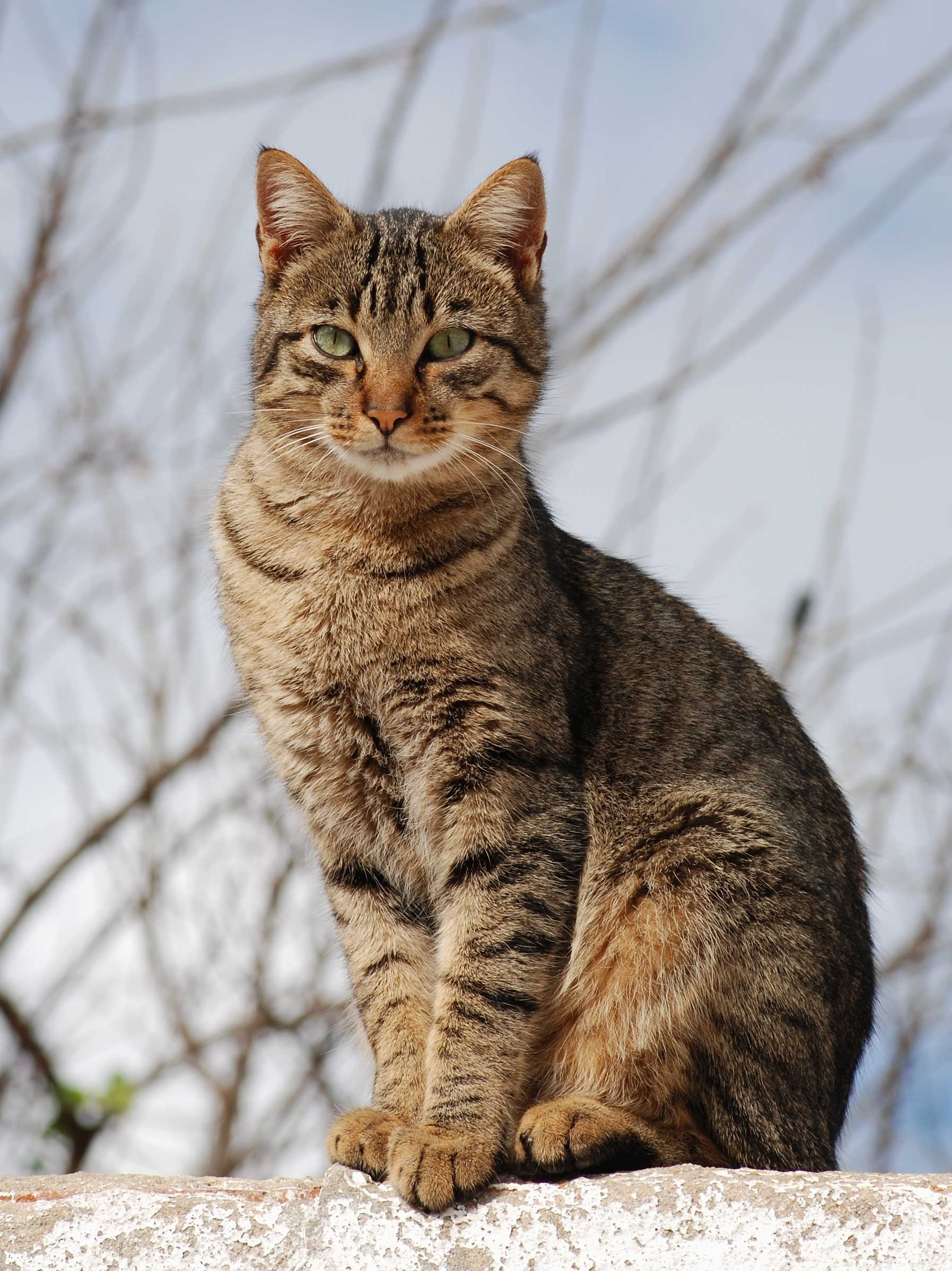
Cat

Cats become pseudopregnant following an estrus in which the queen is bred by an infertile male. Queens are induced ovulators, meaning that they will only ovulate and produce a corpus luteum if they are bred. The corpus luteum persists as if the queen were pregnant because the queen's body cannot distinguish between the pregnant and non-pregnant state (aside from the initial mechanical trigger of coitus). Pseudopregnant queens rarely show any mammary enlargement or behavioral signs and therefore rarely require treatment. Pseudopregnancy in cats is uncommon as the queen must be bred by an infertile male to become pseudopregnant, compounded by the fact that cats are seasonal breeders.

The progesterone and estradiol profiles in pseudopregnancy are very different when compared to normal pregnancy. During pseudopregnancy, estradiol increases straight after mating and then decreases to normal levels. The amount of progesterone does not increase until 2–3 days post copulation, then the level rises until day 21 post copulation where after it gradually declines to normal levels.

== Dogs ==
Pseudopregnancy is a normal physiologic process that occurs in female dogs. It is seen 45–60 days after a normal estrous (heat) period. After ovulation, progesterone levels rise. Pseudopregnancy happens when the progesterone levels begin to fall as decreasing progesterone leads to an increase of the hormone prolactin. Prolactin is responsible for the behaviours seen during pseudopregnancy. Dogs may exhibit mothering of toys, nesting or aggression. Mammary development and milk production are common. Pseudopregnancy can also be acutely induced by spaying (removing of ovaries) a dog near the end of estrus. Spaying removes the source of progesterone and induces a rise in prolactin.

Permanent prevention of pseudopregnancy is accomplished with spaying.

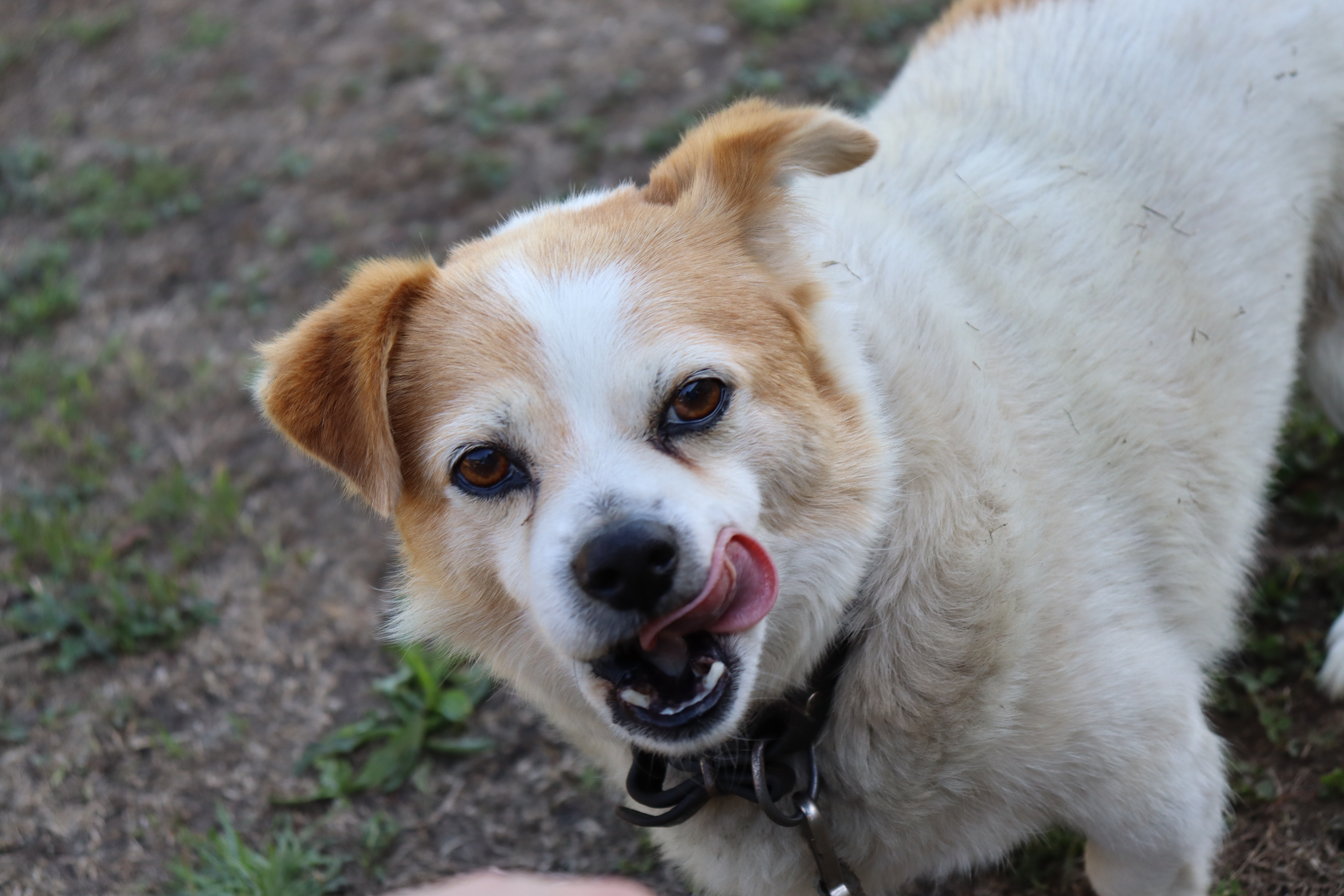
Dog

Dogs become pseudopregnant following an estrus phase in which the female dog is not bred, or in which she is bred by an infertile male. Most species require signals from an embryo (such as IFN-τ in ruminants) to alert the female's body of a pregnancy. This maternal recognition of pregnancy will cause persistence of the corpus luteum and the development of characteristics and behaviors necessary to care for offspring. Recent research suggests that progesterone secretion is similar in pregnant and non-pregnant female dogs, so veterinary researchers hypothesize that they may not require molecular factors from the embryo for maternal recognition of pregnancy, and instead the corpus luteum persists regardless of pregnancy. Since the corpus luteum is not degraded, it will cause the development of maternal characteristics in the absence of pregnancy. Pseudopregnant dogs will develop their mammary glands, lactate, and build nests to varying degrees depending on breed. Although female dogs usually only cycle once or twice per year, pseudopregnancy is common.

== Swine ==
Pseudopregnancy or "not-in-pig" is a condition that occurs when females exhibit physiological and behavioral signs associated with pregnancy, but there are no fetuses present. Pseudopregnancy can occur when all of the embryos are resorbed after the maternal recognition of pregnancy (days 10–15 postmating) and before fetal bone calcification (days 35–40 of gestation). The sow remains in anoestrus for prolonged periods, often as long as 115 days. These animals may exhibit varying degrees of udder development, but fail to deliver any pigs. The timely identification and removal of non-pregnant females from the breeding herd is important because it reduces both non-productive sow days and production costs.

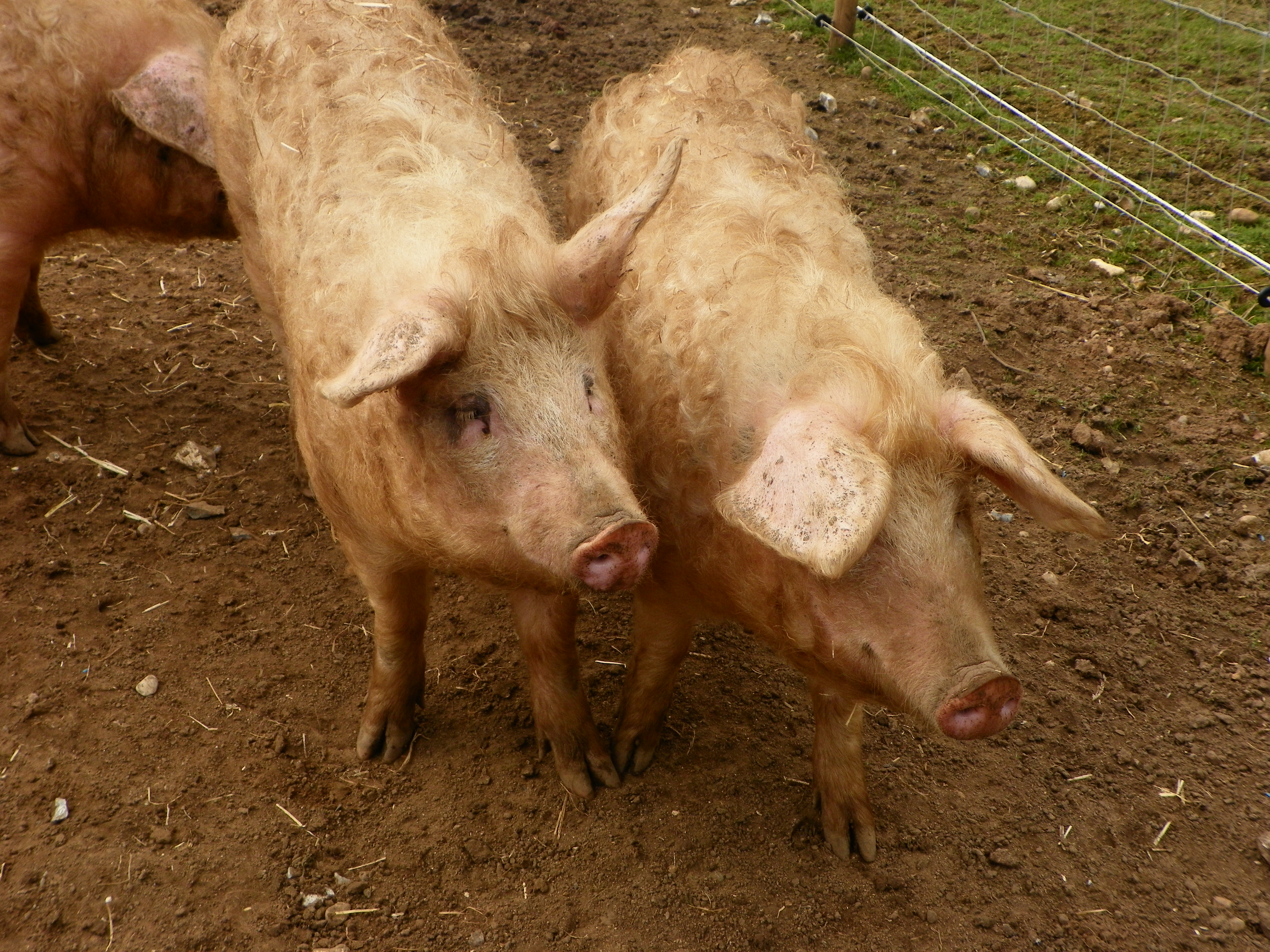
Swine

Techniques used for pregnancy diagnosis in swine include ultrasonography, amplitude depth machines, and Doppler machines.

Mycotoxins have been shown to be detrimental to sows and gilts by causing the female to retain a corpora lutea inhibiting cyclicity and causing a pseudopregnancy; as well as a constant exhibition of estrus, and infertility. Pregnant females produce litters that result in a higher number of stillborns, mummified fetuses, and abortions. Before breeding, ingesting mycotoxins mimics the action of estradiol-17β. Specifically, zearalenone binds to estrogenic receptors that would normally bind to estrogen, causing the female to exhibit constant estrus.

== Rats ==
The initiation of pseudopregnancy is basically similar to the pregnancy regarding the activation of progestational state. The neuroendocrine pathway of pseudopregnancy in rats is mainly initiated by the nocturnal surge of prolactin. The hormone prolactin produced regulates the activation and early maintenance of corpus luteum. The corpus luteum is known as a site of progesterone production in order for the uterus undergoes a decidual process. There are two types of induced pseudopregnancy; coitally induced pseudopregnancy and non-coitally induced pseudopregnancy.

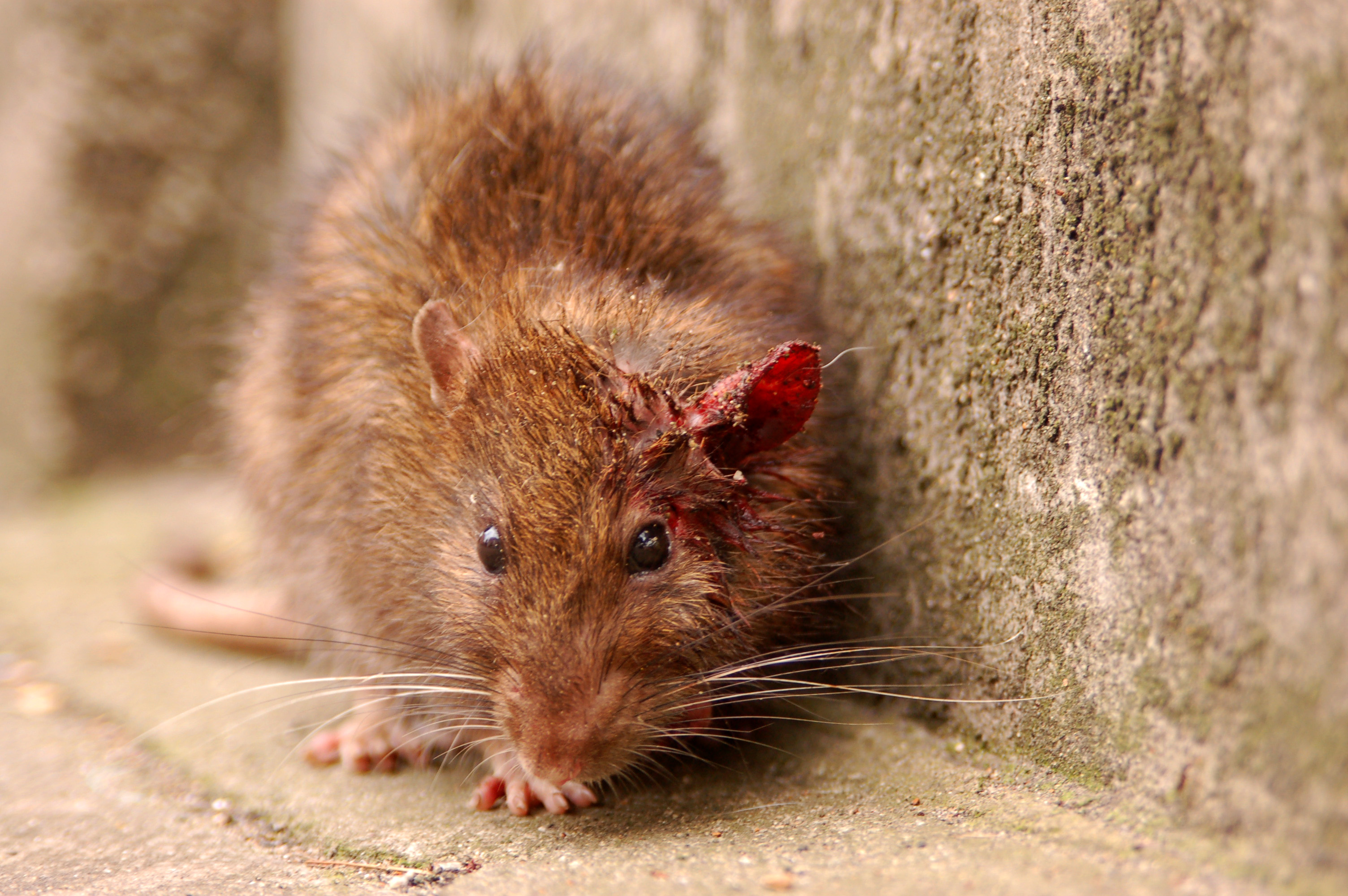
Rat

The coitally induced pseudopregnancy is stimulated by the action of copulation. The copulation stimulation causes the nocturnal prolactin elevation which then activates the corpus luteum. The multiple intromission coital pattern initiates the neuroendocrine reflex which results in the sufficient progesterone secretion in pseudopregnancy. However, induction of pseudopregnancy requires adrenergic system to be activated and simultaneously inhibits the cholinergic system.

The non-coitally induced pseudopregnancy requires the presence of the initial stimulus until the levels of progesterone are sufficiently elevated to produce positive feedback on secretion of prolactin. The initial stimulus can be in a form of some socio-environmental factors, such as concaveation with foster pups in virgin rats or cohabitation in all-female groups in mice.

== Mice ==
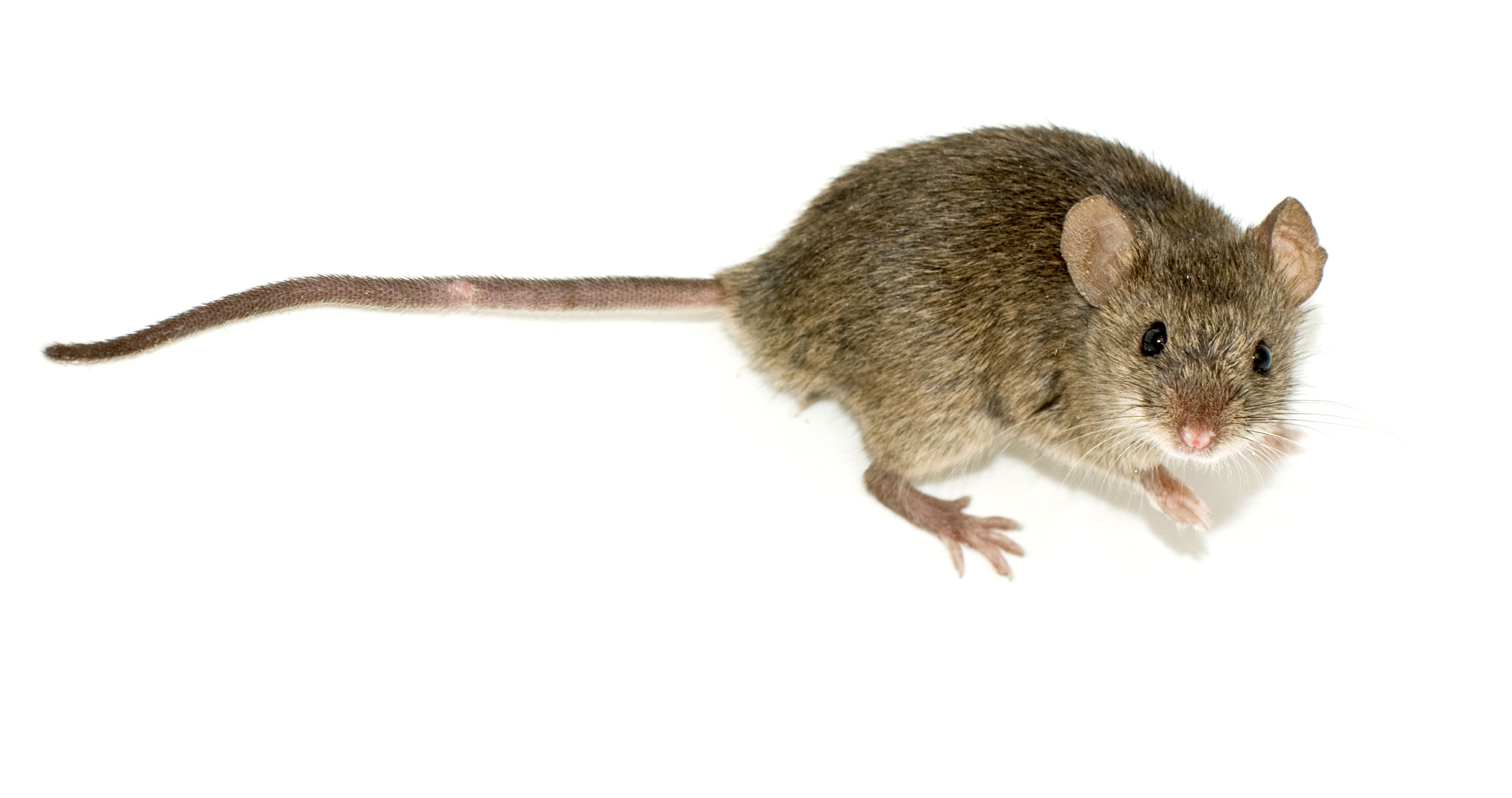
Mouse

Mice become pseudopregnant following an estrus in which the female is bred by an infertile male, resulting in sterile mating. Like dogs, mice are spontaneous ovulators. However, they will not become pseudopregnant following an estrus in which the female does not mate because the corpus luteum will degrade rapidly in the absence of coitus. When the female is mated by an infertile male, the corpus luteum persists without an embryo, leading to pseudopregnancy. The female will develop mammary glands, lactate, and build nests in the pseudopregnant state. Pseudopregnancy in mice is somewhat common in laboratory mice because it is often induced for the purpose of implanting embryos into a surrogate dam, but is uncommon in wild mice because most wild males are fertile and will genuinely impregnate the female.
