= Vaginal rugae =

Anatomical structure

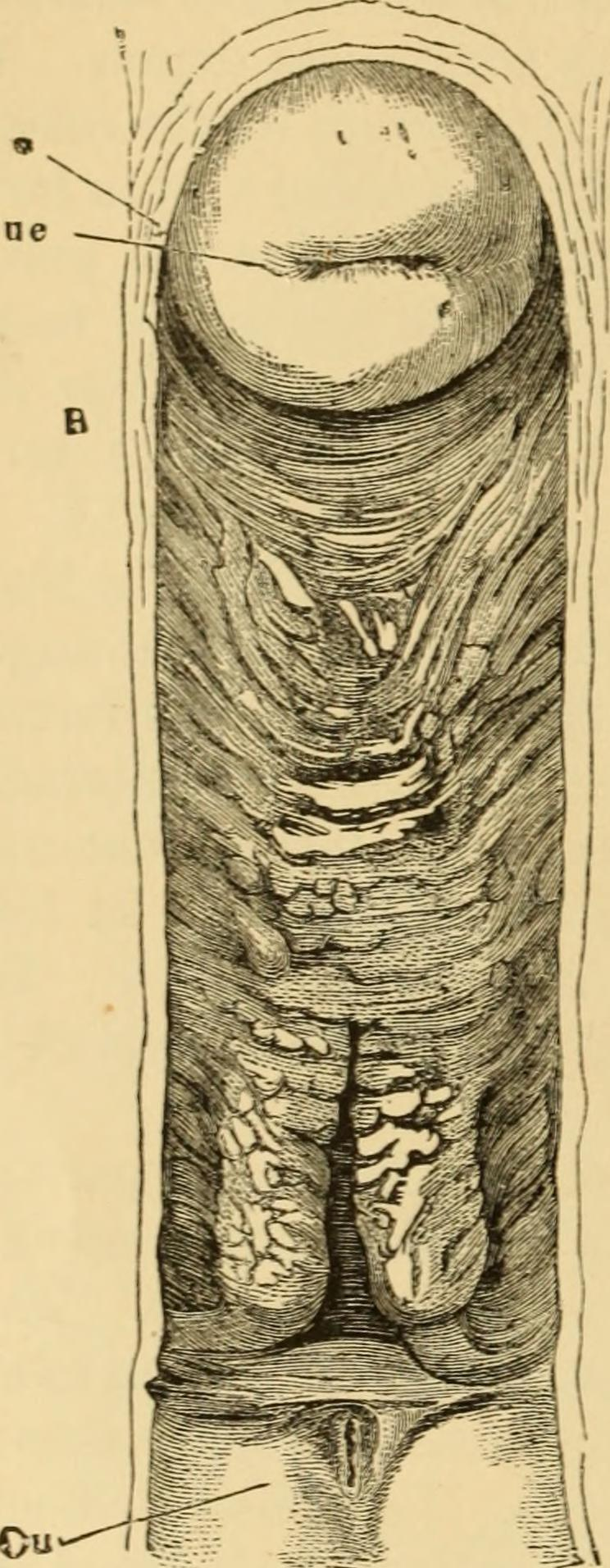
Vaginal rugae are illustrated in this 1891 medical textbook image

Vaginal rugae are structures of the vagina that are transverse ridges formed out of the supporting tissues and vaginal epithelium in females. Some conditions can cause the disappearance of vaginal rugae and are usually associated with childbirth and prolapse of pelvic structures. The rugae contribute to the resiliency and elasticity of the vagina and its ability to distend and return to its previous state. These structures not only allow expansions and an increase in surface area of the vaginal epithelium, they provide the space necessary for the vaginal microbiota. The shape and structure of the rugae are supported and maintained by the lamina propria of the vagina and the anterior and posterior rugae.

The anterior and posterior columnae rugae are transverse vaginal support structures between which the transverse rugae exist. The cross section of the vagina normally forms a shape that resembles the letter 'H' due to these structures.

Vaginal rugae disappear in older women and those with an estrogen deficiency. The rugae can disappear with anterior vaginal wall prolapse which can occur when supports to the portion located between the vagina and bladder are damaged and the bladder bulges into the vaginal lumen. Vaginal self-examination includes visualizing the presence of vaginal rugae. Anatomists identified rugae of the vagina as early as 1824.

== Development ==
The appearance and presence of vaginal rugae change over the life span of females and are associated with hormonal cycles, estrogens, childbirth, puberty and menopause. During gynecological examination of prepubescent girls, rugae can be visualized. The vaginal rugae change after menopause. In some older women the rugae are present but become flattened and difficult to see. In others, the rugae tend to disappear.

== Clinical considerations ==
Other structures can be present on the vaginal wall though most of the time these can be differentiated from rugae. Vaginal cysts can be small protrusions into the vagina that can be felt or palpated by a clinician. Vaginal inclusion cysts can appear as small bumps and can develop after childbirth. Other small structures or protrusions can be Gartner's duct cysts, patches of endometrial tissue, and benign tumors. These cystic structures can obliterate the rugae and is a clue to their presence. The absence of vaginal rugae seen in the normal vagina of a healthy woman may be an indication of a prolapsed bladder (cystocele) or rectocele. An enterocele, or bulging of the bowel into the vagina can also cause vaginal rugae to disappear. The absence of vaginal rugae may also be an indicator of pelvic organ prolapse. Vaginal rugae disappear in those with an estrogen deficiency.

== Childbirth ==
Vaginal rugae can disappear during the second stage of labor. After a vaginal birth, the rugae are not visible and the walls of the vagina are smooth. By the third week postpartum, the vagina has become much smaller and the rugae begin to reform on the vaginal walls. Six weeks after birth, the rugae have returned to approximately the same size as they were before the birth. The number of rugae after childbirth decreases. In women who have not given birth, the rugae are more prominent than in those who have given birth multiple times.
