= Vaginitis emphysematosa =

- Specialty: Gynecology

The term vaginitis emphysematosa is related to women's reproductive health and coined by Zweifel in 1877. The cases of vaginitis emphysematosa are rare. It is usually found during consults for other issues related to reproductive health. Vaginitis emphysematosa is not common and many Gynaecologists are unaware of its existence.

While the term "vaginitis" implies vaginal inflammation, it has been observed that inflammation is generally mild and absent. Vaginitis emphysematosa is characterized by gas-filled cysts in the vaginal wall and does not imply life-threatening infection. Vaginitis emphysematosa is usually a self limited cystic disorder of the vagina. It is a very rare condition and has very little specific features to arouse clinical suspicion.

== Symptoms and signs ==
The cysts are smooth, clustered, and can be as large as 2 cm. Symptoms include frothy vaginal discharge, itching, sensation of pressure, appearance of nodules, and sometimes a "popping sound".

== Risk factors ==
Vaginitis emphysematosa occurs primarily, but not exclusively in pregnant women. It is a rare, benign vaginal cyst and 173 cases have been identified in women ages 42 to 65. Risk factors may include immunosuppression, trichomonas, or Haemophilus vaginalis infection.

== Causes ==
The cause is unknown. Histological examination showed the cysts contained pink hyaline-like material, foreign body-type giant cells in the cyst's wall, with chronic inflammatory cell fluid. The gas-filled cysts are identified with CT imaging. The gas contained in the cysts has been analysed and consists of nitrogen, oxygen, argon, carbon dioxide, and sulphur dioxide.

== Treatment ==
Treatment may not be required and no complications follow the resolution of the cysts. Saline flushes may be advised to aid in treatment.

== Diagnosis ==
Vaginitis emphysematosa can be diagnosed through CT imaging and visual examination.

== See also ==
- Vaginal cysts
- Vaginal tumours
- Female reproductive system Vaginitis
- Female reproductive system § Vulva
