= Vaginal cancer =

- Specialty: Gynecologic oncology

Vaginal cancer is an extraordinarily rare form of cancer that develops in the tissue of the vagina. Primary vaginal cancer originates from the vaginal tissue – most frequently squamous cell carcinoma, but primary vaginal adenocarcinoma, sarcoma, and melanoma have also been reported – while secondary vaginal cancer involves the metastasis of a cancer that originated in a different part of the body. Secondary vaginal cancer is more common. Signs of vaginal cancer may include abnormal vaginal bleeding, dysuria, tenesmus, or pelvic pain, though as many as 20% of women diagnosed with vaginal cancer are asymptomatic at the time of diagnosis. Vaginal cancer occurs more frequently in women over age 50, and the mean age of diagnosis of vaginal cancer is 60 years. It often can be cured if found and treated in early stages. Surgery alone or surgery combined with pelvic radiation is typically used to treat vaginal cancer.

== Description ==
Carcinoma of the vagina occurs in less than 2% of women with pelvic malignant tumors. Squamous carcinoma is the most common type of vaginal cancer. The human papillomavirus (HPV) is strongly associated with vaginal cancer. Vaginal cancer occurs most often in the upper third of the vagina (51%), 30% are found in the lower third, and 19% in the middle third. Vaginal cancer can present as an elevated lesion growing out from the epithelial surface or an ulcer-like, shallow depression. Definitive diagnosis is determined by biopsy.

== Signs and symptoms ==
Most vaginal cancers do not cause signs or symptoms early on. When vaginal cancer does cause symptoms, they may include:

- Vaginal discharge or abnormal bleeding
- Unusually heavy flow of blood
- Bleeding after menopause
- Bleeding between periods; or any other
- Bleeding that is longer than normal
- Blood in the stool or urine
- Frequent or urgent need to urinate
- Feeling constipated
- Pain during sexual intercourse
- A lump or growth in the vagina that can be felt.

Enlarged pelvic lymph nodes can sometimes be palpated.

== Risk factors ==
- Prenatal exposure to diethylstilbestrol
- Infection with human papillomavirus (HPV) type 16
- Infection with human immunodeficiency virus (HIV) type 1
- Previous history of cervical cancer
- Smoking
- Chronic vulvar itching or burning

== Types ==
There are two primary types of vaginal cancer: squamous-cell carcinoma and adenocarcinoma.

- Squamous-cell carcinoma of the vagina arises from the squamous cells (epithelium) that line the vagina. This is the most common type of vaginal cancer. It is found most often in women aged 60 or older.
- Vaginal adenocarcinoma arises from the glandular (secretory) cells in the lining of the vagina. Adenocarcinoma is more likely to spread to the lungs and lymph nodes.
- Clear cell adenocarcinoma occurs in a small percentage of women (termed "DES-Daughters") born between 1938 and 1973 (later outside the United States) that were exposed to the drug diethylstilbestrol (DES) in utero. DES was prescribed to 5 to 10 million mothers period to prevent possible miscarriages and premature births. Typically, women develop DES-related adenocarcinoma before age 30, but increasing evidence suggests possible effects or cancers (including other forms of vaginal glandular tumors) at a later age. DES-exposure in women is also linked to various infertility and pregnancy complications. Daughters exposed to DES in utero may also have an increased risk of moderate/severe cervical squamous cell dysplasia and an increased risk of breast cancer. Approximately one in 1,000 (0.1%) DES daughters will be diagnosed with clear cell adenocarcinoma. The risk is virtually non-existent among premenopausal women not exposed to DES.
- Vaginal germ cell tumors (primarily teratoma and endodermal sinus tumor) are rare. They are usually found in infants and children.
- Sarcoma botryoides, a rhabdomyosarcoma, is also found most often in infants and children.
- Vaginal melanoma, a melanoma that appears in the vagina.
Stage 1 vaginal cancer

Stage 2 vaginal cancer

Stage 3 vaginal cancer

Stage 4A vaginal cancer

Stage 4B vaginal cancer

== Diagnosis and screening ==
Routine vaginal cancer screening, including routine surveillance imaging such as ultrasound or MRI, is not recommended for women who do not have symptoms. Imaging without indications is discouraged because it is unlikely to detect a recurrence or improve survival, and because it has its own costs and side effects. Several tests are used to diagnose vaginal cancer, including:

- Physical exam and history
- Pelvic exam
- Biopsy
- Colposcopy

MRI provides visualization of the extent of vaginal cancer. Other sources of cancer tissue such as the urethra or the cervix must be ruled out before a diagnosis of vaginal cancer is made. Vaginal cancer cannot be detected through cervical pap smears.

=== Classification ===
Staging: The International Federation of Gynecology and Obstetrics utilizes the Tumor, Node, Metastasis (TNM) method of staging vaginal cancer. The clinical staging of the most common form of primary vaginal cancer, squamous cell carcinoma, is outlined below.

- Stage I - Tumor confined to the vagina
- Stage II - Tumor invading tissue near the vagina, but has not spread to the pelvic wall
- Stage III- Tumor invading pelvic sidewall or interfering with renal function, obstructing the ureter to cause hydronephrosis.
- Stage IV - Tumor invading mucosa of nearby pelvic organs, including bladder or rectum, or has spread beyond the pelvis.

== Management ==
Historically, the combination of external-beam radiation therapy (EBRT) has been the most common treatment for vaginal cancer. In the early stages of vaginal cancer, surgery also has some benefit. This management and treatment is less effective for those with advanced stages of cancer, but works well in early stages with high rates of cure. Advanced vaginal cancer only has a 5-year survival rate of 52.2%, 42.5% and 20.5% for patients with stage II, III, and IVa disease. Newer treatments for advanced stages of ovarian cancer have been developed. These utilize concurrent carboplatin plus paclitaxel, EBRT and high-dose-rate interstitial brachytherapy (HDR-ISBT).

When the chance of surgical removal of all cancerous tissue is very low or when the surgery has a chance of damaging the bladder, vagina, or bowel, radiation therapy is used. When a tumor is less than 4 cm in diameter, radiation therapy provides excellent results. In these instances, the 5-year survival rate is over 80%. Treatments are individualized due to the rarity of vaginal cancer studies.

A local surgery to remove vaginal cancer

A radical hysterectomy to treat vaginal cancer without reconstruction

A radical hysterectomy for vaginal cancer with reconstruction of the vagina using other tissues

== Epidemiology ==
Cancer of the vagina is rare and is only 2% of all gynecological cancers and less than 0.5% of all cancers in women. Estimated new cases in the United States in 2017 are 4,810. Deaths from vaginal cancer during the same time were 1,240. It is more common in older women.

In the UK, 254 cases of vaginal cancer were identified in 2014. Deaths from vaginal cancer in this period were 110. Out of those with vaginal cancer, 53% are related to HPV infection.

== Research ==
=== Clinical trials ===
- Because vaginal cancer is so rare, there have been very few phase three clinical trials studying treatments specifically targeting vaginal cancer. There is an ongoing phase three trial studying the efficacy of the drug triapine to treat vaginal cancer. There are currently several phase one and two clinical trials underway to study the efficacy of new gynecological cancer treatment regimens, which include treatment for vaginal cancer.

== See also ==
- Cervical cancer
- Diethylstilbestrol
- Vaginal cysts
- Vaginal tumors
- Vulvar cancer
