= Cider (disambiguation) =

Cider is an alcoholic beverage made from the fermented juice of apples.

Cider may also refer to:

- Apple cider, or simply cider, a non-alcoholic beverage made from apples
- Cider, a technology by TransGaming Technologies for Windows games to run on Mac OS X
- Cider, a mixed-level electronics extension integrated into the circuit simulator ngspice
- Columbia Cider, a technology to allow iOS apps to run on Android
- (in Japan and South Korea) a lemon-lime drink (see List of lemon-lime drink brands)

== See also ==
- CIDR (disambiguation)
