= Estrous cycle =

Ovulation cycle occurring in most female mammalian therians

The estrous cycle (US-EN; /ˈɛstrəs/) or oestrous cycle (UK-EN; /ˈiːstrəs/) (from Latin oestrus 'frenzy', originally from Ancient Greek οἶστρος (oîstros) 'gadfly') is a set of recurring physiological changes induced by reproductive hormones in females of mammalian subclass Theria. Estrous cycles start after sexual maturity in females and are interrupted by anestrous phases, otherwise known as "rest" phases, or by pregnancies. Typically, estrous cycles repeat until death. These cycles are widely variable in duration and frequency depending on the species. Some animals may display bloody vaginal discharge, often mistaken for menstruation.

Many mammals used in commercial agriculture, such as cattle and sheep, may have their estrous cycles artificially controlled with hormonal medications for optimum productivity. The male equivalent, seen primarily in ruminants, is called rut. Humans and some other species exhibit hidden estrus (concealed ovulation).

== Etymology and nomenclature ==
In British English, the spelling is oestrous cycle and oestrus, or (rarely) œstrus. In all English spellings, the noun ends in -us and the adjective in -ous. Thus in Modern International English, a mammal may be described as "in [o]estrus" when it is in that particular part of the [o]estrous-cycle.

Estrus is derived via Latin oestrus ('frenzy', 'gadfly'), from Greek οἶστρος oîstros (literally 'gadfly', more figuratively 'frenzy', 'madness', among other meanings like 'breeze'). Specifically, this refers to the gadfly in Ancient Greek mythology that Hera sent to torment Io, who had been won in her heifer form by Zeus. Euripides used oestrus to indicate 'frenzy', and to describe madness. Homer used the word to describe panic.

Plato also used it to refer to an irrational drive and to describe the soul "driven and drawn by the gadfly of desire". Somewhat more closely aligned to current meaning and usage of estrus, Herodotus (Histories, ch. 93.1) uses oîstros to describe the desire of fish to spawn.

The earliest use in English was with a meaning of 'frenzied passion'. In 1900, it was first used to describe 'rut in animals; heat'.

== Differences from the menstrual cycle ==
Mammals share the same reproductive system, including the regulatory hypothalamic system that produces gonadotropin-releasing hormone in pulses, the pituitary gland that secretes follicle-stimulating hormone and luteinizing hormone, and the ovary itself that releases sex hormones, including estrogens and progesterone.

However, animals that have estrous cycles resorb the endometrium if conception does not occur during that cycle. Mammals that have menstrual cycles shed the endometrium through menstruation instead.

Humans, elephant shrews, and a few other species have menstrual cycles rather than estrous cycles. Humans, unlike most other species, have concealed ovulation, a lack of obvious external signs to signal estral receptivity at ovulation (i.e., the ability to become pregnant). Some species of animals with estrous cycles have unmistakable outward displays of receptivity, ranging from engorged and colorful genitals to behavioral changes like mating calls.

== Four phases ==
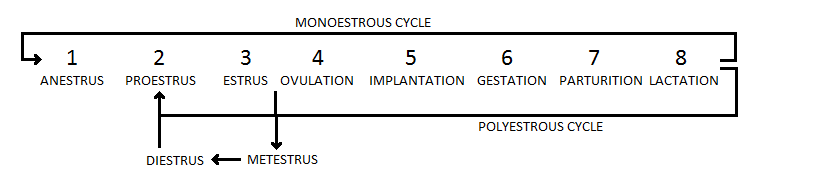

A four-phase terminology is used in reference to animals with estrous cycles.

=== Proestrus ===
One or several follicles of the ovary start to grow. Their number is species-specific. Typically, this phase can last as little as one day or as long as three weeks, depending on the species. Under the influence of estrogen, the lining of the uterus (endometrium) starts to develop. Some animals may experience vaginal secretions that could be bloody. The female is not yet sexually receptive; the old corpus luteum degenerates; the uterus and the vagina distend and fill with fluid, become contractile and secrete a sanguinous fluid; the vaginal epithelium proliferates and the vaginal cytology shows a large number of non-cornified nucleated epithelial cells. Variant terms for proestrus include pro-oestrus, proestrum, and pro-oestrum.

=== Estrus ===
Estrus (US-EN) or oestrus (UK-EN) refers to the phase when the female is sexually receptive ("in heat" in American English, or "on heat" in British English). Under regulation by gonadotropic hormones, ovarian follicles mature and estrogen secretions exert their biggest influence. The female then exhibits sexually receptive behavior, a situation that may be signaled by visible physiologic changes. Estrus is commonly seen in the mammalian species, including some primates.

In some species, the vulva becomes swollen and reddened. Ovulation may occur spontaneously in others. Especially among quadrupeds, a signal trait of estrus is the lordosis reflex, in which the animal spontaneously elevates her hindquarters.

Controlled internal drug release devices are used in livestock for the synchronization of estrus.

=== Metestrus or diestrus ===
This phase is characterized by the activity of the corpus luteum, which produces progesterone. The signs of estrogen stimulation subside and the corpus luteum starts to form. The uterine lining begins to appear. In the absence of pregnancy, the diestrus phase (also termed pseudopregnancy) terminates with the regression of the corpus luteum. The lining in the uterus is not shed, but is reorganized for the next cycle. Other spellings include metoestrus, metestrum, metoestrum, dioestrus, diestrum, and dioestrum.

=== Anestrus ===
Anestrus refers to the phase when the sexual cycle rests. This is typically a seasonal event and controlled by light exposure through the pineal gland that releases melatonin. Melatonin may repress stimulation of reproduction in long-day breeders and stimulate reproduction in short-day breeders. Melatonin is thought to act by regulating the hypothalamic pulse activity of the gonadotropin-releasing hormone. Anestrus is induced by time of year, pregnancy, lactation, significant illness, chronic energy deficit, and possibly age. Chronic exposure to anabolic steroids may also induce a persistent anestrus due to negative feedback on the hypothalamus/pituitary/gonadal axis. Other spellings include anoestrus, anestrum, and anoestrum.

After completion (or abortion) of a pregnancy, some species have postpartum estrus, which is ovulation and corpus luteum production that occurs immediately following the birth of the young. For example, the mouse has a fertile postpartum estrus that occurs 14 to 24 hours following parturition.

== Cycle-variability ==
Estrous cycle variability differs among species, but cycles are typically more frequent in smaller animals. Even within species significant variability can be observed, thus cats may undergo an estrous cycle of 3 to 7 weeks. Domestication can affect estrous cycles due to changes in the environment. For most species, vaginal smear cytology may be used in order to identify estrous cycle phases and durations.

== Frequency ==
Some species, such as cats, cows and domestic pigs, are polyestrous, meaning that they can go into heat several times per year. Seasonally polyestrous animals or seasonal breeders have more than one estrous cycle during a specific time of the year and can be divided into short-day and long-day breeders:

- Short-day breeders, such as sheep, goats, deer and elk are sexually active in fall or winter.
- Long-day breeders, such as horses, hamsters and ferrets are sexually active in spring and summer.

Species that go into heat twice per year are diestrous. Canines are diestrous.

Monestrous species, such as canids and bears, have only one breeding season per year, typically in spring to allow growth of the offspring during the warm season to aid survival during the next winter.

A few mammalian species, such as rabbits, do not have an estrous cycle, instead being induced to ovulate by the act of mating and are able to conceive at almost any arbitrary moment.

Generally speaking, the timing of estrus is coordinated with seasonal availability of food and other circumstances such as migration, predation etc., the goal being to maximize the offspring's chances of survival. Some species are able to modify their estral timing in response to external conditions.

== Specific species ==
=== Cats ===
The female cat in heat has an estrus of 14 to 21 days and is generally characterized as an induced ovulator, since coitus induces ovulation. However, various incidents of spontaneous ovulation have been documented in the domestic cat and various non-domestic species. Without ovulation, she may enter interestrus, which is the combined stages of diestrus and anestrus, before reentering estrus. With the induction of ovulation, the female becomes pregnant or undergoes a non-pregnant luteal phase, also known as pseudopregnancy. Cats are polyestrous but experience a seasonal anestrus in autumn and late winter.

=== Dogs ===
A female dog is usually diestrous (goes into heat typically twice per year), although some breeds typically have one or three cycles per year. The proestrus is relatively long at 5 to 9 days, while the estrus may last 4 to 13 days, with a diestrus of 60 days followed by about 90 to 150 days of anestrus. Female dogs bleed during estrus, which usually lasts from 7–13 days, depending on the size and maturity of the dog. Ovulation occurs 24–48 hours after the luteinizing hormone peak, which occurs around the fourth day of estrus; therefore, this is the best time to begin breeding. Proestrus bleeding in dogs is common and is believed to be caused by diapedesis of red blood cells from the blood vessels due to the increase of the estradiol-17β hormone.

=== Horses ===
A mare may be in heat for 4 to 10 days, followed by approximately 14 days in diestrus. Thus, a cycle may be short, totaling approximately 3 weeks. Horses mate in spring and summer; autumn is a transition time, and anestrus occurs during winter.

A feature of the fertility cycle of horses and other large herd animals is that it is usually affected by the seasons. The number of hours daily that light enters the eye of the animal affects the brain, which governs the release of certain precursors and hormones. When daylight hours are few, these animals "shut down", become anestrous, and do not become fertile. As the days grow longer, the longer periods of daylight cause the hormones that activate the breeding cycle to be released. As it happens, this benefits these animals in that, given a gestation period of about eleven months, it prevents them from having young when the cold of winter would make their survival risky.

=== Rats ===
Rats are polyestrous animals that typically have rapid cycle lengths of 4 to 5 days. Although they ovulate spontaneously, they do not develop a fully functioning corpus luteum unless they receive coital stimulation. Fertile mating leads to pregnancy in this way, but infertile mating leads to a state of pseudopregnancy lasting about 10 days. Mice and hamsters have similar behavior. The events of the cycle are strongly influenced by lighting periodicity.

A set of follicles starts to develop near the end of proestrus and grows at a nearly constant rate until the beginning of the subsequent estrus when the growth rates accelerate eightfold. Ovulation occurs about 109 hours after the start of follicle growth.

Estrogen peaks at about 11 am on the day of proestrus. Between then and midnight there is a surge in progesterone, luteinizing hormone and follicle-stimulating hormone, and ovulation occurs at about 4 am on the next estrus day. The following day, metestrus, is called early diestrus or diestrus I. During this day, the corpora lutea grow to a maximal volume, achieved within 24 hours of ovulation. They remain at that size for three days, halve in size before the metestrus of the next cycle and then shrink abruptly before estrus of the cycle after that. Thus the ovaries of cycling rats contain three different sets of corpora lutea at different phases of development.

=== Bison ===
Buffalo have an estrous cycle of about 22 to 24 days. Buffalo are known for difficult estrus detection. This is one major reason for being less productive than cattle. During four phases of its estrous cycle, mean weight of corpus luteum has been found to be 1.23±0.22g (metestrus), 3.15±0.10g (early diestrus), 2.25±0.32g (late diestrus), and 1.89±0.31g (proestrus/estrus), respectively. The plasma progesterone concentration was 1.68±0.37, 4.29±0.22, 3.89±0.33, and 0.34±0.14 ng/ml while mean vascular density (mean number of vessels/10 microscopic fields at 400x) in corpus luteum was 6.33±0.99, 18.00±0.86, 11.50±0.76, and 2.83±0.60 during the metestrus, early diestrus, late diestrus and proestrus/estrus, respectively.

=== Cattle ===
Female cattle, also referred to as "heifers" in agriculture, will gradually enter standing estrus, or "standing heat," starting at puberty between 9 and 15 months of age. The cow estrous cycle typically lasts 21 days. Standing estrus is a visual cue which signifies sexual receptivity for mounting by male cattle. This behavior lasts anywhere between 8 and 30 hours at a time. Other behaviors of the female during standing estrus may change, including, but not limited to: nervousness, swollen vulva, or attempting to mount other animals. While visual and behavioral cues are helpful to the male cattle, estrous stages cannot be determined by the human eye. Rather, the stage can be estimated from the appearance of the corpora lutea or follicle composition.

==== Estrous control ====
Due to the widespread use of bovine animals in agriculture, cattle estrous cycles have been widely studied, and manipulated, in an effort to maximize profitability through reproductive management. Much estrous control in cattle is for the purpose of synchronization, a practice or set of practices most often used by cattle farmers to control the timing and duration of estrus in large herds.

There is variation between the available methods of cattle estrous synchronization. Treatment depends on herd size, specific goals for control, and budget. Some of the FDA-approved drugs and devices used to mimic natural hormones of the estrous cycle include, but are not limited to, the following classes:

- Gonadorelin: There are currently five available gonadorelin products that are FDA-Approved. Usually, gonadorelin is used in conjunction with another estrous control drug (typically, prostaglandin). This drug is used to mimic gonadotropin releasing hormone (GnRH) and may also be used to treat ovarian cysts.
- Prostaglandin: Mimics the prostaglandin F2-alpha hormone released when no pregnancy has occurred and regresses the corpus luteum. This drug is used to achieve more consistent results in artificial insemination.
- Progestin: Used to suppress estrus and/or block ovulation. Most commonly, it is administered via an intravaginal insert comparable to an IUD, which used in controlling menstrual periods. It is also available as a medicated feed, but this method is not yet approved for cattle crop synchronization.

There is variation between the available methods of cattle estrous synchronization. Treatment depends on herd size, specific goals for control, and budget.

Bovine estrous cycles may also be impacted by other bodily functions such as oxytocin levels. Additionally, heat stress has been linked to impairment of follicular development, especially impactful to the first-wave dominant follicle. Future synchronization programs are planning to focus on the impact of heat stress on fertilization and embryonic death rates after artificial insemination.

Additionally, work has been done regarding other mammalian females, such as in dogs, for estrous control; However, there are yet to be any approved medications outside of those commercially available.

=== Others ===
Estrus frequencies of some other notable mammals:

- Sheep: 18 days
- Pig: 21 days
- Goat: 21 days
- Donkey: 13 to 31 days (average 23)
- Elephant: 16 weeks
- Wolf: 9 days

== See also ==
- Mating system
- Musth
- Neutering
- Progesterone-releasing intravaginal device
- Reproductive cycle
- Rut (mammalian reproduction)
- Sexual swelling
