= CIDR (disambiguation) =

CIDR stands for Classless Inter-Domain Routing, a method for allocating IP addresses and routing Internet Protocol packets.

CIDR may also refer to:

== Biology and medicine ==
- Controlled internal drug release, devices used in livestock for the synchronization of estrus
- Center for Infectious Disease Research at the University of Wisconsin
- Center for Global Infectious Disease Research, now a part of the Seattle Children's Research Institute
- Not to be confused with the Center for Infectious Disease Research and Policy at UMinn

== Miscellaneous other uses ==
- CIDR-FM, an FM radio station in Windsor, Ontario, Canada
