= Vaginal melanoma =

- Specialty: Oncology/gynecology

Vaginal melanoma is a rare malignancy that originates from melanocytes in the vaginal epithelium. It is also known as a melanocytic tumor or as a melanoma. It is aggressive and infrequently cured. The median overall survival is 16 months. Vaginal melanoma accounts 5.5% of all vaginal cancers and only 1% of all melanomas diagnosed in women. Vaginal melanomas are frequently diagnosed in advanced stages of the disease. The prognosis is poor and the most important risk factor is the presence of lymph node metastases.

== Presentation ==
This cancer most often develops on the lowest third of the vagina. It is darkly pigmented and of an irregular T-shape, but amelanotic melanomas have been described in 7% of cases. Melanoma of the vagina can be several centimeters in size.

== Histology ==
When the tissue is assessed, the histological characteristics include:

- the shape of the cells appear similar to epithelial and spindle-shaped
- the growth occurs in the shapes of sheets and nests
- the presence of melanin in the cells
- the nucleus of the cells is large and abnormal

=== Other cancers ===
Other cancerous conditions arise from vaginal epithelium:

- Vaginal squamous-cell carcinoma arises from the squamous cells of the vaginal epithelium
- Vaginal adenocarcinoma arises from secretory cells in the vaginal epithelium
- Clear cell adenocarcinoma of the vagina this malignancy arises in some women prenatally exposed to diethylstilbestrol

== Diagnosis ==
A biopsy should be obtained from all suspicious lesions and Immunocytochemistry can reveal positive results for S-110 protein, HMB 45 and melan A. Once the diagnosis of vaginal melanoma is established, additional examinations should be performed to exclude the spread to regional lymph nodes or distant organs, as the diagnosis of vaginal melanoma is often delayed. Lymph-node involvement is the most important prognostic factor.

== Treatment ==
Surgery represents the primary treatment modality. Chemotherapy may be ineffective, but checkpoint inhibitors and BRAF and MEK inhibitors have been recently tested in vaginal melanomas. Less than 10% of vaginal melanomas have BRAF-mutations. Therefore BRAF-inhibitors play only a minor role in vaginal melanomas (unlike in skin melanomas). However, a recent study has shown that checkpoint inhibitors (inkluding CTLA-4 inhibitors and PD-1 inhibitors) are effective in the treatment of advanced vulvovaginal melanomas.
