= Controlled internal drug release =

Controlled internal drug release (CIDR) devices are used in livestock for the synchronization of estrus. They are T-shaped devices with a silicone-coated nylon core. The silicone coating is impregnated with progesterone. CIDRs are inserted intra-vaginally using a specialized applicator. The flexible wings collapse for facilitated insertion and expand once placed appropriately within the vagina. The expansion of the wings retains its position; CIDRs have very high retention rates that may exceed 97%. A thin nylon tail remains exteriorized and is used for removal.

Once inserted, CIDRs provide slow-release administration of progesterone, which artificially extends the luteal phase. Plasma progesterone levels rapidly increase upon insertion, and remain relatively consistent while in place. Following CIDR removal, progesterone levels decrease rapidly. Occasionally, vaginal irritation may occur. This is normal and does not impact the effectiveness of the device or the animal’s performance.

There are several types of CIDRs available, including CIDR-B for cattle, CIDR-S for sheep and CIDR-G for goats. CIDRs are similar to the progesterone-releasing intravaginal device (PRID), also used for synchronization of estrous cycles in livestock.

== Uses ==
CIDRs are approved for use in both beef cattle and dairy heifers in Canada and the United States. CIDRs contain 1.9g of progesterone in Canada and 1.38g in the United States. The CIDR-S is licensed for use in sheep and goats in New Zealand and Australia. The CIDR-G is also suitable for use in ewes, lambs and goats.

=== Oestrus synchronization ===
==== Cattle ====
In cattle, CIDR-Bs are often used with synchronization protocols. The product label typically indicates that, in conjunction with an appropriate synchronization protocol, CIDRs should be left in for 7 days. Ovsynch is a particular protocol that is often followed. These estrus synchronization protocols allow Fixed Time Artificial Insemination to be used, giving herd managers more accurate control. The use of CIDRs with synchronization protocols helps improve reproductive performance by reducing the inefficiency associated with estrus detection.

Although there is variability in the response to estrus synchronization, studies show consistently high pregnancy rates following Fixed Time Artificial Insemination with CIDR synchronization of ovarian follicle development.

==== Sheep and goats ====
Previously, intravaginal progestogen sponges were a common method of estrus manipulation in ewes. The development and success of CIDRs has increased their use in sheep and goats. Unlike intravaginal progestogen sponges, CIDRs do not absorb or impede drainage of natural vaginal secretions, offering a cleaner method of delivery. They also allow administration of a natural form of hormone, as opposed to the potent analogues used in sponges. A dose of 550 mg of progesterone has been found to be effective in controlling estrus and ovulation in sheep.

=== Treatment of follicular cysts ===
CIDRs may be used as a treatment in cows with follicular cysts. Follicular cysts in cattle affect a significant proportion of dairy cows in several countries, and hinder the dairy industry by extending the period from calving to conception. CIDRs help by reducing the Luteinizing Hormone pulse frequency and inducing atresia of cystic follicles. This may also allow affected cows to be re-used in breeding or embryo transfer programs.

== History ==
CIDRs were developed by AHI Plastic Moulding Company in Hamilton, New Zealand, in conjunction with the Ministry of Agriculture and Forestry (New Zealand). Developmental trials began in 1981. The CIDR-S was licensed in 1986 and the CIDR-G in 1988.
