= List of vaginal tumors =

Vaginal tumors are neoplasms (tumors) found in the vagina. They can be benign or malignant. (Note: There are four main groups of vaginal neoplasms: benign neoplasms, in situ neoplasms, malignant neoplasms, and neoplasms of uncertain or unknown behavior. Malignant neoplasms are also simply known as cancers. Tumor (American English) or tumour (British English), Latin for swelling, one of the cardinal signs of inflammation, originally meant any form of swelling, neoplastic or not. Current English, however, both medical and non-medical, uses tumor as a synonym for a neoplasm (a solid or fluid-filled cystic lesion that may or may not be formed by an abnormal growth of neoplastic cells) that appears enlarged in size.Some neoplasms do not form a tumor; these include leukemia and most forms of carcinoma in situ. Tumor is also not synonymous with cancer. While cancer is by definition malignant, a tumor can be benign, precancerous, or malignant) A neoplasm is an abnormal growth of tissue that usually forms a tissue mass. Vaginal neoplasms may be solid, cystic or of mixed type.

Vaginal cancers arise from vaginal tissue, with vaginal sarcomas develop from bone, cartilage, fat, muscle, blood vessels or other connective or supportive tissue. Tumors in the vagina may also be metastases (malignant tissue that has spread to the vagina from other parts of the body). Cancer that has spread from the colon, bladder, and stomach is far more common than cancer that originates in the vagina itself. Some benign tumors may later progress to become malignant tumors, such as vaginal cancers. Some neoplastic growths of the vagina are sufficiently rare as to be only described in case studies.

Signs and symptoms may include a feeling of pressure, painful intercourse or bleeding. Most vaginal tumors are located during a pelvic exam. Ultrasonography, CT and MRI imaging is used to establish the location and presence or absence of fluid in a tumor. Biopsy provides a more definitive diagnosis.

== Vaginal tumors ==
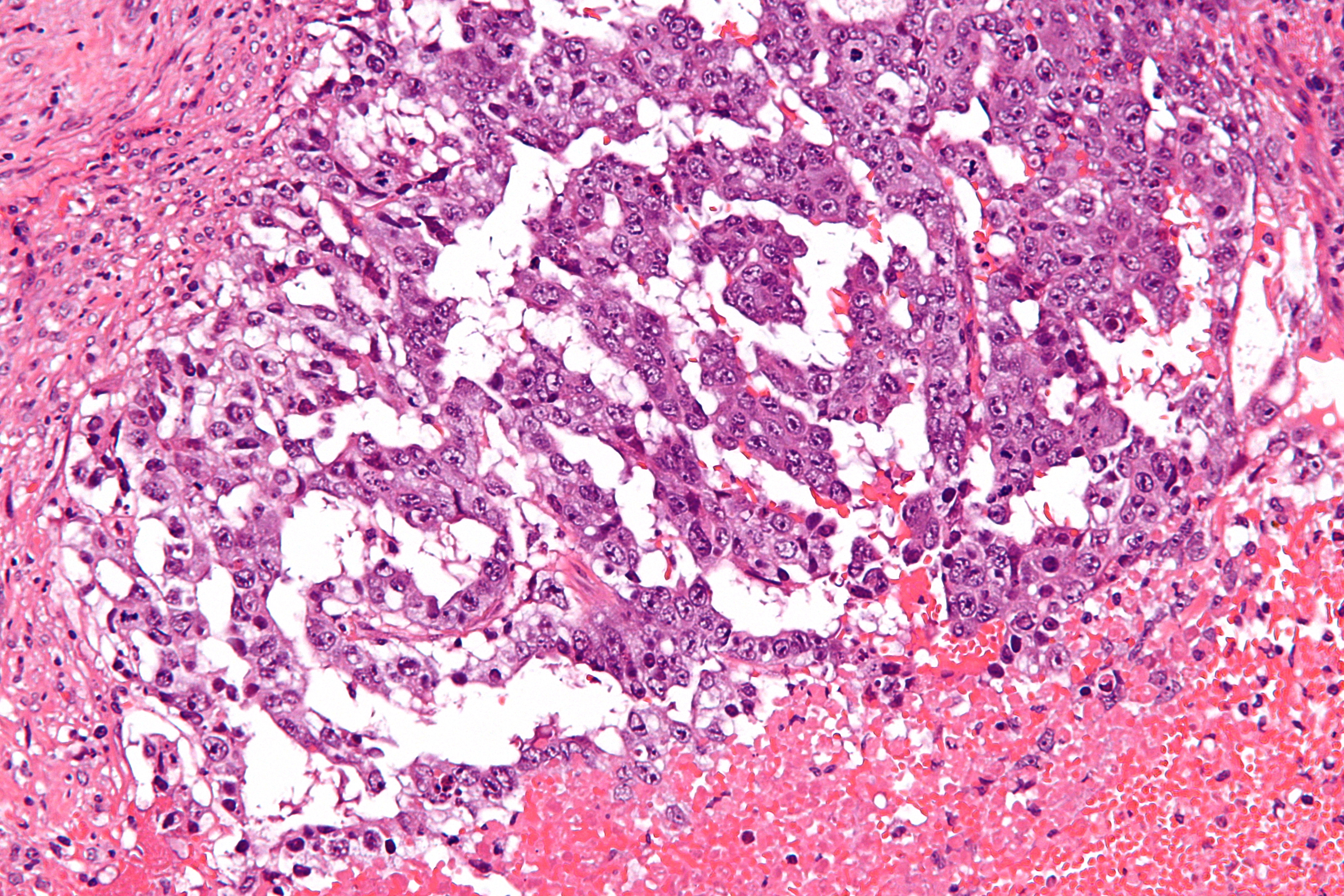
Micrograph showing the yolk sac component of a mixed germ cell tumour. H&E stain.

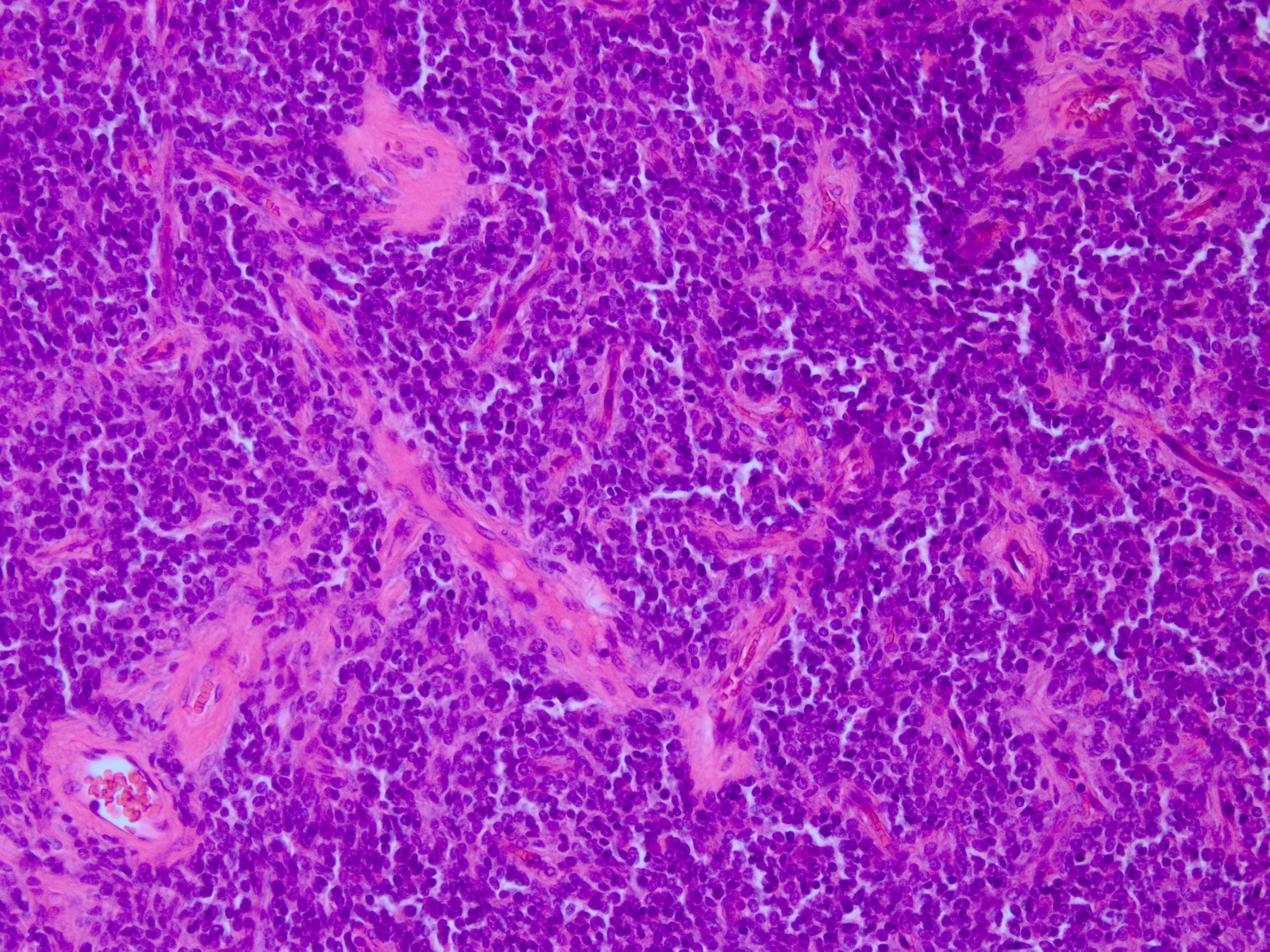
Micrograph of an H&E stained section of a peripheral PNET

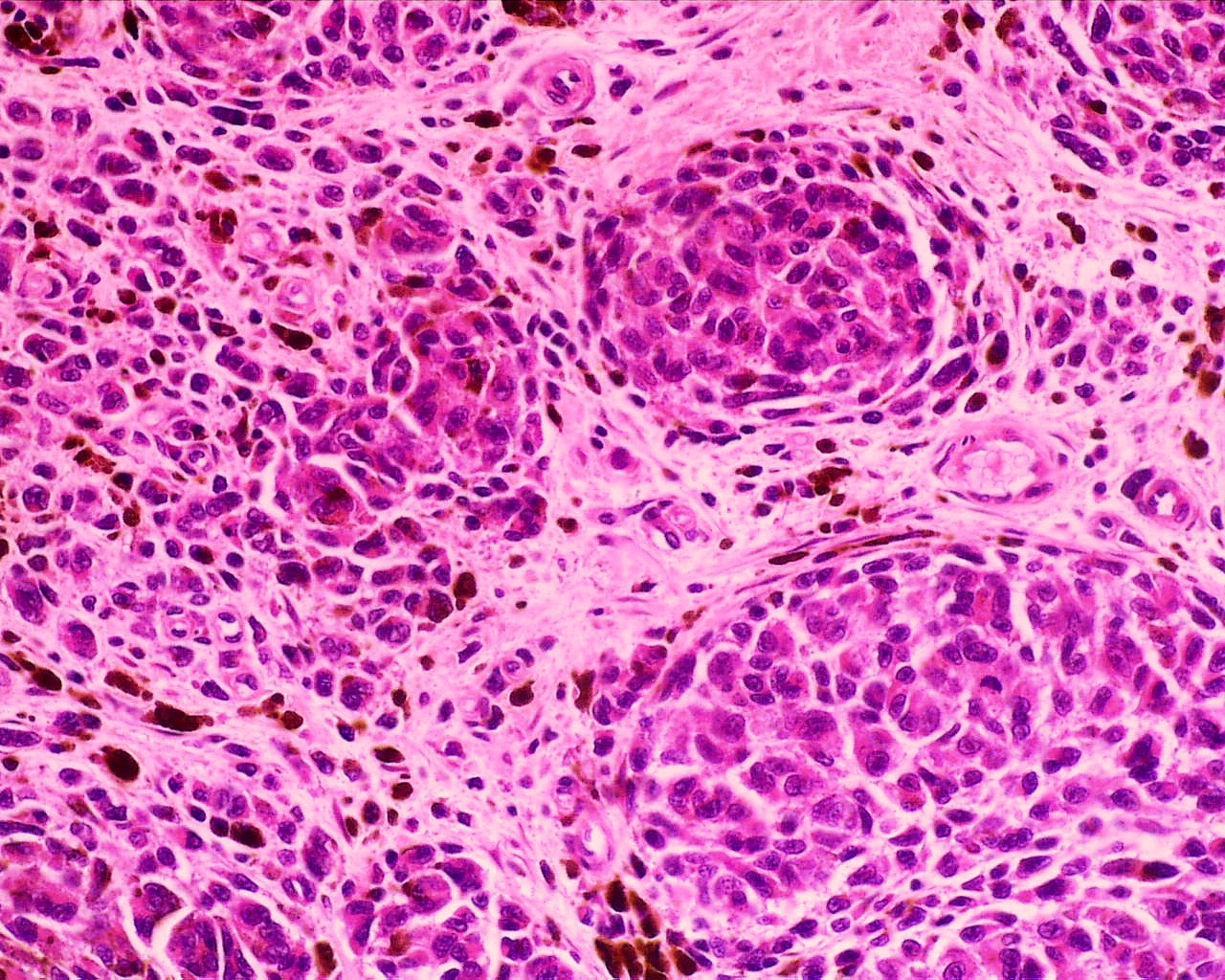
Blue nevus

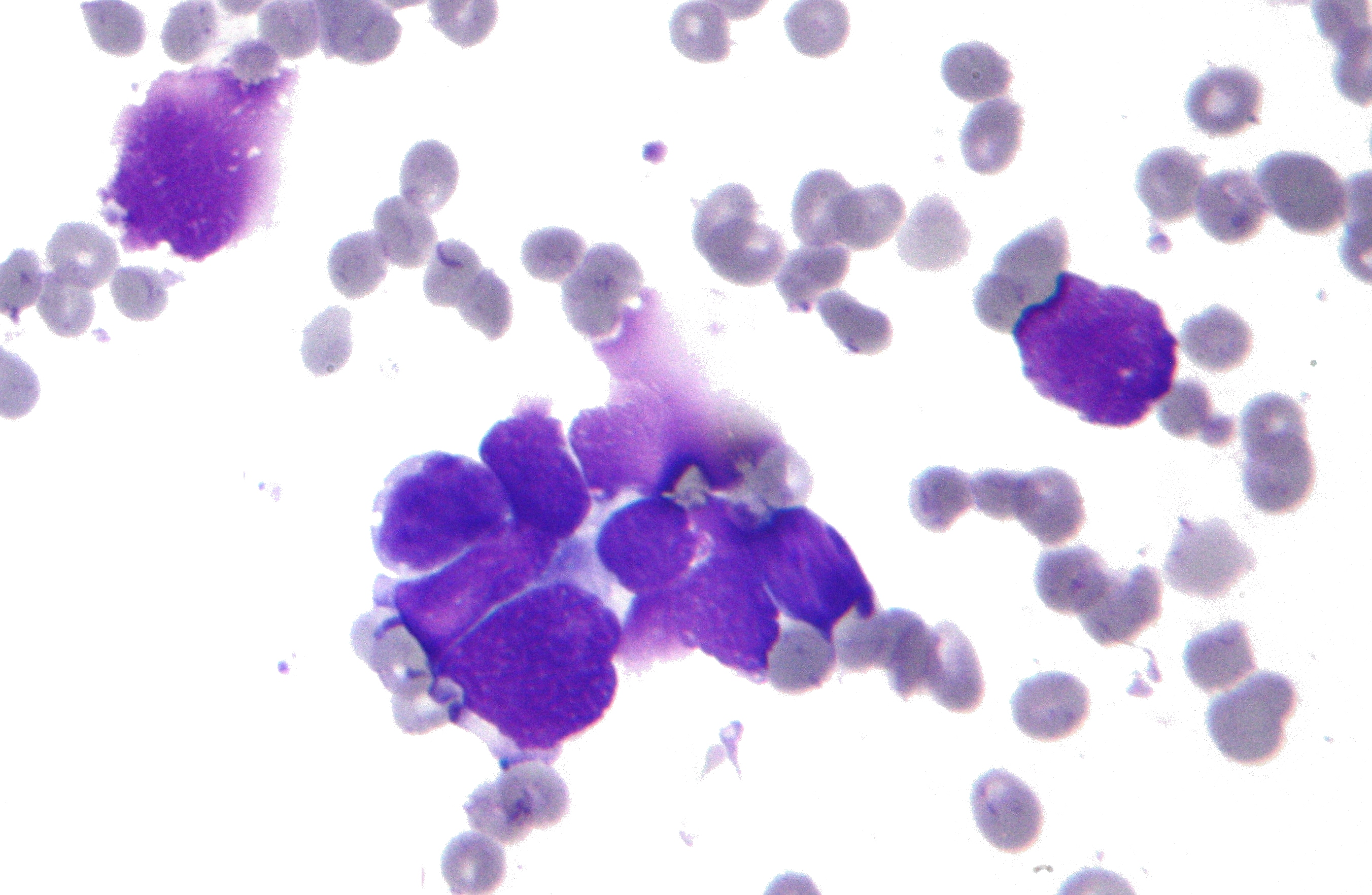
Micrograph of a small-cell carcinoma showing cells with nuclear moulding, minimal amount of cytoplasm and stippled chromatin

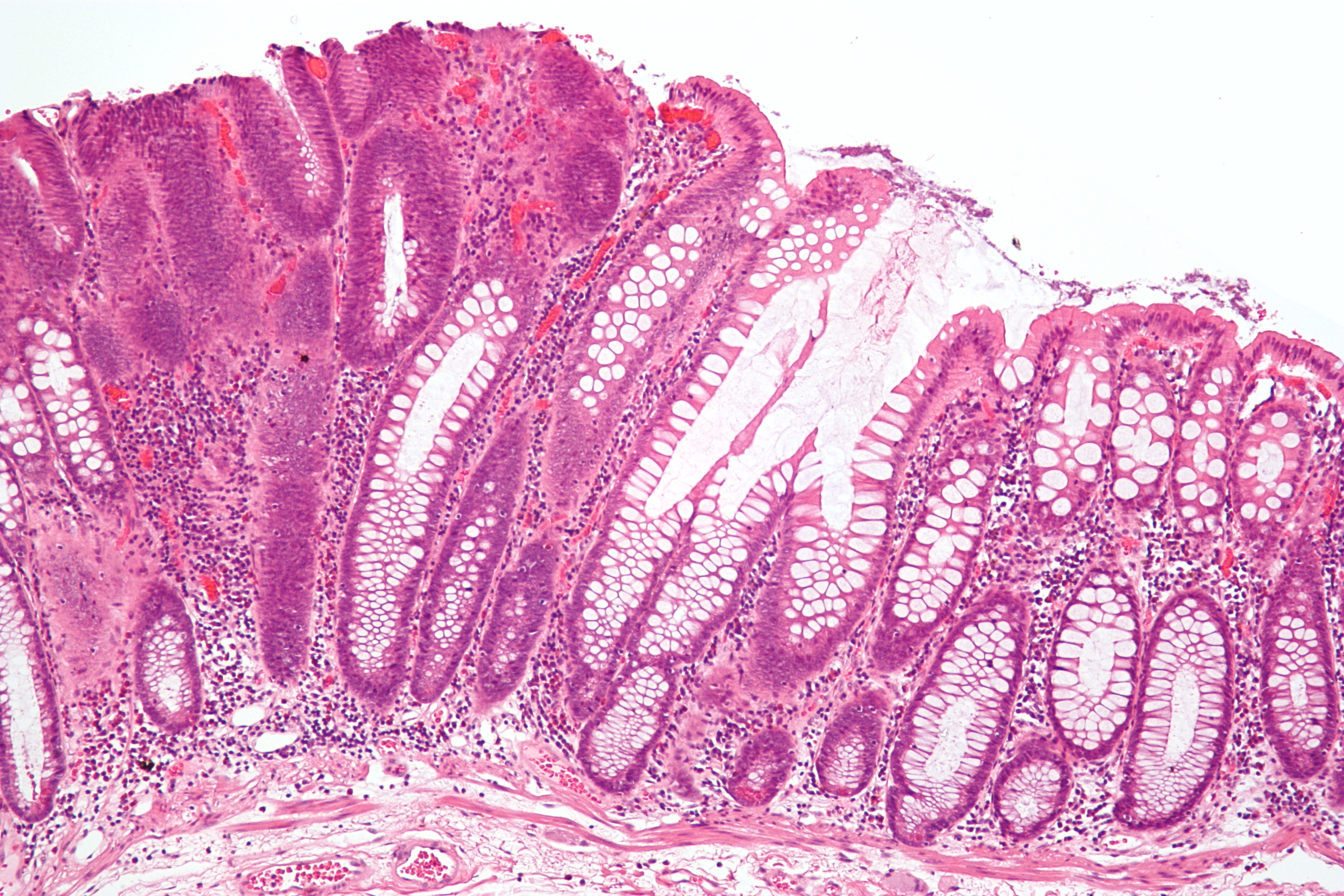
Micrograph of a mucinous adenocarcinoma

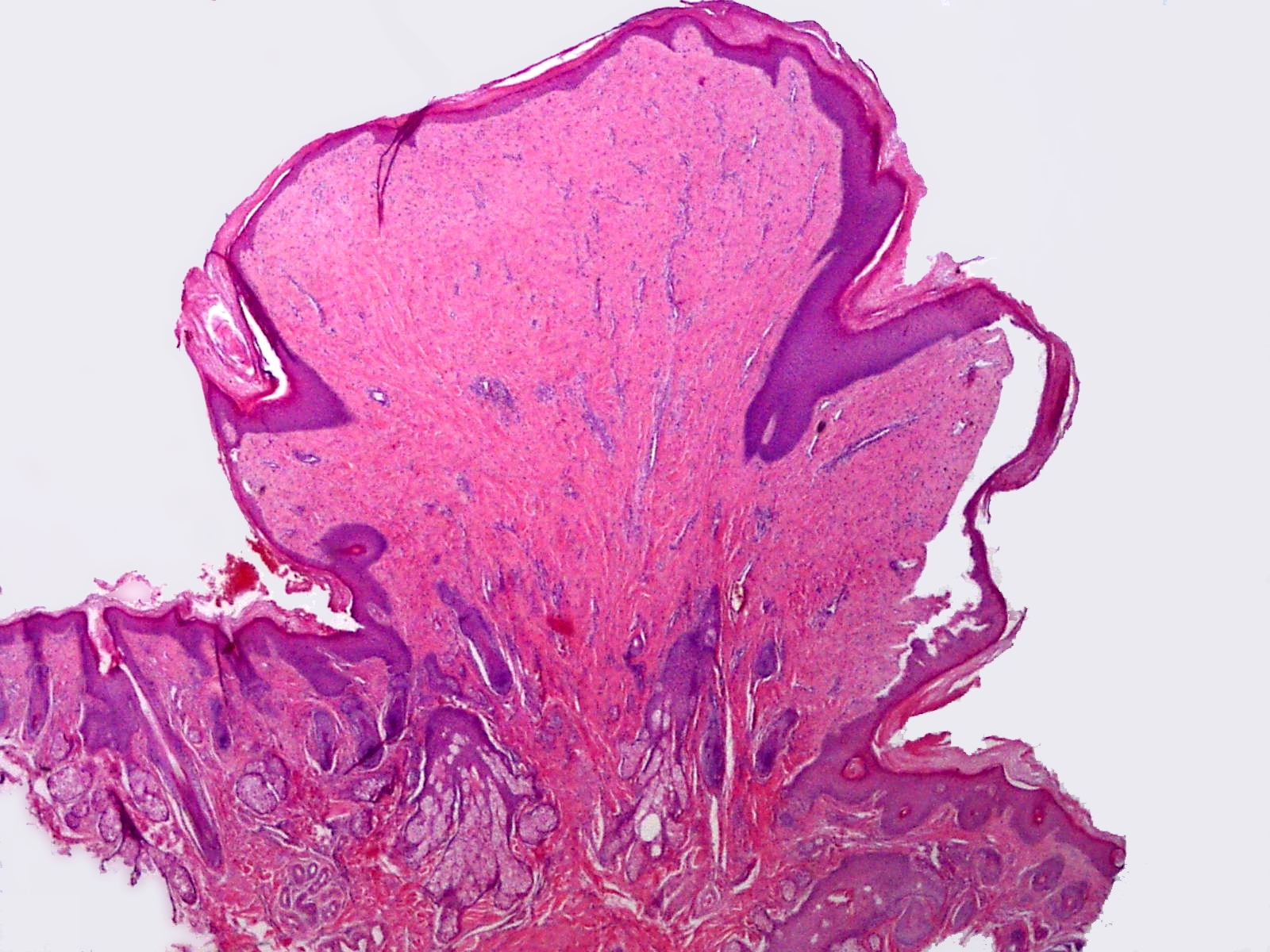
Micrograph of fibroepithelial polyp

| Vaginal tumors | Benign | Synonyms and notes | Ref. |
|---|---|---|---|
| Yolk sac tumor | no | Endodermal sinus tumor | |
| Peripheral primitive neuroectodermal tumor | no | Ewing's sarcoma | |
| Vaginal melanoma | no | Melanocytic tumor | |
| Blue nevus | yes | Melanocytic tumor, blue mole, nevus bleu, melanocytic nevus | |
| Carcinosarcoma | no | Malignant Mullerian Mixed tumors; metaplastic carcinoma | |
| Sarcoma botryoides | no | botryoid sarcoma, botryoid rhabdomyosarcoma; subtype of embryonal rhabdomyosarcoma | |
| Leimyosarcoma | no | localized tumor of leukemic cells | |
| Endometrioid stromal sarcoma | no | endometrial stromal sarcoma | |
| Undifferentiated vaginal sarcoma | | | |
| Leiomyoma | yes | fibromyoma | |
| Genital rhabdomyoma | | | |
| Deep angiomyoxoma | | | |
| Spindle cell nodule | | Vaginal Solitary Fibrous Tumor | |
| Undifferentiated carcinoma | | | |
| Small cell carcinoma | no | | |
| Carcinoid | no | | |
| Adenoid basal carcinoma | | | |
| Adenosquamous carcinoma | no | | |
| Adenoma | yes | | |
| Mucinous adenocarcinoma | | | |
| Squamous papilloma | yes | vaginal micropapillomatosis | |
| Endometrioid adenocarcinoma | no | | |
| Mesonephric adenocarcinoma | | | |
| Clear cell adenocarcinoma | no | | |
| Fibroepithelial polyp | yes | | |
| Squamous intraepithelial neoplasia | | | |
| Genital wart | yes | Condylomata acuminata | |
| Squamous cell carcinoma | no | Keratinizing, Nonkeratininzing, Basalaoid, Verrucous, Warty | |
| Mesenchymal tumors | | | |
| Alveolar soft part sarcoma | | | |
| Mixed epithelial and mesenchymal Tumors | | | |
| Malignant mixed tumors resembling synovial sarcoma | | | |
| Benign mixed tumors | | | |
| Adenomatoid Tumor | yes | | |
| Malignant lymphoma | no | | |
| Granulocytic sarcoma | | | |
| Fibroepithelial polyp | yes | | |
| Verrucous carcinoma | no | | |
| Squamotransitional cell carcinoma | | | |

== Other animals ==
Vaginal tumors also can be found in domesticated animals:

- Sarcoma botryoides
- Squamous cell carcinoma
- Condyloma acuminatum
- Squamous intraepithelial neoplasia
- Fibroepithelial polyp
- Clear-cell adenocarcinoma
- Squamous papilloma
- Leiomyoma
- Blue nevus
- Melanoma
- Primitive neuroectodermal tumor
- Yolk sac tumor

== See also ==
- Urethral caruncle
- Vaginal cysts
- Vaginal intraepithelial neoplasia
