= Amplitude death =

Complete cessation of oscillations in the theory of dynamical systems

In the theory of dynamical systems, amplitude death refers to a complete stop of oscillations as a result of coupling interactions. The phenomenon can arise from systems either in periodic motion or chaotic motion before it goes to amplitude death. Understanding the complex behavior of oscillators is important for applications in pendulums, fluid, ecological, and population dynamics.

A dynamical system can go to amplitude death because of change in intrinsic parameters of the system or its interaction with other systems or its environment. Amplitude death can appear also because of the delay in the coupling between the systems

== See also ==
- Indeterminism
- Nonlinear system
- Chaos (disambiguation)
