= Clear-cell adenocarcinoma of the vagina =

Clear-cell adenocarcinoma of the vagina (and/or cervix)
- Specialty: Oncology/gynecology

Clear-cell adenocarcinoma of the vagina (and/or cervix) is a rare adenocarcinoma often linked to prenatal exposure to diethylstilbestrol (DES), a drug which was prescribed in high-risk pregnancy.

== Presentation ==
After age 30 it was thought that women exposed prenatally, "DES daughters", were no longer at risk for the disease, but as they age into their 40s and 50, cases continue to be reported.

According to the Centers for Disease Control and Prevention (CDC), DES daughters should have a pap/pelvic exam every year because of their lifelong risk for clear-cell adenocarcinoma.

== Diagnosis ==
Clear-cell adenocarcinoma of the vagina is a rare cancer, occurring in up to 10% of primary vaginal malignancies. It is all but confirmed if maternal use of DES is established. Even though it was once thought to no longer occur past the age of 30, it is still seen in the 40s and 50s. Some of the main signs and symptoms for clear-cell adenocarcinoma of the vagina are spotting between menstrual cycles, bleeding post-menopause, abnormal bleeding, and malignant pericardial effusion or cardiac tamponade.

== Treatment ==
Low grade cancer is treated by surgical resection. High grade will require neoadjuvant chemotherapy and resection. Long-term surveillance will be required.

== History ==
In the late 1960s through 1971 a cluster of young women, from their teens into their twenties, was mysteriously diagnosed with clear-cell adenocarcinoma (CCA), a cancer not generally found in women until after menopause. Doctors at Massachusetts General Hospital eventually linked DES exposure before birth to the development of CCA in these young women. They determined the risk for developing CCA among DES daughters is estimated at 1 in a 1,000.

== See also ==
- Glassy-cell carcinoma of the cervix
- Vaginal melanoma
