= Gartner's duct cyst =

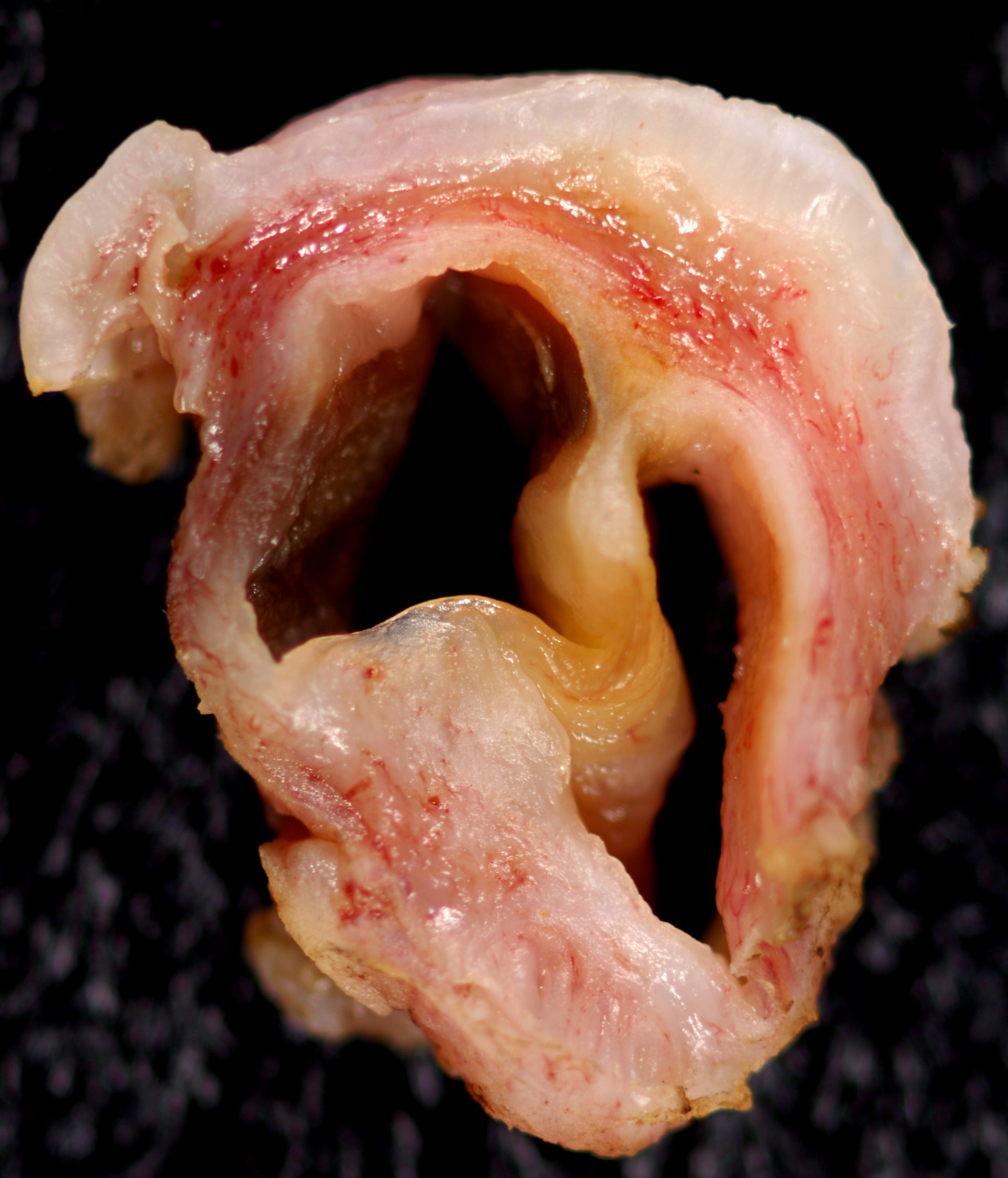
- Gross pathology of Gartner's duct cyst
- Specialty: Gynecology

A Gartner's duct cyst (sometimes incorrectly referred to as vaginal inclusion cyst) is a benign vaginal cyst that originates from the Gartner's duct, which is a vestigial remnant of the mesonephric duct (Wolffian duct) in females. They are typically small asymptomatic cysts that occur along the lateral walls of the vagina, following the course of the duct. They can present in adolescence with painful menstruation (dysmenorrhea) or difficulty inserting a tampon. They can also enlarge to substantial proportions and be mistaken for urethral diverticulum or cystocele. In some rare instances, they can be congenital.

There is a small association between Gartner's duct cysts and metanephric urinary anomalies, such as ectopic ureter and ipsilateral renal hypoplasia. Symptoms of a Gartner's duct cyst include: infections, bladder dysfunction, abdominal pain, vaginal discharge, and urinary incontinence.

The size of the cyst is usually less than 2 cm. On T2-weighted imaging, it manifests as hyperintense signal as most of its contents are fluid in nature. If the contents of the cyst are blood or proteinous, it will show high T1 signal and low T2 signal.
