= Progesterone devices used in farm animals =

Progesterone devices are broadly used in the control of reproductive management in livestock. They work by increasing circulating plasma progesterone levels with the following consequences:

1. Progesterone suppresses the secretion of gonadotropin-releasing hormone (GnRH) from the hypothalamus. This is done via a negative feedback to the hypothalamus neuroendocrine cells, by inhibition of KiSSpeptin KiSS1-derived peptide receptor, a protein needed for the release of GnRH.
2. Low levels of GnRH prevent the emergence of a dominant follicle by reducing the release of LH and FSH hormones. Current follicular waves cease and a new wave emerges 3–5 days after implant.
3. A dominant follicle develops but there is no ovulation as LH release is prevented by suppression of GnRH.
4. Removal of progesterone device produces a surge of GnRH, generating a pulse of LH that induces ovulation.

== Methods of progesterone administration ==
- Progesterone Releasing Intravaginal Device (PRID). For use in cattle and buffalo. They consist on a stainless spiral coil coated with an inert silicone rubber matrix impregnated in progesterone (1.55g). It has a nylon string that is placed hanging out of the vagina. Tying a loop on the string can facilitate removal of the device in the event the string is shortened to prevent rogue heifers or cows pulling them out. The coil has been commercially available since the mid-1970s. It originally included a capsule of oestradiol valerate. The use of oestrogens in the food producing industry in the EU was banned in 1981 because of their suggested carcinogenic effects. These substances are still approved for use in the US and many other countries, including Australia and Canada. The coil is licensed to use with fixed time artificial insemination
- Controlled Internal Drug Release (CIDR). For use in cattle and buffalo. This is a T-shaped silicone elastomer device impregnated in progesterone (1.38g). It has a plastic tail to ease removal.

The curve of plasma progesterone in ovariectomised cows fitted with either PRID or CIDR show similar overall levels with a more obvious initial peak in the coil versus the t-shaped device. It has been suggested that this increased level of plasma progesterone is due to optimal contact of the coil with the vaginal walls. Some heifers resent insertion of either device as it involves penetration of the hymen.

Device retention is high (around 98%) in both PRID and CIRD. Reasons for loss include overlubrication, pneumovagina, rogue cows pulling out the nylon string or plastic tail and slack cows, large breeds after several calvings.

=== Other devices ===
- Progestogen ear implant.
- Progestogen impregnated intravaginal sponge. For use mainly in sheep.

== Clinical uses of Progesterone devices ==
- Synchronisation of oestrus in conjunction with prostaglandin F2α. The PGF2α injection helps to ensure there is no residual CL and the potentially ovulating follicle has been held primed for less time, enhancing its viability. Protocol: Progesterone for 9 days. PGF2α injection on days 5–8. Serve on observed oestrus or fixed time once at 56h or twice at 48h and 72h.
- Induction of oestrus in anoestrus cows.
- Treatment of follicular cysts
- Persistent ovarian follicles
- Improve oocyte quality
- Reduction of early embryonic death and improved fertility
- Treatment of repeat breeders
- Increased fertility in embryo transfer protocols
