= Sarcoma botryoides =

Childhood soft-tissue cancer in mucosa-lined organs

- Other names: Botryoid rhabdomyosarcoma
- Specialty: Oncology

Sarcoma botryoides or botryoid sarcoma is a subtype of embryonal rhabdomyosarcoma, that can be observed in the walls of hollow, mucosa lined structures such as the nasopharynx, common bile duct, urinary bladder of infants and young children or the vagina in females, typically younger than age 8. The name comes from Ancient Greek botryoid 'grape bunch' due to their gross appearance.

== Presentation ==
For botryoid rhabdomyosarcoma of the vagina, the most common clinical finding is vaginal bleeding but vaginal bleeding is not specific for sarcoma botryoides: other vaginal cancers are possible. They may appear as a polypoid mass, somewhat yellow in color and are friable: thus, they (possibly) may break off, leading to vaginal bleeding or infections.

== Histology ==
Under the microscope one can see rhabdomyoblasts that may contain cross-striations. Tumor cells are crowded in a distinct layer beneath the vaginal epithelium (cambium layer). Spindle-shaped tumor cells that are desmin positive.

== Treatment ==
The disease used to be uniformly fatal, with a 5-year survival rate between 10 and 35%. As a result, treatment was radical surgery. New multidrug chemotherapy regimens with or without radiation therapy are now used in combination with less radical surgery with good results, although outcome data are not yet available.

== Epidemiology ==
Sarcoma botryoides normally is found in children under 8 years of age. Onset of symptoms occurs at age 3 years (38.3 months) on average. Cases of older women with this condition have also been reported.
