= Glassy cell carcinoma of the cervix =

- Other names: Glassy cell carcinoma
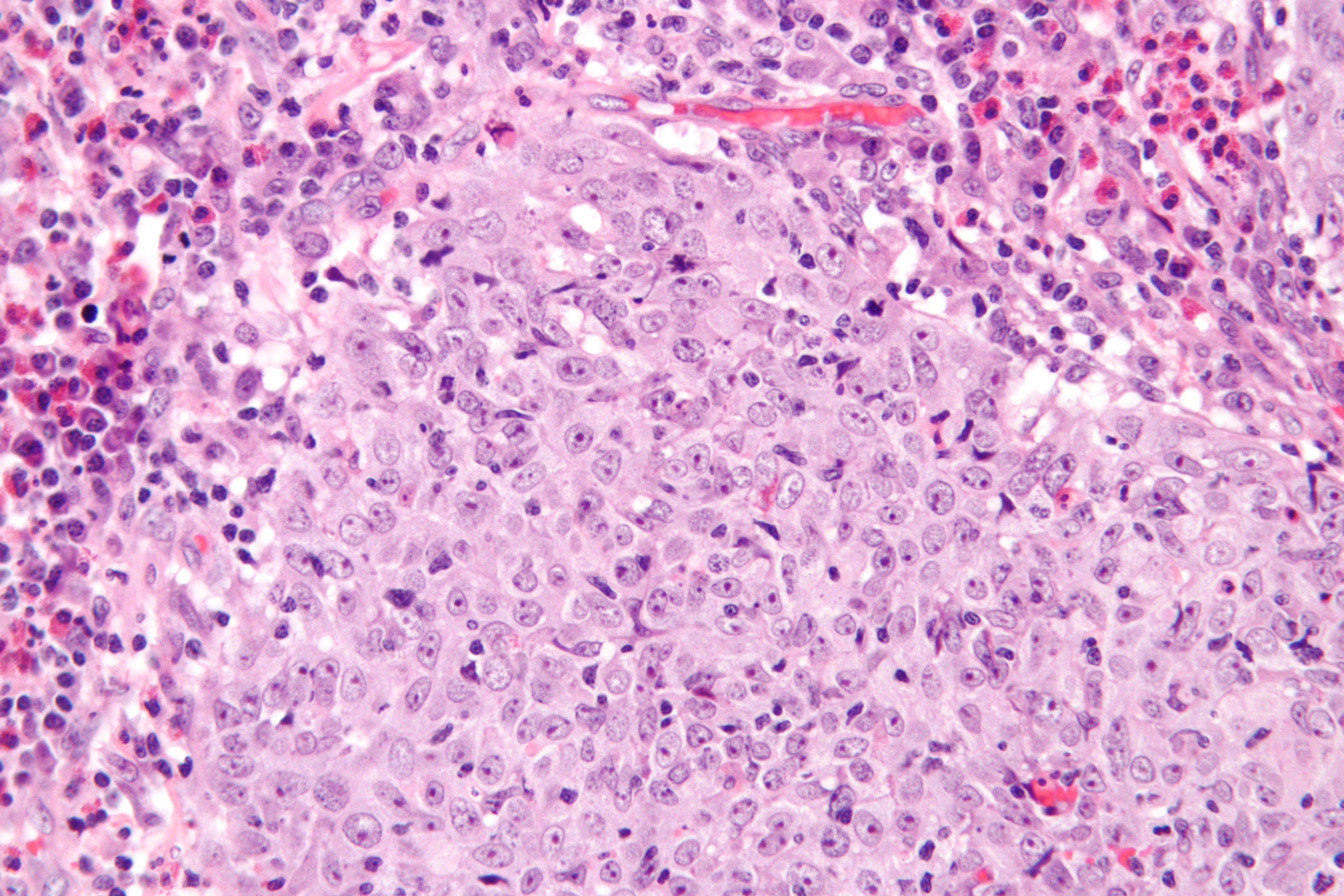
- Micrograph of a glassy cell carcinoma of the cervix. H&E stain.
- Specialty: Oncology

Glassy cell carcinoma of the cervix, also glassy cell carcinoma, is a rare aggressive malignant tumour of the uterine cervix. The tumour gets its name from its microscopic appearance; its cytoplasm has a glass-like appearance.

== Signs and symptoms ==
The signs and symptoms are similar to other cervical cancers and may include post-coital bleeding and/or pain during intercourse (dyspareunia). Early lesions may be completely asymptomatic.

== Diagnosis ==
The diagnosis is based on tissue examination, e.g. biopsy.

Under the microscope, glassy cell carcinoma tumours are composed of cells with a glass-like cytoplasm, typically associated with an inflammatory infiltrate abundant in eosinophils and very mitotically active. PAS staining highlights the plasma membrane.

== Treatment ==
The treatment is dependent on the stage. Advanced tumours are treated with surgery (radical hysterectomy and bilateral salpingo-opherectomy), radiation therapy and chemotherapy.

== See also ==
- Cervix
- Cervical cancer
- Villoglandular adenocarcinoma

== Additional images ==
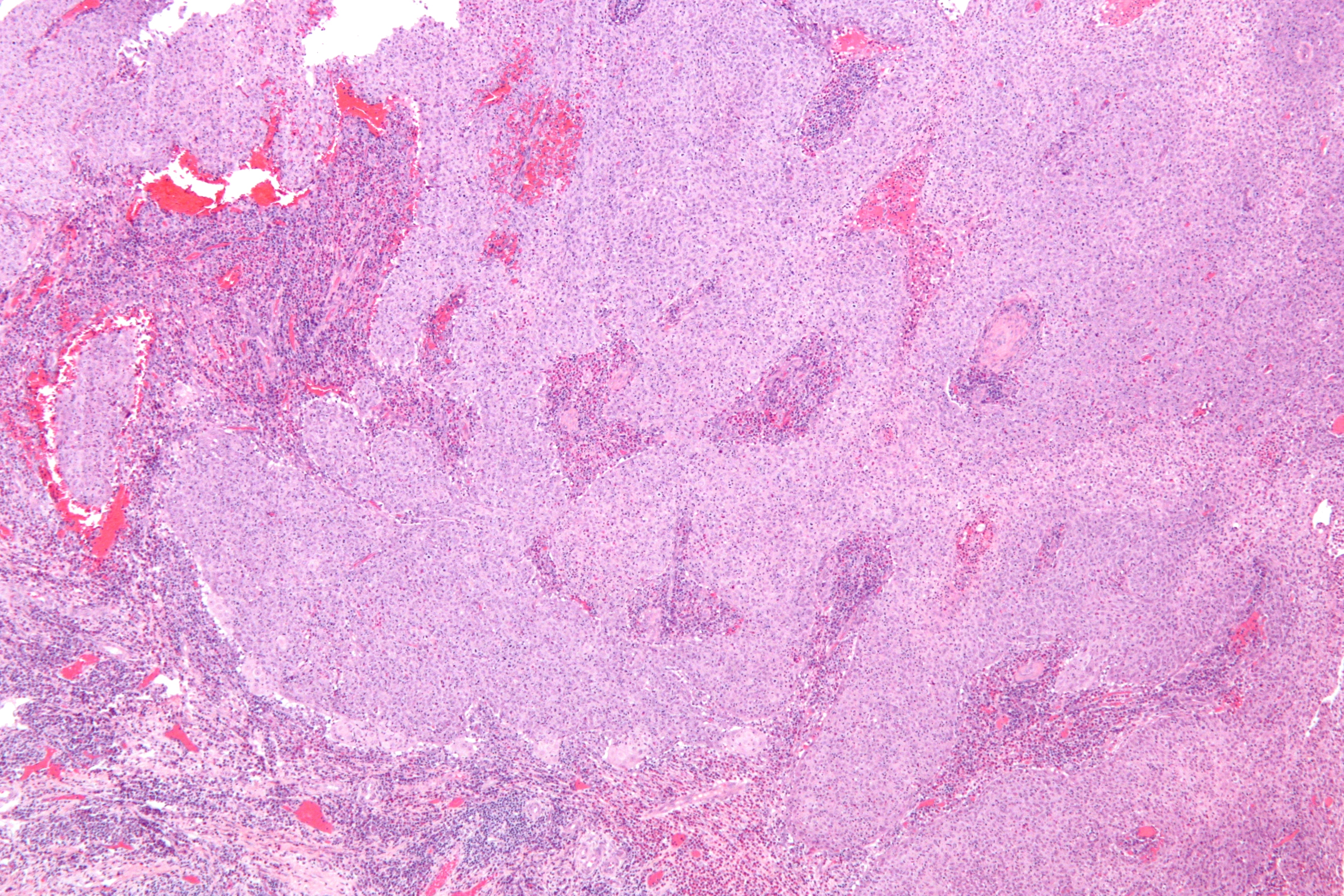
Low mag.

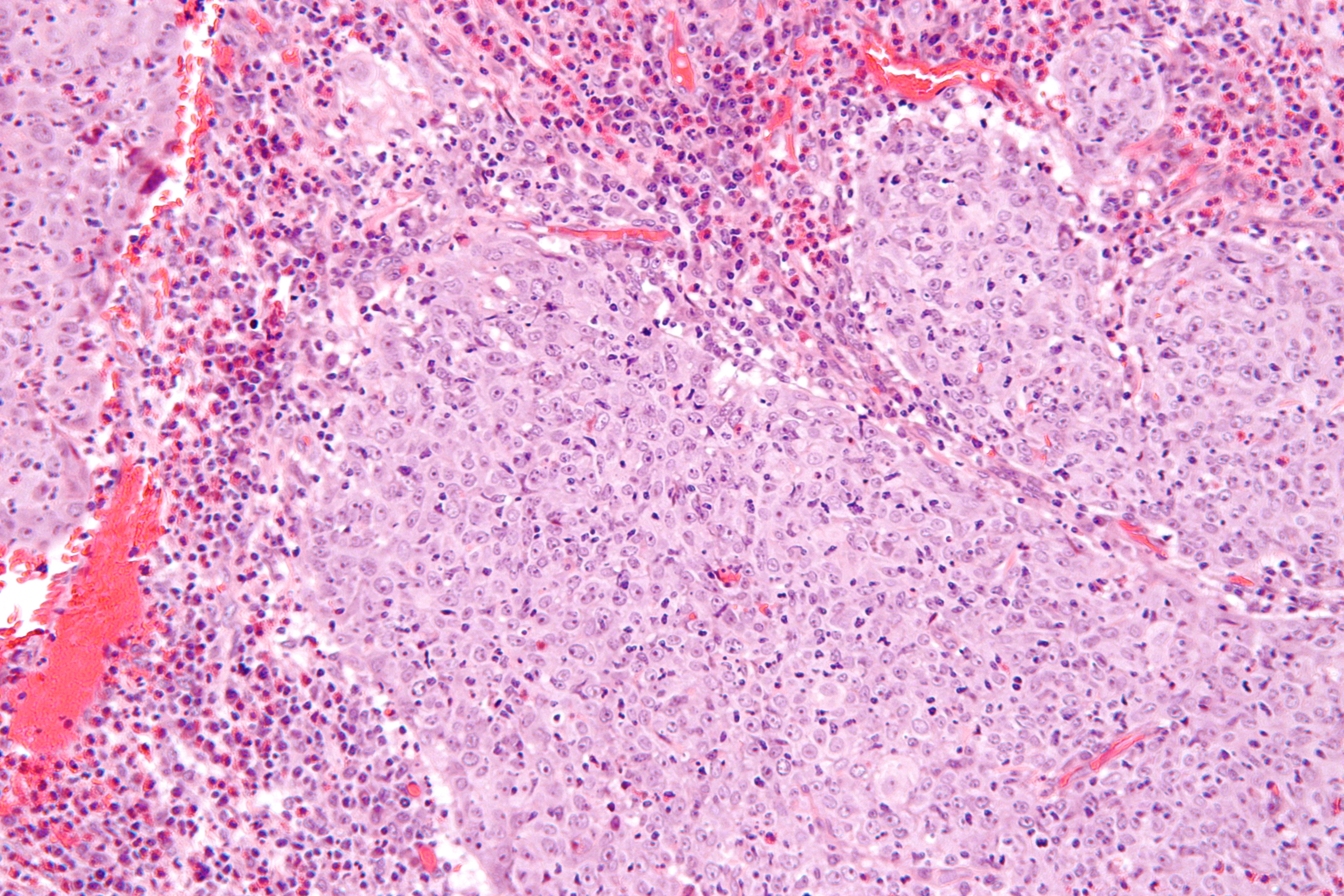
High mag.
