= Vaginal cysts =

Benign growths of the vaginal epithelium

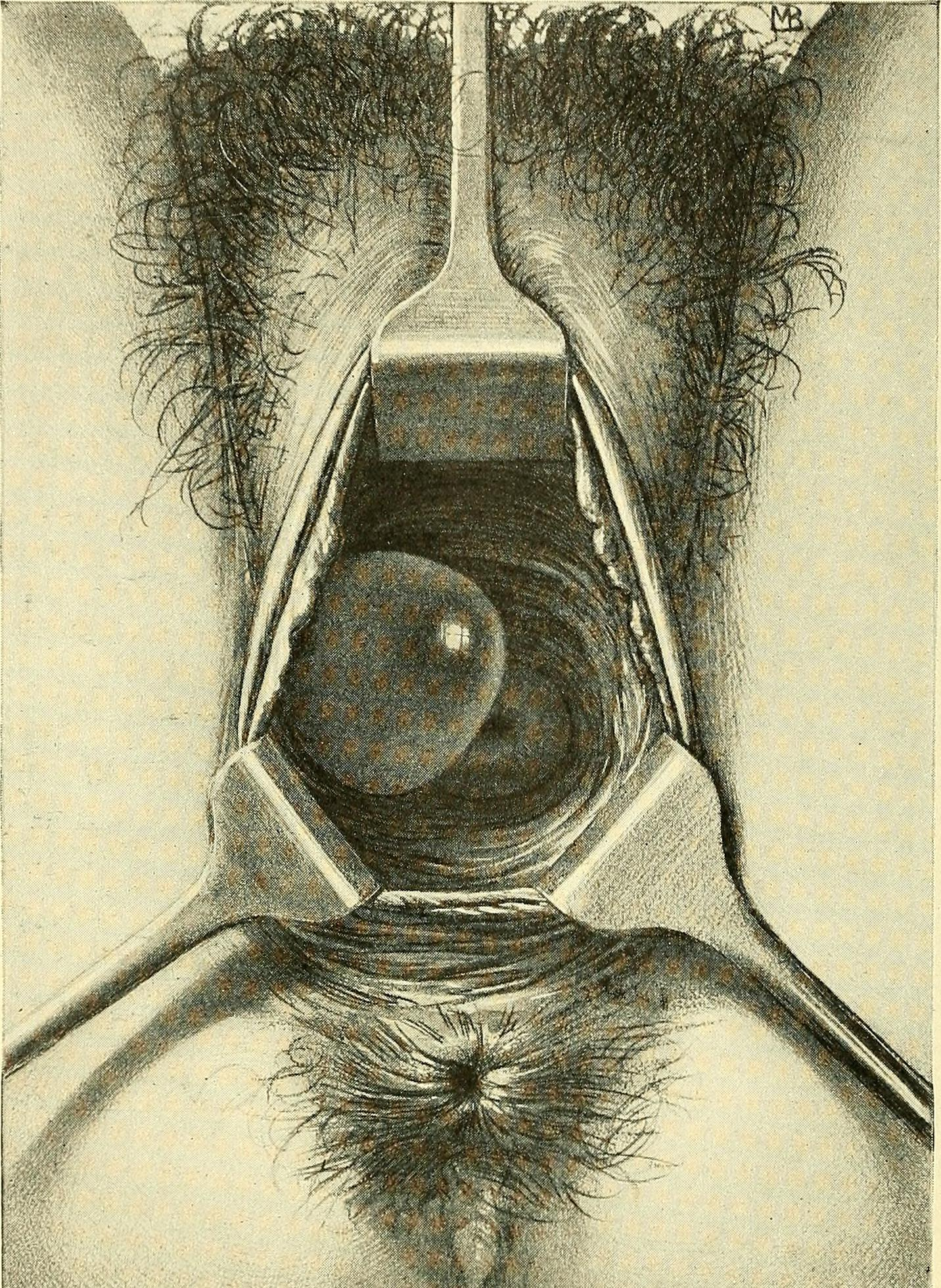
A 1906 illustration of a Gartner cyst on the vaginal wall

Vaginal cysts are uncommon benign cysts that develop in the vaginal wall. The type of epithelial tissue lining a cyst is used to classify these growths. They can be congenital. They can present in childhood and adulthood. The most common type is the squamous inclusion cyst. It develops within vaginal tissue present at the site of an episiotomy or other vaginal surgical sites. In most instances they do not cause symptoms and present with few or no complications. A vaginal cyst can develop on the surface of the vaginal epithelium or in deeper layers. Often, they are found by the woman herself and as an incidental finding during a routine pelvic examination. Vaginal cysts can mimic other structures that protrude from the vagina such as a rectocele and cystocele. Some cysts can be distinguished visually but most will need a biopsy to determine the type. Vaginal cysts can vary in size and can grow as large as 7 cm. Other cysts can be present on the vaginal wall though mostly these can be differentiated. Vaginal cysts can often be palpated (felt) by a clinician. Vaginal cysts are one type of vaginal mass, others include cancers and tumors. The prevalence of vaginal cysts is uncertain since many go unreported but it is estimated that 1 out of 200 women have a vaginal cyst. Vaginal cysts may initially be discovered during pregnancy and childbirth. These are then treated to provide an unobstructed delivery of the infant. Growths that originate from the urethra and other tissue can present as cysts of the vagina.

== Types ==
Vaginal inclusion cysts can appear as small bumps and can develop during childbirth, or after surgery. A squamous inclusion cyst can rarely be found in a newborn. Other cysts can be Bartholin's cysts, Gartner's duct cysts, mucous inclusions, epithelial inclusion cysts, embryonic cysts and urothelial cysts. Less common vaginal cysts are endometrial cysts and vaginitis emphysematosa. Vaginitis emphysematosum is a group of gas-filled cysts on the vaginal wall; these are benign and self-limiting (resolve on their own). Vaginal cysts can also be congenital and associated with urinary system anomalies

The most common type of vaginal cyst are Müllerian cysts. These usually develop on the anterolateral vaginal wall. This cyst can be lined with epithelium from the cervix, uterus and fallopian tubes.

An epithelial inclusion cyst is also referred to as epidermal inclusion cyst or squamous inclusion cyst. This type of cyst comprises 23% of all vaginal cysts and is the second most common. This cyst originates from epithelium tissue that has been 'trapped' from surgery, episiotomy, or other trauma. It is most often found on the lower posterior vaginal wall. An epidermoid cyst is one type of vaginal cyst. Inclusion cysts are small and located on the posterior, lower end of the vagina. Small pieces of vaginal epithelium are trapped beneath the surface due to perineal lacerations and imperfect surgical repair after an episiotomy.

A Gartner's duct cyst develops from a small tissue remnant of the mesonephric duct. Symptoms include: infection, bladder dysfunction, abdominal pain, vaginal discharge, and urinary incontinence. It is often large enough to cause urinary incontinence but surgical removal provides treatment and recurrence is unlikely. Diagnosis is confirmed with ultrasound imaging. The evaluation by biopsy provides the most accurate diagnosis. This cyst has a lining of epithelial tissue that varies from squamous to mucin-secreting transitional epithelium.

Occasionally, a parasitic infection causes a vaginal cyst.

== Signs and symptoms ==
In most instances, symptoms are minimal or absent. Some women may experience vaginal pressure, discomfort, swelling, painful sex, or bleeding. Cysts can also be sensitive and tender to the touch.

== Diagnosis ==
Diagnosis is aided by the use of ultrasound, CT scan, voiding cystourethrogram, and MRI. Ultrasound findings may be the visualization of smooth margins of a fluid-filled structure. Vaginal cysts resemble other structures that protrude from the vagina such as rectocele and cystocele. Histological assessment is needed to determine the specific type of cyst. Vaginal cysts are often discovered during a routine pelvic exam or pap smear. Cysts are also discovered during a bimanual exam. Other structures that resemble vaginal cysts are connective tissue tumors, hematocolpos, and hymenal atresia. The absence of vaginal rugae over the cyst is a clue to their presence.

== Treatment ==
Many cysts remain small, are followed closely by a clinician, and resolve on their own. Surgery and/or drainage is performed to remove the cyst. Treatment continues after the surgical removal by scheduled followups with the medical provider who looks for changes in the cyst. Bartholin gland cysts often need to be drained. Sometimes, antibiotics are prescribed to treat them as well. Treatment for these usually includes aspiration, marsupialisation and deroofing. When cysts are treated complications are few. Vaginal cysts rarely recur. When surgically removed, the cysts usually do not return. In some cases a Bartholin cyst can develop and need further treatment. In most cases, there are no complications from the cysts themselves. A surgical removal carries a small risk of complication. The risk depends on where the cyst is located.

== See also ==
- Nabothian cyst
- Paraovarian cyst
- Vaginal tumors
- Vaginal anomalies
