= Urethral caruncle =

- Specialty: Urology

A urethral caruncle is a benign cutaneous condition characterized by distal urethral lesions that are most commonly found in post-menopausal women. They appear red, and can be various sizes. They can have the appearance of a tumor. These epidermal growths are found around the posterior portion of the urethral meatus. They can bleed and occasionally cause dysuria and dyspareunia. The caruncles can be removed by surgery, electric cauterization and then with suture repair. Pathology studies are necessary to distinguish carcinoma of the urethra from urethral caruncles. Caruncles can grow back in some instances. Urethral caruncles can accompany the skin changes related to lowered estrogen levels. They can become a source of chronic hematuria, infection, and urethritis.

== See also ==
- Unilateral palmoplantar verrucous nevus
