= Squamous cell carcinoma of the vagina =

- Female reproductive anatomy with layers of the vaginal wall shown
- Specialty: Oncology, Gynecology
- Symptoms: irregular vaginal bleeding, lump in the vagina, pain in the vaginal area, pain with intercourse, pain with urination, constipation
- Types: keratinizing, nonkeratinizing, basaloid, warty
- Risk factors: HPV infection, smoking, early age at first sexual intercourse, multiple sex partners, age over 60
- Diagnostic method: pelvic exam, biopsy

Squamous cell carcinoma of the vagina is a potentially invasive type of cancer that forms in the tissues of the vagina. Though uncommonly diagnosed, squamous cell cancer of the vagina (SCCV) is the most common type of vaginal cancer, accounting for 80-90% of cases as well as 2% of all gynecological cancers. SCCV forms in squamous cells, which are the thin, flat cells lining the vagina. SCCV initially spreads superficially within the vaginal wall and can slowly spread to invade other vaginal tissues. Because of its slow growth, this cancer may cause no symptoms, or it may present with signs like irregular bleeding, pain, or a vaginal mass. This carcinoma can metastasize to the lungs or less frequently, to the liver, bone, or other sites. SCCV has many risk factors in common with cervical cancer and is similarly strongly associated with infection with oncogenic strains of human papillomavirus (HPV). Diagnosis of SCCV is done by pelvic exam and biopsy of the tissue. Treatment and prognosis will depend on the stage, location, and characteristics of the cancer.

== Signs and symptoms ==
SCCV may not cause any signs or symptoms in its early stages. The most common symptom people experience due to SCCV is vaginal bleeding, often in women who have already gone through menopause and no longer have monthly periods or after sexual intercourse. A mass or lump in the vagina may also be noticed and can cause pain during sexual intercourse. If the disease has grown or spread from the vagina, it can lead to pain in the pelvic area, pain when urinating, and/or constipation.

== Risk factors ==
SCCV is often found alongside human papillomavirus (HPV) infection, similar to cervical cancer. Because of this association, risk factors for HPV infection also increase the risk of SCCV. These factors include early age at first sexual intercourse, multiple sex partners, and smoking. SCCV also becomes more common as age increases, with the average age of individuals affected being around 60 years old. Other factors that have been found to increase the risk of SCCV include history of malignant cervical cancer, alcohol consumption, and low socioeconomic status.

== Diagnosis ==
Diagnosis of SCCV is made by histologic appearance of a biopsy from the vagina and lack of history of a gynecological cancer that may have recurred and spread into the vagina. In order to diagnose SCCV, a doctor must perform a complete assessment of medical history and a physical examination. A pelvic exam with a speculum is needed in order to fully visualize the vagina and look for any irregularities or masses, which would then be biopsied. This also allows the doctor to exclude more benign causes of symptoms associated with SCCV. A bimanual exam is also often done to evaluate for other pelvic masses, and a rectovaginal exam may be performed to assess for spread of the cancer to the rectum. Other diagnostic procedures that can be used to evaluate for SCCV include a Pap smear, colposcopy, and vaginal cytology. Once diagnosed, chest x-ray and skeletal radiology are done to determine staging of the cancer. CT scan (CAT scan), MRI (magnetic resonance imaging), and PET scan (positron emission tomography scan) may be done as well to help plan treatment.

== Treatment ==
Treatment will vary depending on staging, where the cancer is located, whether the patient has a uterus or has had a hysterectomy to have it removed, and whether the patient has previously received radiation treatment to the pelvis. Diagnostic imaging is used to determine staging and plan treatment. Treatment generally consists of radiation therapy, either administered via external beam radiotherapy or brachytherapy. Chemotherapy can also be used along with radiation therapy, particularly with later-stage cases. Surgical treatment of SCCV is uncommon but may be utilized for early-stage cases that can feasibly be fully removed in an operation. After treatment is completed, surveillance for recurrence of SCCV should be done at least yearly. If the cancer does return, surgery may be curative and is regularly used. In recurrent disease, chemotherapy is often ineffective, so palliative care may be recommended if surgery cannot be completed.

== Prognosis ==
The prognosis for individuals with SCCV is dependent on the stage at the time of diagnosis, with lower stages having more favorable outcomes. Tumor size is also a significant factor affecting prognosis, with smaller tumors being better. Location in the vagina, histology, history of hysterectomy, and age may be influential factors, but the data for these variables is inconsistent.

== Epidemiology ==
Of all cases of gynecologic cancers, SCCV makes up less than 2% of cases, affecting less than 1 in 100,000 women despite making up 80-90% of all vaginal cancers. Approximately 3,000 new cases of SCCV are diagnosed every year in the United States. The average age at diagnosis is around 60, with SCCV becoming more common as age increases, but it can be found in adolescents and young adults as well. Black women are more likely to develop SCCV than white women, whereas Asian/Pacific Islander women are less likely to develop SCCV. SCCV appears to be more common in women who have had a hysterectomy as well as those who experience pelvic organ prolapse.
