= Katherine A. Hoadley =

American breast cancer researcher

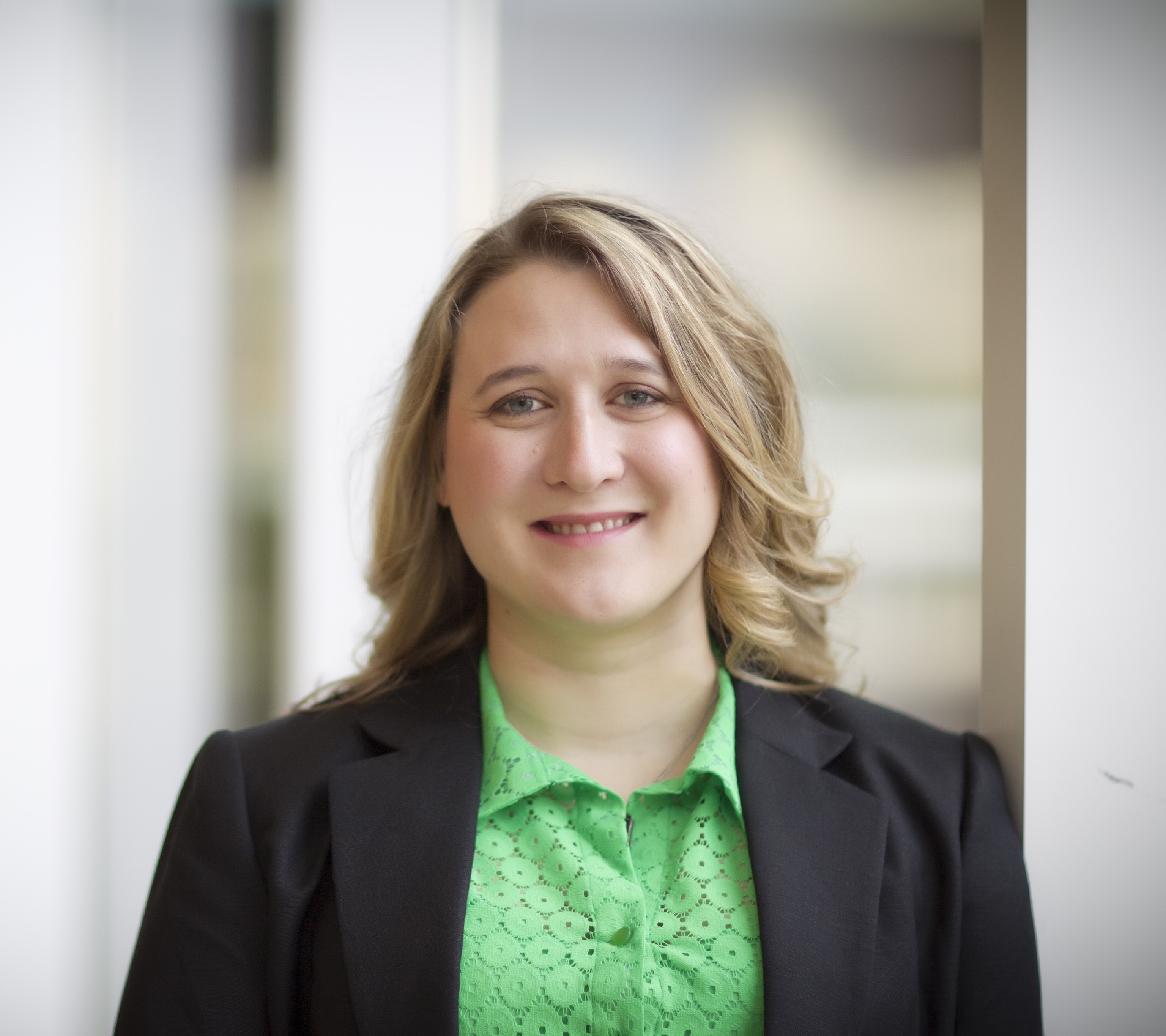
- Born: Shepherdstown, West Virginia, US

Academic background
- Education: BA, BS, Chemistry and Biology, 2001, West Virginia Wesleyan College; PhD, 2006, Genetics and Molecular Biology, University of North Carolina at Chapel Hill
- Thesis: Development of biologically based therapies for basal-like breast tumors (2006)

Katherine A. Hoadley is an American breast cancer researcher. As of 2017, she has served as the Associate Director of Cancer Genomics for the High-Throughput Sequencing Facility at UNC Lineberger Comprehensive Cancer Center. Her research is focused on understanding the biology of cancer through gene expression analyses and integrative genomic approaches.

== Early life and education ==
Hoadley was born and raised in Shepherdstown, West Virginia to a toxicologist father. Her first job was at the United States Department of Agriculture at the age of 16 doing plant research. Hoadley earned her Bachelor of Arts and Bachelor of Science degree from the West Virginia Wesleyan College in 2001 where she also competed in track and field. She later earned her PhD from the University of North Carolina at Chapel Hill (UNC) in 2006.

== Career ==
Upon completing her PhD, Hoadley continued to study the complexity of breast cancer as a Research Assistant Professor at UNC. While serving in this role, she worked alongside D. Neil Hayes to document four molecular subtypes of squamous cell cancer for the first time. In 2011, she was the inaugural co-recipient with Carey K. Anders of the new Weatherspoon Family Brain Tumor Research Award for her contributions to the analysis of glioblastomas. The following year, Hoadley co-led a clinical trial testing a combination therapy for basal-like breast cancer which found that a combination of two drugs with promising preclinical results was not as effective as previously believed.

A few years later, Hoadley was a lead researcher at The Cancer Genome Atlas (TCGA) which analyzed over 3,500 tumors across 12 different tissue types to see how they compared to one another. The results of the study found that one in ten cancers analyzed would be classified differently using their new approach. In 2015, she helped identify a group of women with HER2 positive breast cancer who could benefit from less intensive targeted treatment using molecular profiling of patients’ breast cancer tumors. Upon publishing the results, researchers said the findings "could spare unnecessary treatment for those patients and help save health care dollars". Hoadley also found that 51 percent of patients had high expression levels of genes predominately expressed by immune cell subsets.

In 2016, Hoadley co-identified a particular gene expression pattern in normal-appearing breast tissue around tumors that was linked to lower survival rates for women with estrogen receptor-positive breast cancer. As a result of her research, she received a grant from the Susan G. Komen for the Cure organization "to study the genetic and immune cell features of basal-like breast cancer, a poorly understood subtype of breast cancer." The following year, Hoadley was appointed Associate Director of Cancer Genomics for the High-Throughput Sequencing Facility and eventually named an assistant professor in UNC's Department of Genetics in 2019. Hoadley was promoted to associate professor in 2024.

In 2018, Hoadley was lead author of a study that analyzed 10,000 tumors from a variety of cancer types and discovered that many tumors are similar to each other based on cell type of origin. This research represents a major contribution to The Cancer Genome Atlas project (TCGA) which is a database of cancer mutations and is a widely referenced human genomic resource.

In 2026, Hoadley received an award from the Department of Defense for her research project focused on mapping molecular divergence in breast cancer metasis.

== Awards ==
During the COVID-19 pandemic in North America, Hoadley was the recipient of the Marion R. Wright Award for Scientific Excellence as "an exemplary researcher within the field of metastatic breast cancer within their first three years on faculty." Her work was also listed among the most influential scientific papers on Clarivate’s 2020 Highly Cited Researchers list.
