= Squamous-cell carcinoma =

Carcinoma that derives from squamous epithelial cells

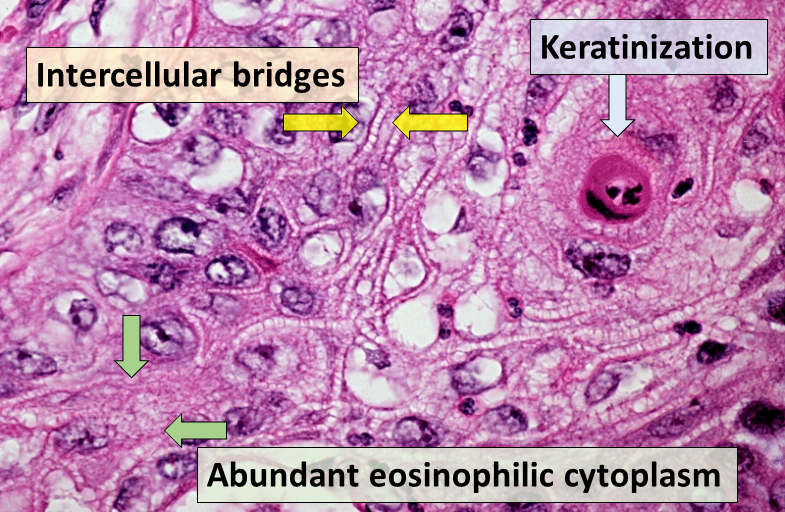
Main histopathology features of squamous-cell carcinoma

Squamous-cell carcinoma (SCC), also known as epidermoid carcinoma, comprises a number of different types of cancer that begin in squamous cells. These cells form on the surface of the skin, on the lining of hollow organs in the body, and on the lining of the respiratory and digestive tracts.

The squamous-cell carcinomas of different body sites can show differences in their presented symptoms, natural history, prognosis, and response to treatment.

== By body location ==
Human papillomavirus infection has been associated with SCCs of the oropharynx, lung, fingers, and anogenital region.

=== Head and neck cancer ===
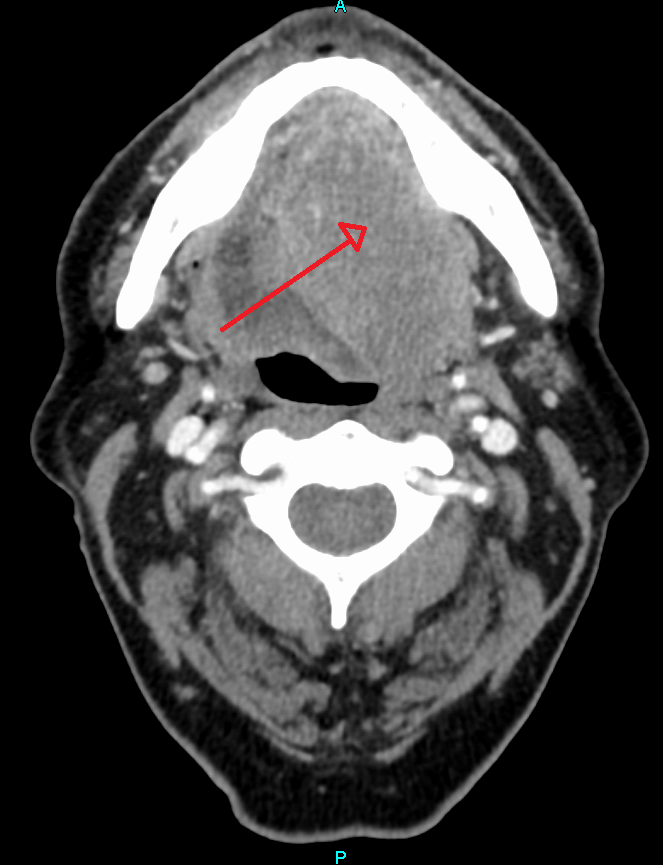
A large head and neck squamous-cell carcinoma of the tongue as seen on CT imaging

About 90% of cases of head and neck cancer (cancer of the mouth, nasal cavity, nasopharynx, throat and associated structures) are due to SCC.

=== Skin ===
Squamous-cell skin cancer is the second most common skin cancer, accounting for over 1 million cases in the United States each year.

=== Thyroid ===
Primary squamous-cell carcinoma of the thyroid shows an aggressive biological phenotype resulting in poor prognosis for patients.

=== Esophagus ===
Esophageal cancer may be due to either esophageal squamous-cell carcinoma (ESCC) or adenocarcinoma (EAC). SCCs tend to occur closer to the mouth, while adenocarcinomas occur closer to the stomach. Dysphagia (difficulty swallowing, solids worse than liquids) and painful swallowing are common initial symptoms. If the disease is localized, surgical removal of the affected esophagus may offer the possibility of a cure. If the disease has spread, chemotherapy and radiotherapy are commonly used.

=== Lung ===
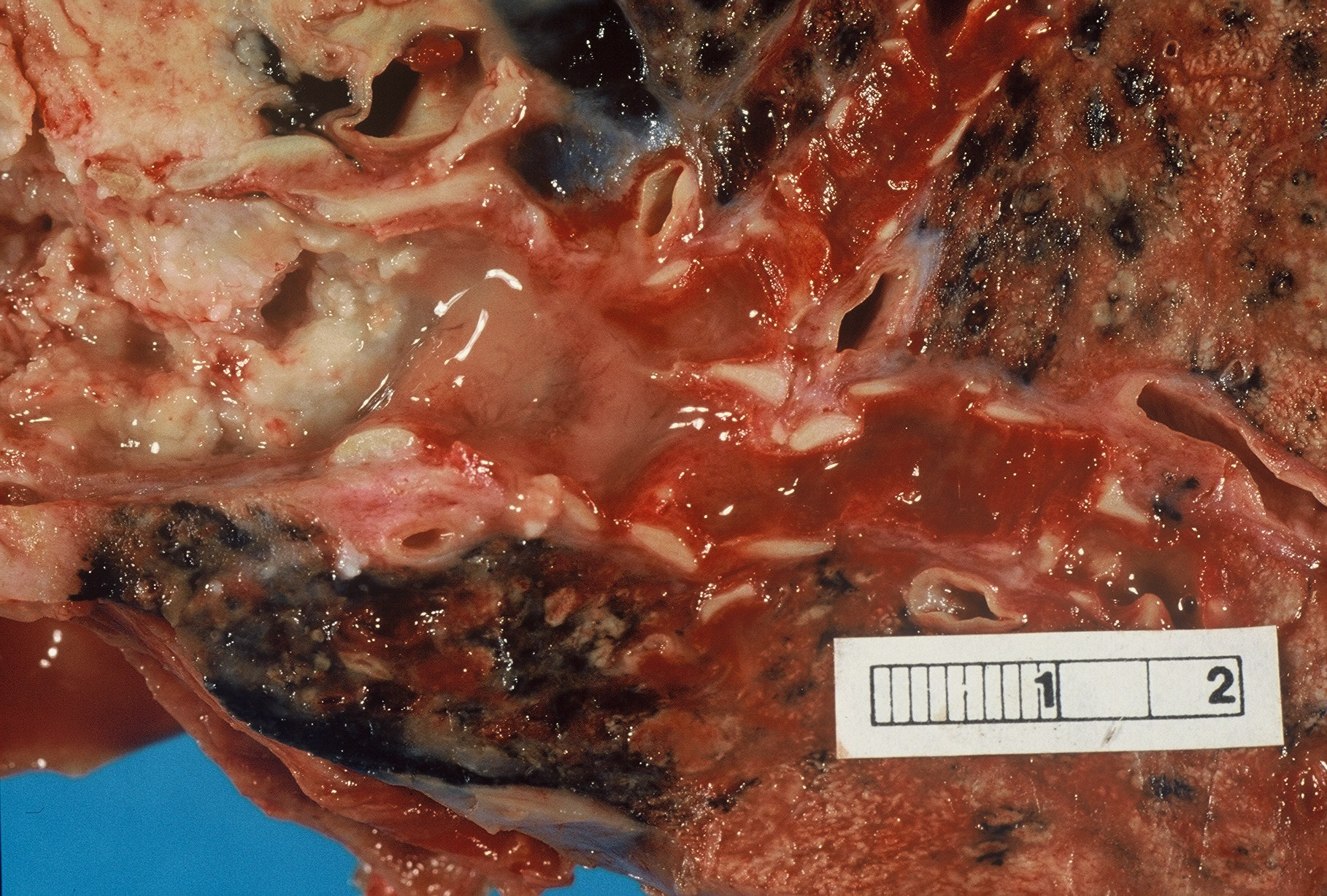
Photograph of a squamous-cell carcinoma. The tumour is on the left, obstructing the bronchus (lung); beyond the tumour, the bronchus is inflamed and contains mucus.

When associated with the lung, it is typically a centrally located large-cell cancer (non-small-cell lung cancer). It often has a paraneoplastic syndrome causing ectopic production of parathyroid hormone-related protein, resulting in hypercalcemia, but paraneoplastic syndrome is more commonly associated with small-cell lung cancer. It is primarily due to smoking.

=== Penis ===
Human papillomavirus (HPV), primarily HPV 16 and 18, are strongly implicated in the development of SCC of the penis. Three carcinomas in situ are associated with SCCs of the penis:

1. Bowen's disease presents as leukoplakia on the shaft. Around a third of cases progress to SCC.
2. Erythroplasia of Queyrat, a variation of Bowen's disease, presents as erythroplakia on the glans.
3. Bowenoid papulosis, which histologically resembles Bowen disease, presents as reddish papules.

=== Prostate ===
When associated with the prostate, squamous-cell carcinoma is very aggressive. It is difficult to detect as no increase in prostate-specific antigen levels is seen, meaning that the cancer is often diagnosed at an advanced stage.

=== Scrotum ===
Chimney sweeps' carcinoma is a squamous cell carcinoma of the skin of the scrotum.

=== Vagina and cervix ===
Squamous cell carcinoma of the vagina spreads slowly and usually stays near the vagina, but may spread to the lungs and liver. This is the most common type of vaginal cancer.

=== Ovary ===
Ovarian squamous cell carcinoma (oSCC) or squamous ovarian carcinoma (SOC) is a rare tumor that accounts for 1% of ovarian cancers.

=== Bladder ===
Most bladder cancer is transitional cell, but bladder cancer associated with schistosomiasis or large bladder stone is often SCC.

=== Eye ===
Conjunctival squamous cell carcinoma and corneal intraepithelial neoplasia comprise ocular surface squamous neoplasia (OSSN).

== Diagnosis ==
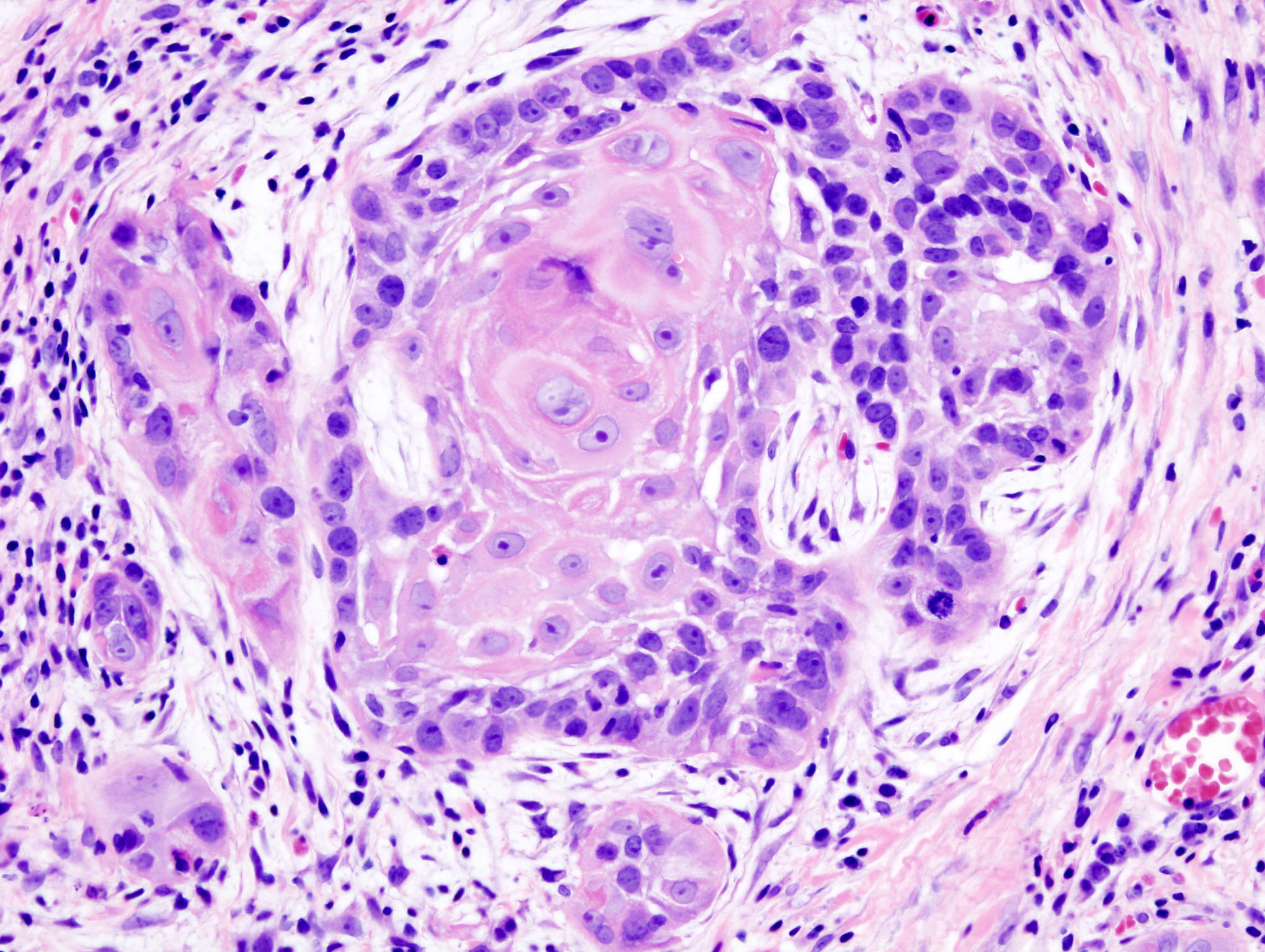
Biopsy of a highly differentiated squamous-cell carcinoma of the mouth. Typical squamous-cell carcinoma cells are large with abundant eosinophilic cytoplasm and large, often vesicular, nuclei. Haematoxylin & eosin stain

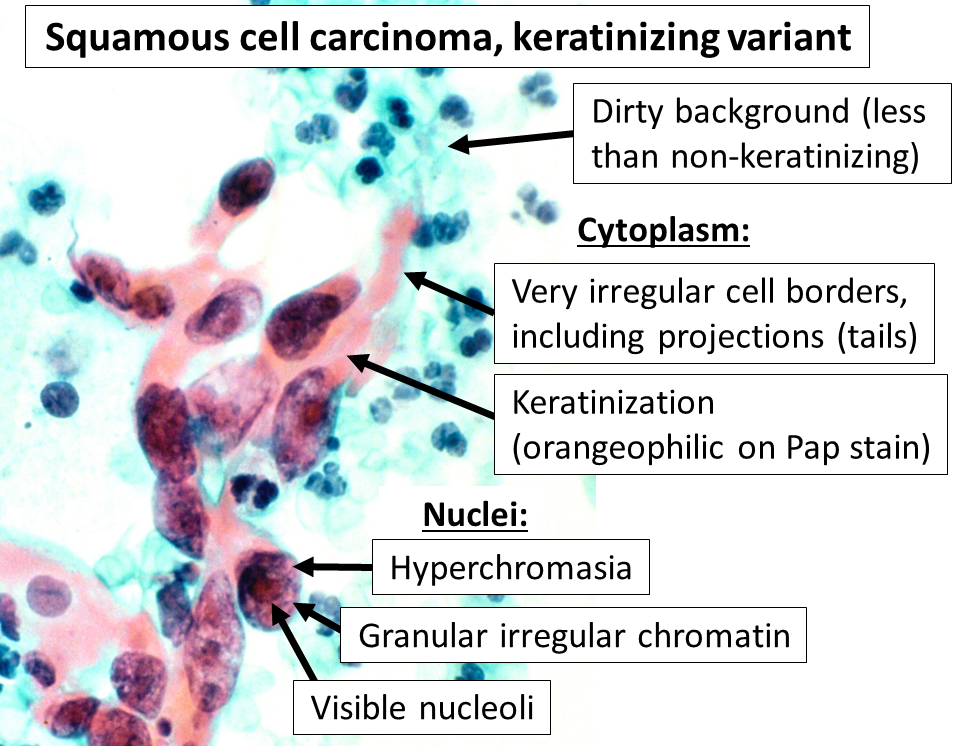
Cytopathology of squamous-cell carcinoma, keratinizing variant, with typical features. Pap stain.

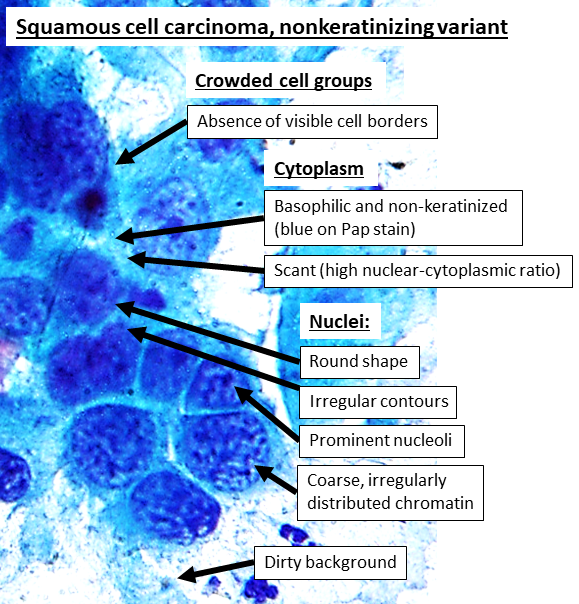
Cytopathology of squamous-cell carcinoma, nonkeratinizing variant, with typical features. Pap stain. Yet, these findings are overall less specific than for keratinizing squamous-cell carcinoma, and most can be seen in other cancers such as adenocarcinoma as well (which, however, tends to have fine chromatin).

Medical history, physical examination and medical imaging may suggest a squamous-cell carcinoma, but a biopsy for histopathology generally establishes the diagnosis. TP63 staining is the main histological marker for squamous-cell carcinoma. In addition, TP63 is an essential transcription factor to establish the identity of the squamous cells.

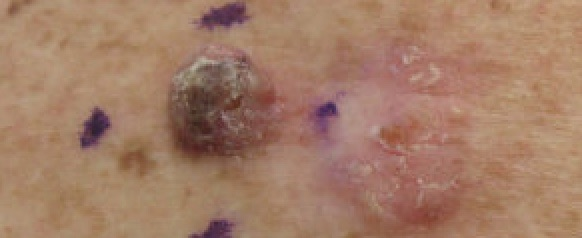
SCC well-differentiated, left upper paraspinal back marked for biopsy with adjacent actinic keratosis

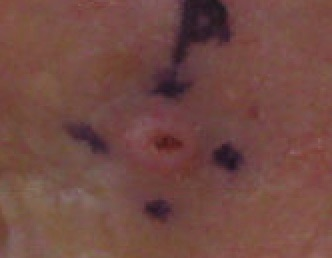
SCC, left lateral canthus marked for biopsy

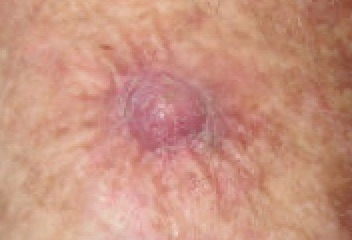
SCC, left ventral forearm

=== Classification ===
Cancer can be considered a very large and exceptionally heterogeneous family of malignant diseases, with squamous-cell carcinomas comprising one of the largest subsets. All SCC lesions are thought to begin via the repeated, uncontrolled division of cancer stem cells of epithelial lineage or characteristics. SCCs arise from squamous cells, which are flat cells that line many areas of the body. Some of which are keratinocytes. Accumulation of these cancer cells causes a microscopic focus of abnormal cells that are, at least initially, locally confined within the specific tissue in which the progenitor cell resided. This condition is called squamous-cell carcinoma in situ, and it is diagnosed when the tumor has not yet penetrated the basement membrane or other delimiting structure to invade adjacent tissues. Once the lesion has grown and progressed to the point where it has breached, penetrated, and infiltrated adjacent structures, it is referred to as "invasive" squamous-cell carcinoma. Once a carcinoma becomes invasive, it can spread to other organs and cause the formation of a metastasis, or "secondary tumor".

==== Other histopathologic subtypes ====
- Erythroplasia of Queyrat
- Marjolin's ulcer is a type of SCC that arises from a nonhealing ulcer or burn wound. More recent evidence, however, suggests that genetic differences exist between SCC and Marjolin's ulcer, which were previously underappreciated.

One method of classifying squamous-cell carcinomas is by their appearance under microscope. Subtypes may include:

- adenoid squamous-cell carcinoma (also known as pseudoglandular squamous-cell carcinoma) is characterized by a tubular microscopic pattern and keratinocyte acantholysis.
- basaloid squamous-cell carcinoma is mostly found in or near the tongue, tonsils, or larynx, but may also occur in the lung or elsewhere.
- clear-cell squamous-cell carcinoma (also known as clear-cell carcinoma of the skin) is characterized by keratinocytes that appear clear as a result of hydropic swelling.
- signet ring-cell squamous-cell carcinoma (occasionally rendered as signet ring-cell squamous-cell carcinoma) is a histological variant characterized by concentric rings composed of keratin and large vacuoles corresponding to markedly dilated endoplasmic reticulum. These vacuoles grow to such an extent that they radically displace the cell nucleus toward the cell membrane, giving the cell a distinctive superficial resemblance to a "signet ring" when viewed under a microscope.
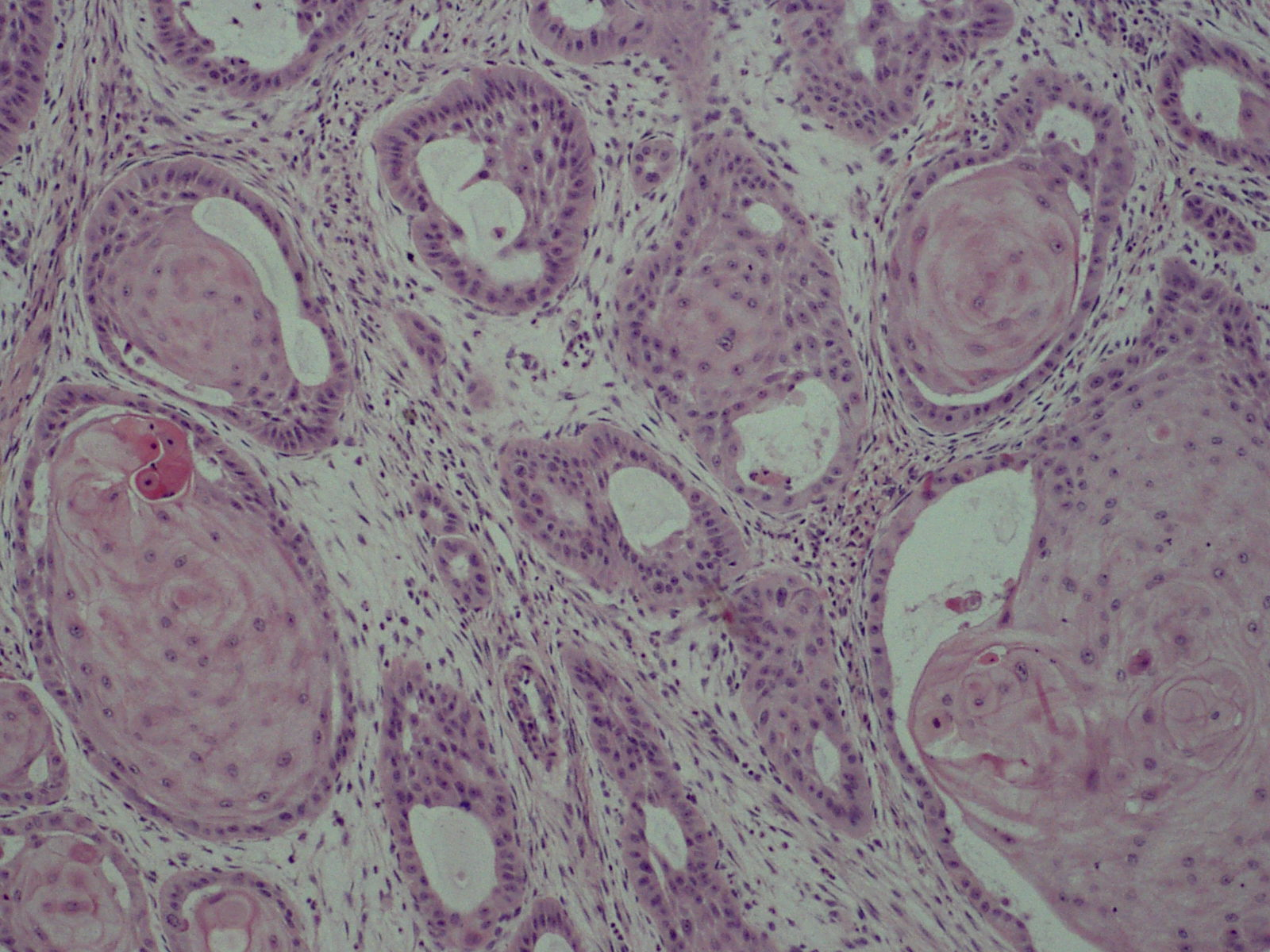
Adenoid squamous-cell carcinoma

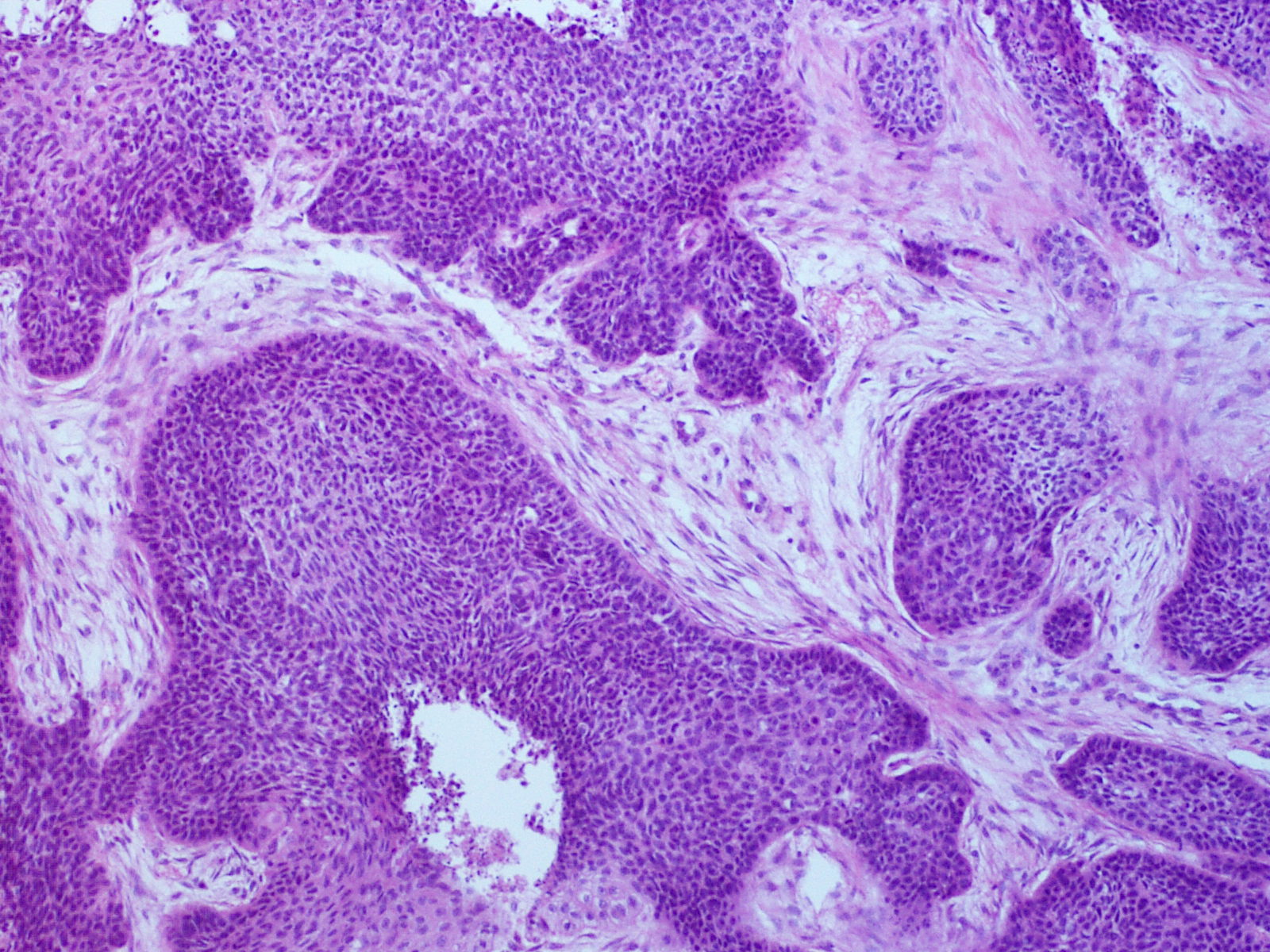
Basaloid squamous-cell carcinoma

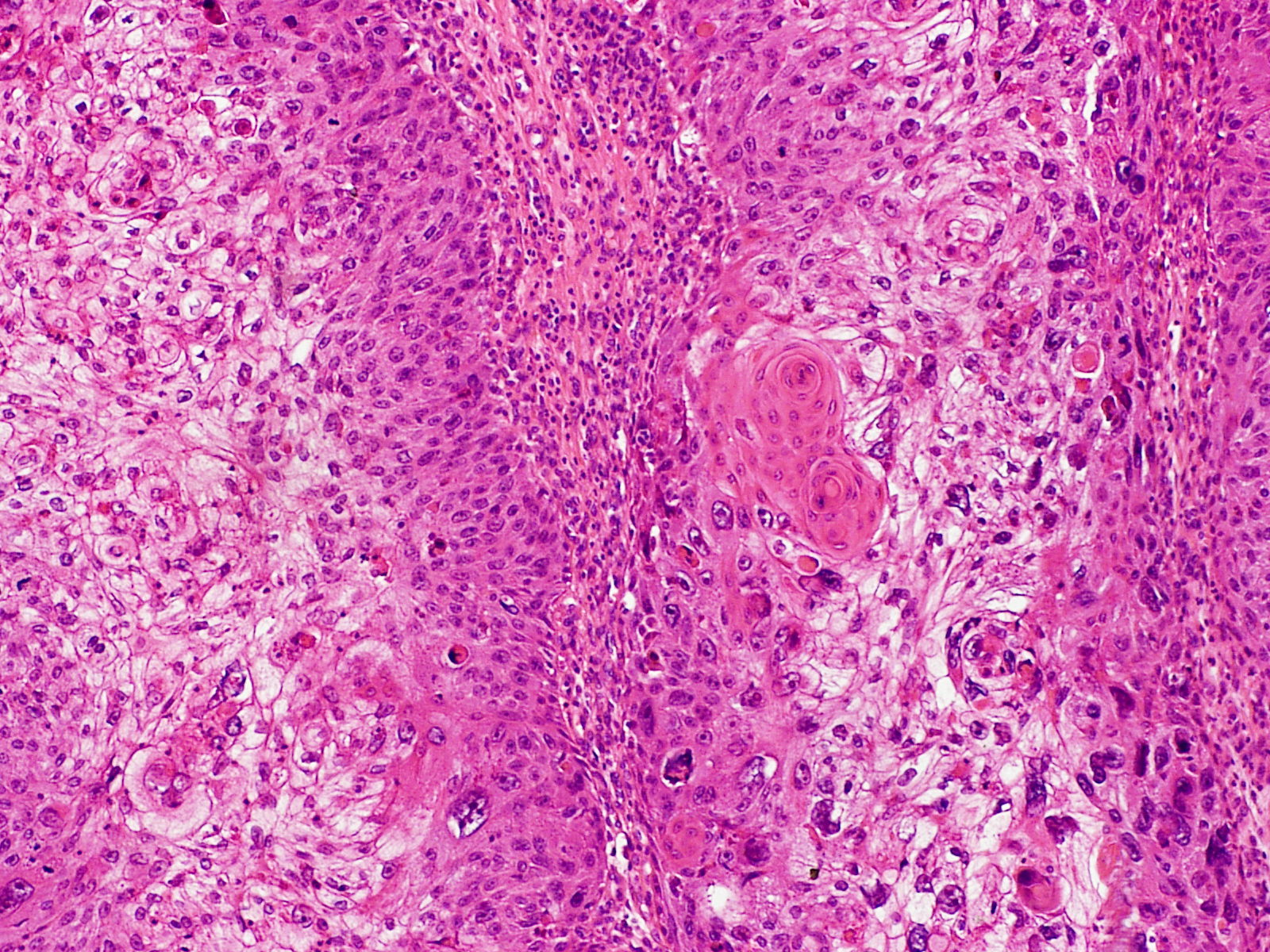
Clear-cell squamous-cell carcinoma

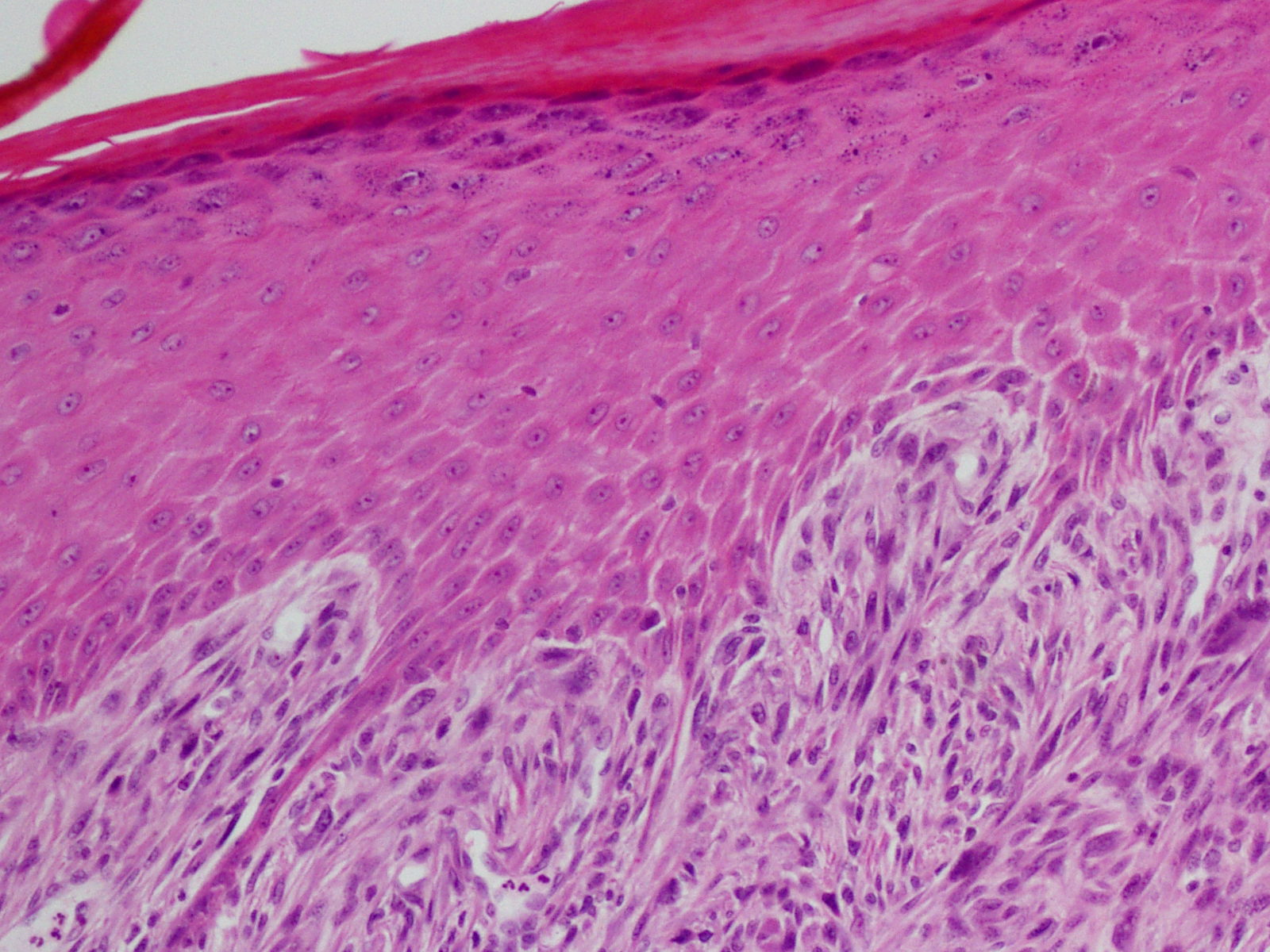
Spindle-cell squamous-cell carcinoma

== Prevention ==
Studies have found evidence for an association between diet and skin cancers, including SCC. The consumption of high-fat dairy foods increases SCC tumor risk in people with previous skin cancer. Green leafy vegetables may help prevent the development of subsequent SCC, and multiple studies found that raw vegetables and fruits are significantly protective against SCC risk. On the other hand, consumption of whole milk, yogurt, and cheese may increase SCC risk in susceptible people. In addition, a meat and fat dietary pattern can increase the risk of SCC in people without a history of SCC, but the association is again more prominent in people with a history of skin cancer. Tobacco smoking and a dietary pattern characterized by high beer and liquor intake also increase the risk of SCC significantly.
