= The Cancer Genome Atlas =

Project to catalogue genetic mutations responsible for cancer

The Cancer Genome Atlas (TCGA) is a project to catalogue the genomic alterations responsible for cancer using genome sequencing and bioinformatics. The overarching goal was to apply high-throughput genome analysis techniques to improve the ability to diagnose, treat, and prevent cancer through a better understanding of the genetic basis of the disease.

TCGA was supervised by the National Cancer Institute's Center for Cancer Genomics and the National Human Genome Research Institute funded by the US government. A three-year pilot project, begun in 2006, focused on characterization of three types of human cancers: glioblastoma multiforme, lung squamous carcinoma, and ovarian serous adenocarcinoma. In 2009, it expanded into phase II, which planned to complete the genomic characterization and sequence analysis of 20–25 different tumor types by 2014. Ultimately, TCGA surpassed that goal, characterizing 33 cancer types including 10 rare cancers.

The project initially set out to collect and characterize 500 patient samples, more than most genomics studies of its time, and used a variety of different molecular techniques. Techniques included gene expression profiling, copy number variation profiling, SNP genotyping, genome wide DNA methylation profiling, microRNA profiling, and exon sequencing. With restraints of nascent technology and costs at the start of the project, many array-based technologies and limited targeted gene sequencing were performed. During phase II, TCGA was able to begin performing whole exome sequencing and whole transcriptome sequencing on all cases, and whole genome sequencing on 10% of the cases used in the project.

== Goals ==
The goal of TCGA's pilot project was to establish an infrastructure to collect, molecularly characterize, and analyze 500 cancers and matched controls. The work required extensive cooperation among a team of scientists from various institutions and assessment of multiple burgeoning high-throughput technologies. TCGA wanted to not only generate high-quality and biologically meaningful genomic data, but also make that data freely available to the cancer research community.

Three tumor types were explored during the pilot phase, glioblastoma multiforme (GBM) and high-grade serous ovarian adenocarcinoma, and lung squamous carcinoma. Following success of the pilot phase, TCGA expanded its effort to characterize additional cancer types and provide a rich and large genomic data set for further cancer research discovery.

== Management ==
TCGA was co-managed by scientists and managers from the National Cancer Institute (NCI) and the National Human Genome Research Institute (NHGRI). With the expansion of TCGA from the pilot phase to Phase II in October 2009, NCI created a TCGA Program Office to help manage the project. Jean Claude Zenklusen has been the director of the office since August 2013.

The TCGA Program Office was responsible for the operation of six Genome Characterization Centers, seven Genome Analysis Centers, the Biospecimen Core Resource, the Data Coordination Center, and approximately one third of the sequencing done for the project by the three Genome Sequencing Centers. In addition, the TCGA Project Office was responsible for coordinating the accrual of tissues for TCGA. Carolyn Hutter, project manager for NHGRI, directed two thirds of the sequencing at the Genome Sequencing Centers.

Members from the NCI and the NHGRI teams, along with principal investigators funded by the project, comprised the Steering Committee. The Steering Committee was tasked with overseeing the scientific validity of the project while the NCI/NHGRI administrative team ensured that the scientific progress and goals of the project were met, the project was completed on time and on budget, and the various components of the project worked together.

== Tissue accrual ==
Tissue requirements varied from tissue type to tissue type and from cancer type to cancer type. Disease experts from the project's Disease Working Groups helped to define the characteristics of the typical tissue samples accrued as "standard of care" in the United States and how TCGA could best utilize the tissue. For example, the Brain Disease Working Group determined that samples containing more than 50% necrosis would not be suitable for TCGA and that 80% tumor nuclei were required in the viable portion of the tumor. TCGA followed some general guidelines as a starting point for collecting samples from any type of tumor, including a minimum of 200 mg in size, no less than 80% tumor nuclei and a matched source of germline DNA (such as blood or purified DNA). In addition, institutions submitting tissues to TCGA were required to include a minimal clinical data set as defined by the Disease Working Group, signed consents which have been approved by their institution's IRB, as well as a material transfer agreement with TCGA.

In 2009, NCI removed approximately $130 million of ARRA from the NCI's "Prime Contract" with Science Applications International Corporation (SAIC) to fund tissue accrual and a variety of other activities through the NCI Office of Acquisition. $42 million was available for tissue accrual through NCI using "Requests for Quotations" (RFQs) and "Requests for Proposals" (RFPs) to generate purchase orders and contracts, respectively. RFQs were primarily used for the collection of retrospective samples from established banks while RFPs were used for the prospective collection of samples. TCGA finalized sample collection in December, 2013, with nearly 20,000 biospecimens.

Institutions that contributed samples to TCGA were paid, and gained advance access to molecular data generated on their samples, while maintaining a link between the TCGA unique identifier and their own unique identifier. This permitted contributing institutions to link back to the clinical data for their samples and to enter into collaborations with other institutions that had similar data on TCGA samples, thus increasing the power of outcome analysis.

== Organization ==
TCGA managed a number of different types of centers that were funded to generate and analyze data. TCGA was the first large-scale genomics project funded by the NIH to include significant resources to bioinformatic discovery. The NCI has devoted 50% of TCGA appropriated funds, approximately $12M/year, to fund bioinformatic discovery. Genome Characterization Centers and Genome Sequencing Centers generated data. Two separate Genome Data Analysis Centers utilized the data for bioinformatic discovery. Two centers were funded to isolate biomolecules from patient samples and one center is funded to store the data. This workflow has evolved over the years and is now known as NCI's Genome Characterization Pipeline.

=== Biospecimen Core Resource ===
The Biospecimen Core Resource (BCR) was responsible for verifying the quality and quantity of tissue shipped by tissue source sites, isolating DNA and RNA from the samples, performing quality control of these biomolecules, and shipping processed samples to the GSCs and GCCs. The International Genomics Consortium was awarded the contract to initiate the BCR for the pilot project. There were two BCRs funded by NCI at the start of the full project: Nationwide Children's Hospital and the International Genomics Consortium. The BCRs were recompeted in 2010 and Nationwide Children's Hospital was awarded the contract.

=== Genome Sequencing Centers ===
Three Genome Sequencing Centers (GCCs) were co-funded by NCI and NHGRI: the Broad Institute, McDonnell Genome Institute at Washington University and Baylor College of Medicine. All three of these sequencing centers have shifted from Sanger sequencing to next-generation sequencing (NGS). A variety of NGS technologies were tested and implemented simultaneously.

=== Genome Characterization Centers ===
The NCI funded seven Genome characterization centers: the Broad Institute, Harvard, University of North Carolina, MD Anderson Cancer Center, Van Andel Institute, Baylor College of Medicine and the British Columbia Cancer Center.

=== Data Coordinating Center ===
The Data Coordinating Center (DCC) was the central repository for TCGA data. It was also responsible for the quality control of data entering the TCGA database. The DCC also maintained the TCGA Data Portal, which was where users could access processed TCGA data. This work was performed under contract by bioinformatics scientists and developers from SRA International, Inc. The DCC did not host raw sequencing data, however. NCI's Cancer Genomics Hub (CGHub) was the secure repository for storing, cataloging, and accessing sequence-related data. This work was performed by scientists and staff at the University of California, Santa Cruz Genomics Institute. Since 2017, all types of data were moved to NCI's Genomic Data Commons.

=== Genome Data Analysis Centers ===
Seven Genome Data Analysis Centers (GDACs) funded by the NCI/NHGRI were responsible for the integration of data across all characterization and sequencing centers as well as biological interpretation of TCGA data. The GDACs included The Broad Institute, University of North Carolina, Oregon Health and Science University, University of California, Santa Cruz, MD Anderson Cancer Center, Memorial Sloan Kettering Cancer Center, and The Institute for Systems Biology. All seven GDACs worked together to develop an integrated data analysis pipeline.

== Cancer Types Selected for Study ==
A preliminary list of tumors for TCGA to study was generated by compiling incidence and survival statistics from the SEER Cancer Statistic website. In addition, U.S. current “Standard of Care” was considered when choosing the top 25 tumor types, as TCGA was targeting tumor types where resection prior to adjunct therapy was the standard of care. Availability of samples also played a critical role in determining which tumor types to study and the order in which tumor projects are started; the more common the cancer type, the more likely that samples would be accrued quickly for study. This resulted in common tumor types, such as colon, lung and breast cancer becoming the first tumor types entered into the project, before rare tumor types.

Cancer types selected for study byTCGA included: lung squamous cell carcinoma, kidney papillary carcinoma, clear cell kidney carcinoma, breast ductal carcinoma, renal cell carcinoma, cervical cancer (squamous), colon adenocarcinoma, stomach adenocarcinoma, rectal carcinoma, hepatocellular carcinoma, Head and neck (oral) squamous cell carcinoma, thyroid carcinoma, bladder urothelial carcinoma – nonpapillary, uterine corpus (endometrial carcinoma), pancreatic ductal adenocarcinoma, acute myeloid leukemia, prostate adenocarcinoma, lung adenocarcinoma, cutaneous melanoma, breast lobular carcinoma and lower grade glioma, esophageal carcinoma, ovarian serous cystadenocarcinoma, lung squamous cell carcinoma, adrenocortical carcinoma, Diffuse Large B-cell lymphoma, paraganglioma & pheochromocytoma, cholangiocarcinoma, uterine carcinosarcoma, uveal melanoma, thymoma, sarcoma, mesothelioma, and testicular germ cell cancer.

TCGA began accruing samples for all of these tumor types simultaneously. The tumor types with the most samples accrued were entered into the characterization pipeline first. The rarer tumor types which were more difficult to accrue and tumor types for which TCGA could not identify a source of high-quality samples were entered into the TCGA production pipeline in the second year of the project. This gave the TCGA Program Office additional time to accrue sufficient samples for the project.

TCGA and the Mouse Organogenesis Cell Atlas (MOCA) were elaborated by machine learning and deep learning to compare and find correlation between cancer and embryonic cells in early cell development and differentiation. They were also applied to distinguish changes in gene expression patterns between various types of tumors from an unknown source.

== TCGA Publications ==
Progress as of October 15, 2018
| Cancer Type Studied | Final Number Analyzed in Original Marker Paper | TCGA Analysis Findings |
|---|---|---|
| Glioblastoma Multiforme | 206 | GBM subtypes Classical, Mesenchymal and Proneural are defined by EGFR, NF1, and PDGFRA/IDH1 mutations respectively; over 40% of tumors have mutations in chromatin-modifier genes; other frequently mutated genes include TP53, PlK3R1, PIK3CA, IDH1, PTEN, RB1, LZTR1 |
| Lower Grade Glioma | 293 | Defined three subtypes correlating with patient outcomes: IDH1 mutant with 1p/19q deletion, IDH mutant without 1p/19q deletion, and IDH wildtype; IDH wildtype is genomically similar to glioblastoma |
| Breast Lobular Carcinoma | 203 | Lobular carcinoma distinct from ductal carcinoma; FOXA1 elevated in lobular carcinoma, GATA3 elevated in ductal carcinoma; lobular carcinoma enriched for PTEN loss and Akt activation |
| Breast Ductal Carcinoma | 784 | Four distinct genomic subtypes: basal, Her2, luminal A, luminal B; most common driver mutations TP53, PIK3CA, GATA3; basal subtype similar to serous ovarian cancer |
| Colorectal Adenocarcinoma | 276 | Colon and rectal cancers have similar genomic profiles; hypermutated subtype (16% of samples) mostly found in right colon and associated with favorable prognosis; new potential drivers: ARlD1A, SOX9, FAM123B/WTX; overexpression of: ERBB2, IGF2; mutations in the WNT pathway |
| Stomach Adenocarcinoma | 295 | Identified four subtypes: EBV characterized by Epstein-Barr virus infection, MSI (microsatellite instability) characterized by hypermutation, GS characterized by genomic stability, CIN characterized by chromosomal instability; CIN enriched for mutations in tyrosine kinases |
| Esophageal Carcinoma | 164 | Squamous cell and adenocarcinoma are molecularly distinct; squamous cell carcinomas were similar to head and neck squamous cell carcinomas and had frequent amplifications of CCND1, SOX2 and TP63; adenocarcinomas were similar to chromosomally unstable gastric adenocarcinoma and had frequent amplifications in ERBB2, VEGFA, GATA4, and GATA6 |
| Ovarian Serous Cystadenocarcinoma | 489 | Mutations in TP53 occurred in 96% of the cases studied; mutations in BRCA1 and BRCA2 occurred in 21% of the cases and were associated with more favorable outcomes |
| Uterine Corpus Endometrial Carcinoma | 373 | Classified endometrial cancers into four categories: POLE ultramutated, MSI (microsatellite instability) hypermutated, copy-number low, and copy-number high; uterine serous carcinomas were similar to ovarian serous and basal-like Breast carcinomas and had less favorable prognoses than uterine endometrioid carcinomas |
| Cervical Squamous Cell Carcinoma and Adenocarcinoma | 228 | Identification of HPV-negative, endometrial-like cervical cancers with mutations in KRAS, ARID1A, and PTEN genes; amplification of CD274 and PDCD1LG2 immune checkpoint genes; alterations to genes including MED1, ERBB3, CASP8, HLA-A, and TGFBR2 and fusions involving lncRNA BCAR4; nearly three-quarters of samples had alterations in either one or both of the PI3K/MAPK and TGF-beta signaling pathways |
| Head and Neck Squamous Cell Carcinoma | 279 | Identified genomic features of HPV- and smoking-related cancers: HPV-positive characterized by shortened or deleted TRAF3, HPV-negative characterized by co-amplification of 11q13 and 11q22, smoking-related characterized by TP53 mutations, CDKN2A inactivation, and copy number alterations |
| Thyroid Carcinoma | 496 | Majority driven by RAS or BRAFV600E mutations; tumors driven by these mutations are distinct |
| Acute Myeloid Leukemia | 200 | Low mutation burden, with only 13 coding mutations on average per tumor; classified driver events into nine categories including transcription factor fusions, histone modifier mutations, spliceosome mutations and others |
| Cutaneous Melanoma | 331 | Established four subtypes: BRAF mutant, RAS mutant, NF1 mutant, and triple wild-type based on driver mutations; higher levels of immune lymphocyte infiltration correlated with better patient survival |
| Lung Adenocarcinoma | 230 | High mutation burden; 76% of tumors demonstrated activation of receptor tyrosine kinase pathways |
| Lung Squamous Cell Carcinoma | 178 | High average number of mutations and copy number aberrations; like ovarian serous cystadenocarcinoma, almost all lung squamous cell carcinomas contained a mutation in TP53; many tumors contained inactivating mutations in HLA-A that may help the cancer avoid immune detection |
| Clear Cell Renal Cell Carcinoma | 446 | Commonly mutated genes included VHL involved in oxygen sensing, SED2 involved in epigenetic modifications resulting in global hypomethylation, and genes of the PI3K/AKT/mTOR pathway; metabolic shift similar to the 'Warburg effect' correlates with a poor prognosis |
| Kidney Papillary Carcinoma | 161 | 81% of type 1 tumors contained an alteration to MET; genomic profiles of type 2 tumors were heterogeneous, with alterations to CDKN2A, SETD2, TFE3, or increased expression of the NRF2–ARE pathway; loss of expression of CDKN2A and CpG island methylation phenotype were associated with poor outcome |
| Invasive Urothelial Bladder Cancer | 131 | Smoking is associated with increased risk; frequently mutated genes include TP53, which was inactivated in 76% of tumors and ERBB2 (HER2), genes in the receptor tyrosine kinase (RTK)/RAS pathways altered in 44% of tumors; |
| Prostate Adenocarcinoma | 333 | Highly heterogeneous with 26% of samples driven by unknown molecular alterations; 7 subtypes defined by ETS transcription factor gene fusions or mutations in SPOP, FOXA1, or IDH1; actionable lesions in the PI3K, MAPK, and DNA repair pathways |
| Chromophobe Renal Cell Carcinoma | 66 | Extremely low mutation burden; the carcinoma originates from more distal regions of the kidney compared to clear cell carcinoma, which is primarily from proximal regions; metabolic shift distinct from the 'Warburg effect' shift observed in clear cell carcinoma; TP53 and PTEN tumor suppressor genes were frequently mutated; TERT gene promoter was frequently altered |
| Adrenocortical Carcinoma | 91 | Overexpression of IGF2, mutations in TP53, PRKAR1A and other genes, and copy number alterations were common hallmarks; hypoploidy followed by whole genome doubling may be a driving mechanism of tumor development |
| Paraganglioma & Pheochromocytoma | 173 | Four distinct subtypes: Wnt-altered, cortical admixture, pseudohypoxia and kinase signaling; MAML3 fusion gene and CSDE1 somatic mutation define and drive the poor prognosis, Wnt-altered subtype |
| Cholangiocarcinoma | 38 | Low expression of CDKN2, BAP1, and ARID1 genes and overexpression of FGFR2 and IDH1/2 genes; four subtypes, one subtype characterized by alterations in IDH, silencing of ARID1A and low expression of other chromatin modifiers, and high mitochondrial gene expression; another subtype characterized by BAP1 mutations and FGFR2 gene fusions; the cancer may exist on a continuous spectrum with a subset of liver carcinomas with IDH or FGFR mutations |
| Liver Hepatocellular Carcinoma | 363 | TERT promoter mutations, identified in 44% of tumors, associated with increased elongation of telomeres and silencing of CDKN2A; TP53 commonly mutated or under-expressed; CTNNBB1 significantly mutated; many tumors with high levels of lymphocyte infiltration or overexpressed immune checkpoint genes CTLA4, PD-1, and PD-L1 |
| Pancreatic Ductal Adenocarcinoma | 150 | Used deep and targeted sequencing to better analyze low neoplastic cellularity; KRAS mutations present in 93% of tumors; mutations in RREB1 or other members of RAS-MAPK signaling pathway |
| Uterine Carcinosarcoma | 57 | Identified a strong and varied degree of epithelial-mesenchymal transition; TP53 mutations present in 91% of samples; alterations in PI3K present in half of samples |
| Uveal Melanoma | 80 | Complex mutations in BAP1; identified distinct subdivisions of disomy 3 (D3) and monosomy 3 (M3) subtypes; in M3, mutually exclusive EIF1AX and SRSF2/SF3B1 mutations have distinct methylation profiles and prognoses |
| Thymoma | 117 | Four major molecular subtypes found that correspond to known hisopathological subtypes B, TC, AB, and a mix of A and AB; low mutational burden; enrichment of HRAS, NRAS, TP53, and recurrent GTF2I mutations were observed; expression of autoimmune targets and aneuploidy links thymoma to myasthenia gravis. |
| Sarcoma | 206 | TP53, ATRX, and RB1 among the few genes recurrently mutated across sarcoma types; copy number alterations frequently occurred in complex karyotype sarcomas, affecting p53 and RB1 cell cycle and other pathways; synovial sarcoma sarcomas expressed fusions in SSX1 or SSX2 and TERT; For dedifferentiated liposarcoma, JUN amplification associates with worse survival; altered PI3K-AKT-mTOR pathway in leiomyosarcoma; undifferentiated pleomorphic sarcoma and myxofibrosarcoma may be driven by alterations in the Hippo pathway |
| Mesothelioma | 74 | Identified a novel genomic subtype accounting for about 3% of samples with: TP53 and SETDB1 mutations and loss of one copy of nearly all chromosomes (which researchers termed Genomic "near haploidization"); alterations to BAP1 were present in over half of cases studied and may affect transcription factor activity and immune signaling; immune checkpoint gene VISTA was strongly expressed in epithelioid mesothelioma. |
| Testicular Germ Cell Cancer | 137 | The major histological subtypes of the disease (seminoma, embryonal carcinoma, yolk sac, teratoma) had distinct molecular patterns; all histology types exhibited extensive aneuploidy and low mutation frequency but distinct patterns of DNA methylation and miRNA expression; a subset of pure seminomas are defined by KIT mutations, distinct DNA methylation and immune infiltration profiles, and decreased KRAS copy number. significant somatic mutations are present only in tumors with seminoma components. |

=== Glioblastoma multiforme ===
In 2008, the TCGA published its first results on glioblastoma multiforme (GBM) in Nature. These first results characterized and analyzed 91 tumor-normal matched pairs. While 587 biospecimens were collected for the study, most were rejected during quality control: the tumor samples needed to contain at least 80% tumor nuclei and no more than 50% necrosis, and a secondary pathology assessment had to agree that the original diagnosis of GBM was accurate. A last batch of samples was excluded because the DNA or RNA collected was not of sufficient quality or quantity to be analyzed by all of the different platforms used in the study.

All of the data from this study, as well as data that has been collected since the publication were made publicly available at TCGA's Data Coordinating Center (DCC) for public access (later moved toe the Genomic Data Commons). Most of the processed TCGA data is completely open access. For data that could potentially identify specific patients, users apply for controlled-data access to the Data Access Committee (DAC), which evaluates whether the end user is a bona fide researcher and is asking a legitimate scientific question that merits access to individual-level data. Data access credentials are now managed through NIH's dbGAP.

Since the publication of the first marker paper, several analysis groups within the TCGA Network have presented more detailed analyses of the glioblastoma data. An analysis group led by Roel Verhaak, PhD, Katherine A. Hoadley, PhD, and D. Neil Hayes, MD, successfully correlated glioma gene expression subtypes with genomic abnormalities. The DNA methylation data analysis team, led by Houtan Noushmehr, PhD and Peter Laird, PhD, identified a distinct subset of glioma samples which displays concerted hypermethylation at a large number of loci, indicating the existence of a glioma-CpG island methylator phenotype (G-CIMP). G-CIMP tumors belong to the proneural subgroup and were tightly associated with IDH1 somatic mutations.

=== Serous ovarian adenocarcinoma ===
TCGA reported on mRNA expression, microRNA expression, promoter methylation, DNA copy number, and exome sequencing of 316 tumor samples of high grade serous ovarian cancer in Nature in June 2011. The researchers found mutations of the gene TP53 in an overwhelming 96% of the cases analyzed, Recurrent mutations at lower frequency were found in a handful of other genes, including NF1, BRCA1, BRCA2, RB1 and CDK12.

TCGA researchers were also able to identify gene expression patterns that correlated with patient survival. They defined four subtypes of the cancer according to gene expression and DNA methylation patterns: immunoreactive, differentiated, proliferative, and mesenchymal. They also identified 68 genes as potential drug targets.

=== Colorectal carcinoma ===
TCGA reported on the exome sequence, DNA copy number, promoter methylation and messenger RNA characterization of 276 tumor samples of colon and rectal cancers in Nature in July 2012. 97 of the samples also underwent ultra-low coverage whole genome sequencing.

TCGA researchers discovered the same type of alterations in colon and rectal tumors, indicating that they are a single type of cancer. Some differences, such as hypermethylation, were apparent in tumors originating in the right colon. A subset of the tumors were found to be hypermutated; a majority of those also had high microsatellite instability. Two dozen significantly mutated genes and recurring copy number alterations were found. The study suggested new markers for aggressive colorectal carcinoma and an important role for MYC-directed transcriptional activation and repression.

=== Phase II: Expanding TCGA to 33 Cancer Types ===
Fueled by the American Recovery and Reinvestment Act of 2009, NIH extended TCGA to cover 20 types of cancer. This included an effort to study rare cancers, which was enabled with support from patients, patient advocacy groups, and doctors. Starting in 2011, TCGA began holding Annual Scientific Symposiums to discuss and share novel biological discoveries on cancer, analytical methods and translational approaches using the data.

In December 2013, TCGA concluded sample collection, having shipped and processed over 20,000 specimens. By the project’s completion, TCGA published “marker papers” describing the characterization and basic analyses covering 33 cancer types. For several cancer types, such as bladder urothelial carcinoma and GBM, additional cases were collected and a second analysis was performed.

=== Pan-Cancer Atlas Analyses ===
In 2013, TCGA published an initial Pan-Cancer analysis describing the "mutational landscape" defined as frequently recurring mutations identified from exome sequencing of 3,281 tumours from 12 commonly occurring cancer subtypes. The twelve subtypes studied were breast adenocarcinoma, lung adenocarcinoma, lung squamous cell carcinoma, endometrial carcinoma, glioblastoma multiforme, squamous cell carcinoma of the head and neck, colon cancer, rectal cancer, bladder cancer, kidney clear cell carcinoma, ovarian carcinoma and acute myeloid leukaemia.

In 2018, the TCGA Research Network published what is collectively known as the Pan-Cancer Atlas: a collection of 35 papers summarizing the work accomplished by TCGA and describing overarching themes of cancer biology elucidated by analyzing all of TCGA data as a whole.

The main topics are (1) cell-of-origin patterns, which groups and analyzes tumors based on biological system or histological subtype; (2) oncogenic processes, which considers the complex downstream impacts alterations may have on molecular pathways and the microenvironment, and (3) signaling pathways, which surveys the role different pathways play in different cancers and their potential vulnerabilities.

The completion of the Pan-Cancer Atlas marked the official end of TCGA as a program, though the data, analysis methods, and other resources produced by TCGA continues to serve as a resource for researchers. For example, TCGA’s whole-genome data were analyzed as part of the Pan-Cancer Analysis of Whole Genomes (PCAWG), an international effort to analyze 2,600 cancer whole genomes to understand somatic and germline variations in both coding and non-coding regions.

| Theme | Publication |
|---|---|
| Cell-of-Origin Patterns | Cell-of-Origin Patterns Dominate the Molecular Classification of 10,000 Tumors from 33 Types of Cancer (summary paper) |
| | Machine Learning Identifies Stemness Features Associated with Oncogenic Dedifferentiation |
| | A Comprehensive Pan-Cancer Molecular Study of Gynecologic and Breast Cancers |
| | Comparative Molecular Analysis of Gastrointestinal Adenocarcinomas |
| | Genomic, Pathway Network, and Immunologic Features Distinguishing Squamous Carcinomas |
| | The Cancer Genome Atlas Comprehensive Molecular Characterization of Renal Cell Carcinoma |
| Oncogenic Processes | Perspective on Oncogenic Processes at the End of the Beginning of Cancer Genomics (summary paper) |
| | Pathogenic Germline Variants in 10,389 Adult Cancers |
| | Comprehensive Characterization of Cancer Driver Genes and Mutations |
| | Driver Fusions and Their Implications in the Development and Treatment of Human Cancers |
| | The Immune Landscape of Cancer |
| | Spatial Organization and Molecular Correlation of Tumor-Infiltrating Lymphocytes Using Deep Learning on Pathology Images |
| | Genomic and Functional Approaches to Understanding Cancer Aneuploidy |
| | A Pan-Cancer Analysis of Enhancer Expression in Nearly 9,000 Patient Samples |
| | lncRNA Epigenetic Landscape Analysis Identifies EPIC1 as an Oncogenic lncRNA that Interacts with MYC and Promotes Cell-Cycle Progression in Cancer |
| | Pan-Cancer Analysis of lncRNA Regulation Supports Their Targeting of Cancer Genes in Each Tumor Context |
| | Systematic Analysis of Splice-Site-Creating Mutations in Cancer |
| | Scalable Open Science Approach for Mutation Calling of Tumor Exomes Using Multiple Genomic Pipelines |
| | An Integrated TCGA Pan-Cancer Clinical Data Resource to Drive High-Quality Survival Outcome Analytics |
| | Comprehensive Analysis of Alternative Splicing Across Tumors from 8,705 Patients |
| Signaling Pathways | Oncogenic Signaling Pathways in The Cancer Genome Atlas (summary paper) |
| | Pan-cancer Alterations of the MYC Oncogene and Its Proximal Network across the Cancer Genome Atlas |
| | Machine Learning Detects Pan-cancer Ras Pathway Activation in The Cancer Genome Atlas |
| | Genomic and Molecular Landscape of DNA Damage Repair Deficiency across The Cancer Genome Atlas |
| | Molecular Characterization and Clinical Relevance of Metabolic Expression Subtypes in Human Cancers |
| | Integrated Genomic Analysis of the Ubiquitin Pathway across Cancer Types |
| | Somatic Mutational Landscape of Splicing Factor Genes and Their Functional Consequences across 33 Cancer Types |
| | A Pan-Cancer Analysis Reveals High-Frequency Genetic Alterations in Mediators of Signaling by the TGF-β Superfamily |
| | Comprehensive Molecular Characterization of the Hippo Signaling Pathway in Cancer |

=== Analysis of Non-coding Regions ===
TCGA researchers also set out to systematically study the non-coding regions of the genome of multiple cancers. The team applied the assay for transposase-accessible chromatin using sequencing (ATAC-seq) to 410 TCGA tumor samples covering 23 primary cancers in order to gain insights into gene dysregulation in cancer. ATAC-seq is a low-cost method for identifying regions of open or active chromatin and positions of DNA-binding proteins.

Through ATAC-seq, researchers were able to identify a tens of thousands of potential DNA regulatory elements specific to different cancers and cell types. This provided insights into how gene dysregulation could help drive cancer initiation and progression. Understanding chromatin accessibility of known immune cell-specific regulatory elements also provided clues into the immune microenvironment and the availability of immunotherapy targets. The study, “The chromatin landscape of primary human cancers,” was published in 2018 in Science.

== See also ==
- Cancer Genome Project at the Wellcome Trust Sanger Institute
- International Cancer Genome Consortium
- List of biological databases
