= Liza Makowski Hayes =

American nutritional biochemist

- Born: Florida, US
- Spouse: D. Neil Hayes

Academic background
- Education: BS, Biology, 1994, Boston College; MSc, Medical Sciences, 1998, Harvard Medical School; PhD, Nutritional Biochemistry, 2003, Harvard T.H. Chan School of Public Health; Duke University
- Thesis: The role of fatty acid binding protein aP2 in atherosclerosis and macrophage biology (2003)

Academic work
- Institutions: University of Tennessee Health Science Center; University of North Carolina at Chapel Hill; Geron Corporation
- Website: makowskilab.lab.uthsc.edu

Liza Makowski Hayes is an American nutritional biochemist. As a professor at the University of Tennessee Health Science Center, her research focuses on how metabolic stress and inflammation alters the progression of diseases, specifically obesity and cancer.

== Early life and education ==
Makowski Hayes was born and raised in Florida before leaving to earn her Bachelor of Science degree in biology from Boston College. Upon graduation, she moved to California and worked for Geron Corporation, where she focused on stem cells and cancer research. During her second year with the company, Makowski Hayes returned home to assist with her ill mother before enrolling at Harvard Medical School and Harvard T.H. Chan School of Public Health. Following receiving her medical degree, Makowski Hayes served a post-doctoral fellowship at Duke University's Sarah W. Stedman Center for Nutrition and Metabolism.

== Career ==
Upon finishing her post-doctoral fellowship, Makowski Hayes joined the faculty in the Division of Biochemistry at the University of North Carolina at Chapel Hill (UNC) and established her lab in The Michael Hooker Research Center. The Makowski Lab studies metabolism and inflammation of white blood cells called macrophages and how that relates to obesity and cancer.

Beyond cancer research, Makowski Hayes and her research laboratory also began studying the American obesity epidemic. In 2007, Makowski Hayes and Melissa Troester became co-principal investigators on a National Institute of Environmental Health Sciences Breast Cancer and Environment Research Program study focused on how factors such as pregnancy and obesity may promote susceptibility of breast cancer that is more prevalent in young, African American patients. In 2011, she showed that feeding the rats a Western pattern diet, consisting of highly palatable, energy-dense foods, caused severe weight gain, tissue inflammation and diabetes. She also demonstrated that sugar intake could play an important role in the promotion of obesity-related insulin resistance and found a correlation between weight loss and a reducing in the progression of basal-like breast cancer. In order to find this correlation, her research team tracked changes in mammary gland tissue which were drivers of basal-like breast cancer.

Makowski Hayes continued to work alongside Troester during her tenure at UNC and co-launched the myBCrisk website to help women learn about their risk for breast cancer. The website specifically focused on the increased risk of cancer amongst black women and included a tool for assessing personal risk factors and videos of young Black cancer survivors. The project was funded by the National Institute of Environmental Health Sciences with support from the National Cancer Institute and the Avon Foundation. She also accepted an assistant professor position at the University of Tennessee Health Science Center where she received funding from the American Heart Association Beginning Grant-in-Aid for her project "The Role of Macrophage Substrate Metabolism in Atherosclerosis."

During the COVID-19 pandemic in North America, Makowski Hayes and Joseph F. Pierre received a $2.1 million, five-year grant from the National Cancer Institute to examine how the microbiome impacts the immune system and response to immunotherapy for triple negative breast cancer. Her research was also supported by a $100,000 grant from The Mary Kay Foundation.

== Personal life ==
Makowski Hayes is married to oncologist and physician-scientist D. Neil Hayes, with whom she shares three children.
