= Basaloid squamous cell lung carcinoma =

- Specialty: Oncology

Basaloid squamous cell carcinoma (Bas-SqCC) is an uncommon histological variant of lung cancer composed of cells exhibiting cytological and tissue architectural features of both squamous cell lung carcinoma and basal cell carcinoma.

== Classification ==
Lung cancer is a large and exceptionally heterogeneous family of malignancies. Over 50 different histological variants of lung cancer are explicitly recognized within the fourth (2004) revision of the World Health Organization Classification of Lung Tumours ("WHO-2004"). Many of these entities are quite rare, have only been recently described, and remain poorly understood.

Basaloid forms of lung carcinoma were first described in the peer-reviewed medical literature by Dr. Elisabeth Brambilla and her colleagues in 1992.

In the third revision of the World Health Organization lung tumor typing and classification scheme, published in 1999, basaloid variants of both squamous cell lung carcinoma (SqCC) and large cell lung carcinoma (LCLC) were recognized as distinct entities. In the fourth revision (2004) of the WHO system (currently the world standard) Bas-SqCC is classified as one of four recognized variants of squamous cell lung carcinoma. As a variant of SqCC, it is considered a non-small cell lung cancer (NSCLC).

== Pathogenesis ==
Both basaloid and squamous cell carcinomas have been shown to arise from pre-malignant lesions of dysplasia in the airways of the lung.

== Diagnosis ==
Like other forms of lung cancer, Bas-SqCC is ultimately diagnosed after a pathologist examines a tumor sample containing viable malignant cells and tissue under a light microscope and identifies certain particular characteristics.

In the case of Bas-SqCC, it is essential that both evidence of squamous differentiation (i.e., intercellular bridges, production of keratin, tonofilament bundles) and basaloid architecture (i.e. prominent peripheral palisading of cell nuclei, organoid/lobular structures) are identified to make a correct diagnosis.

Immunohistochemical markers that have been suggested to be useful in making an accurate diagnosis of Bas-SqCC include positivity for p63 and high molecular weight keratin (i.e. 34betaE12), and lack of expression of thyroid transcription factor-1 (TTF-1).

Among other pulmonary malignancies, the main differential diagnoses in suspected cases of Bas-SqCC include the high-grade neuroendocrine carcinomas, such as small cell carcinoma and large cell neuroendocrine carcinoma. The issue of differential diagnosis is particularly acute when the pathologist must use a small biopsy specimen or cytology. In addition, the basaloid variant of SqCC can be difficult to distinguish from other poorly differentiated squamous cell carcinomas.

== Treatment ==
For last several decades of the 20th century, all histological variants of NSCLC were generally treated identically. In the last decade, it has become apparent that different variants of malignant tumors generally exhibit diverse genetic, biological, and clinical properties, including response to treatment.

As patients with uncommon lung tumor variants, including tumors composed of mixtures of histological subtypes, tend to be excluded from clinical trials, the most efficacious treatment regimen(s) for basaloid squamous cell carcinoma remain unknown. In general, these variants appear to be treated according to standard protocols in place for squamous cell carcinoma.

== Prognosis ==
Like nearly all other forms of NSCLC, the prognosis of basaloid squamous cell carcinoma is quite poor.

Although case numbers tend to be rather small, and the published studies statistically underpowered, much (but not all) evidence suggests that basaloid squamous cell lung carcinomas may have a somewhat worse prognosis than "conventional" (i.e. non-basaloid) squamous cell lung carcinomas. As survival has been noted to be worse in basaloid variants at earlier tumor stages (i.e. Stages I and II), the decreased survival could be attributable to earlier distant metastasis appearing during the natural history of these tumors, as compared to other squamous cell carcinomas and NSCLCs in general.

== Epidemiology ==
The true incidence and prevalence of basaloid squamous cell lung carcinoma remains unknown, but this form of lung cancer is considered relatively uncommon. In one of the largest studies of this particular variant, Moro-Sibilot and co-workers found a 6.3% prevalence of Bas-SqCC among 1,418 consecutive NSCLC patients at their institution.

Basaloid carcinomas of the lung - like nearly all recognized variants of lung cancer - are highly associated with tobacco smoking. Basaloid architecture in pulmonary carcinomas has been shown to be particularly prevalent in smokers with heavy exposure, and squamous cell carcinoma has the strongest association with tobacco exposure than any other major cell type of NSCLC.

As compared to other forms of lung cancer, Bas-SqCC often occurs in those who are somewhat older than average.

Basaloid squamous cell carcinoma usually begins centrally, in the larger proximal bronchi. Basaloid carcinoma primary in the lung may also occur in a multicentric form.
