= Evanescent (dermatology) =

Form of skin lesion

Evanescent skin lesions, like wheals, are those that last for less than 24 hours before resolving.

== See also ==
- Skin lesion
