= Skin condition =

Any medical condition that affects the integumentary system

- Other names: Cutaneous condition
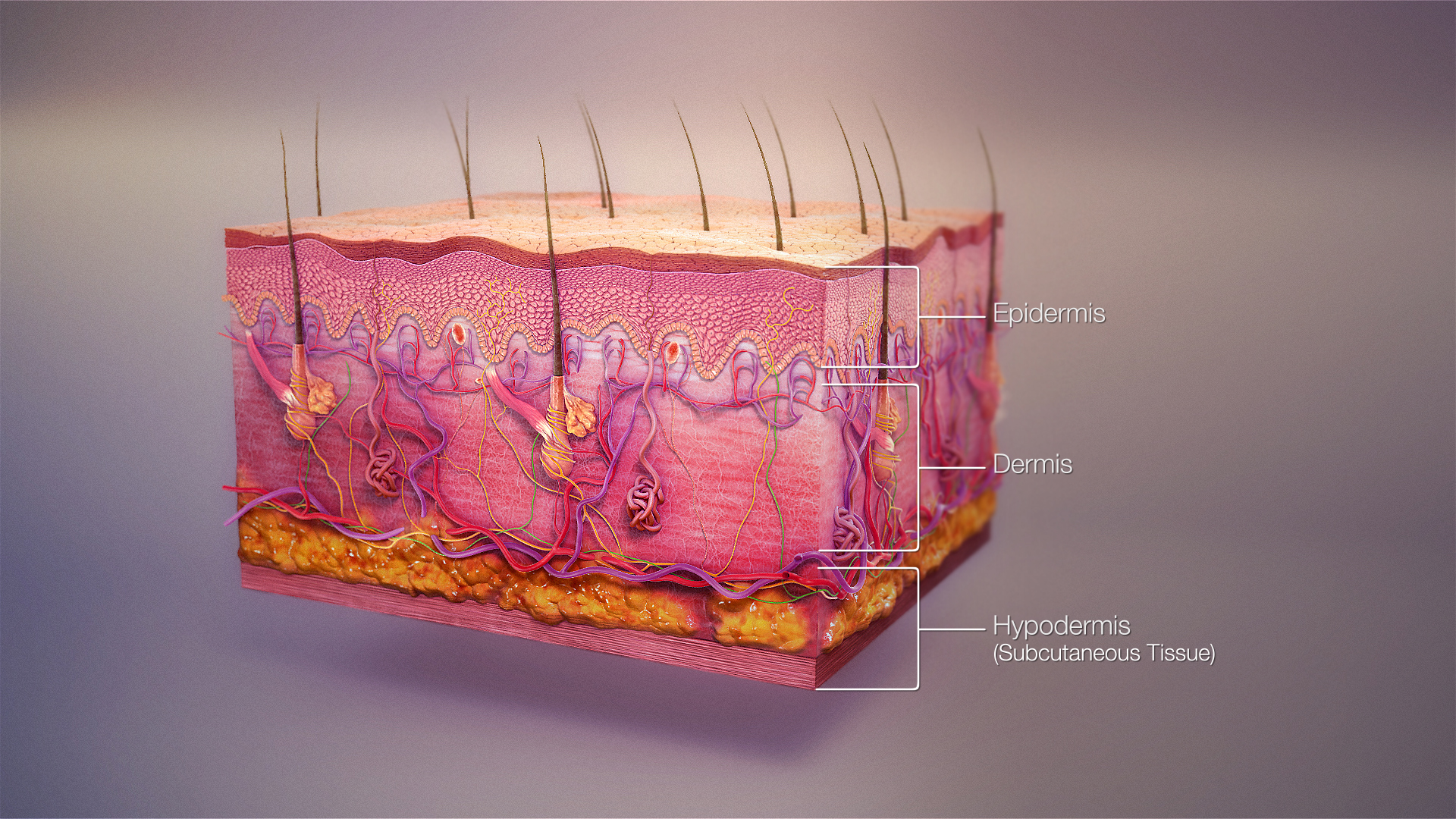
- 3D medical illustration showing major layers of skin
- Specialty: Dermatology
- Causes: Bacteria, viruses, fungi, parasites, insects, trauma, cancers, allergies, toxins, vitamin/nutritional deficiencies/excesses, prolonged pressure, impaired blood circulation, ingrown hairs or nails, autoimmune conditions, aging, sun exposure, radiation exposure, exposure to heat/cold, dryness, humidity, other organ damage or condition, substance usage or contact, hereditary conditions, etc.

A skin condition, also known as a cutaneous condition, is any medical condition that affects the integumentary system—the organ system that encloses the body and includes skin, nails, and related muscle and glands. The major function of this system is to act as a barrier against the external environment.

Conditions of the human integumentary system constitute a broad spectrum of diseases, also known as dermatoses, as well as many nonpathologic states (like, in certain circumstances, melanonychia and racquet nails). While only a small number of skin diseases account for most visits to the physician, thousands of skin conditions have been described. Classification of these conditions often presents many nosological challenges, since underlying causes and pathogenetics are often not known. Therefore, most current textbooks present a classification based on location (for example, conditions of the mucous membrane), morphology (chronic blistering conditions), cause (skin conditions resulting from physical factors), and so on.

Clinically, the diagnosis of any particular skin condition begins by gathering pertinent information of the presenting skin lesion(s), including: location (e.g. arms, head, legs); symptoms (pruritus, pain); duration (acute or chronic); arrangement (solitary, generalized, annular, linear); morphology (macules, papules, vesicles); and color (red, yellow, etc.). Some diagnoses may also require a skin biopsy, which yields histologic information that can be correlated with the clinical presentation and any laboratory data. The introduction of cutaneous ultrasound has allowed the detection of cutaneous tumors, inflammatory processes, and skin diseases.

== Layer of skin involved ==
The skin weighs an average of 4 kg (8.8 lb), covers an area of about 2 m^{2} (22 sq ft), and is made of three distinct layers: the epidermis, dermis, and subcutaneous tissue. The two main types of human skin are glabrous skin, the nonhairy skin on the palms and soles (also referred to as the "palmoplantar" surfaces), and hair-bearing skin. Within the latter type, hairs in structures called pilosebaceous units have a hair follicle, sebaceous gland, and associated arrector pili muscle. In the embryo, the epidermis, hair, and glands are from the ectoderm, which is chemically influenced by the underlying mesoderm that forms the dermis and subcutaneous tissues.

=== Epidermis ===
The epidermis is the most superficial layer of skin, a squamous epithelium with several strata: the stratum corneum, stratum lucidum, stratum granulosum, stratum spinosum, and stratum basale. Nourishment is provided to these layers via diffusion from the dermis, since the epidermis is without a direct blood supply. The epidermis contains four cell types: keratinocytes, melanocytes, Langerhans cells, and Merkel cells. Of these, keratinocytes are the major component, constituting roughly 95% of the epidermis. This stratified squamous epithelium is maintained by cell division within the stratum basale, in which differentiating cells slowly displace outwards through the stratum spinosum to the stratum corneum, where cells are continually shed from the surface. In normal skin, the rate of production equals the rate of loss; about two weeks are needed for a cell to migrate from the basal cell layer to the top of the granular cell layer, and an additional two weeks to cross the stratum corneum.

=== Dermis ===
The dermis is the layer of skin between the epidermis and subcutaneous tissue, and comprises two sections, the papillary dermis and the reticular dermis. The superficial papillary dermis interdigitates with the overlying rete ridges of the epidermis, between which the two layers interact through the basement membrane zone. Structural components of the dermis are collagen, elastic fibers, and ground substance also called extra fibrillar matrix. Within these components are the pilosebaceous units, arrector pili muscles, and the eccrine and apocrine glands. The dermis contains two vascular networks that run parallel to the skin surface—one superficial and one deep plexus—which are connected by vertical communicating vessels. The function of blood vessels within the dermis is fourfold: to supply nutrition, to regulate temperature, to modulate inflammation, and to participate in wound healing.

=== Subcutaneous tissue ===
The subcutaneous tissue is a layer of fat between the dermis and underlying fascia. This tissue may be further divided into two components, the actual fatty layer, or panniculus adiposus, and a deeper vestigial layer of muscle, the panniculus carnosus. The main cellular component of this tissue is the adipocyte, or fat cell. The structure of this tissue is composed of septal (i.e. linear strands) and lobular compartments, which differ in microscopic appearance. Functionally, the subcutaneous fat insulates the body, absorbs trauma, and serves as a reserve energy source.

== Diseases of the skin ==
Diseases of the skin include skin infections and skin neoplasms (including skin cancer).

== History ==
In 1572, Geronimo Mercuriali of Forlì, Italy, completed De morbis cutaneis ('On the diseases of the skin'). It is considered the first scientific work dedicated to dermatology.

== Diagnoses ==
The physical examination of the skin and its appendages, as well as the mucous membranes, forms the cornerstone of an accurate diagnosis of cutaneous conditions. Most of these conditions present with cutaneous surface changes termed "lesions," which have more or less distinct characteristics. Often proper examination will lead the physician to obtain appropriate historical information and/or laboratory tests that are able to confirm the diagnosis. Upon examination, the important clinical observations are the (1) morphology, (2) configuration, and (3) distribution of the lesion(s). With regard to morphology, the initial lesion that characterizes a condition is known as the "primary lesion", and identification of such a lesions is the most important aspect of the cutaneous examination. Over time, these primary lesions may continue to develop or be modified by regression or trauma, producing "secondary lesions". However, with that being stated, the lack of standardization of basic dermatologic terminology has been one of the principal barriers to successful communication among physicians in describing cutaneous findings. Nevertheless, there are some commonly accepted terms used to describe the macroscopic morphology, configuration, and distribution of skin lesions, which are listed below.

== Lesions ==
=== Primary lesions ===
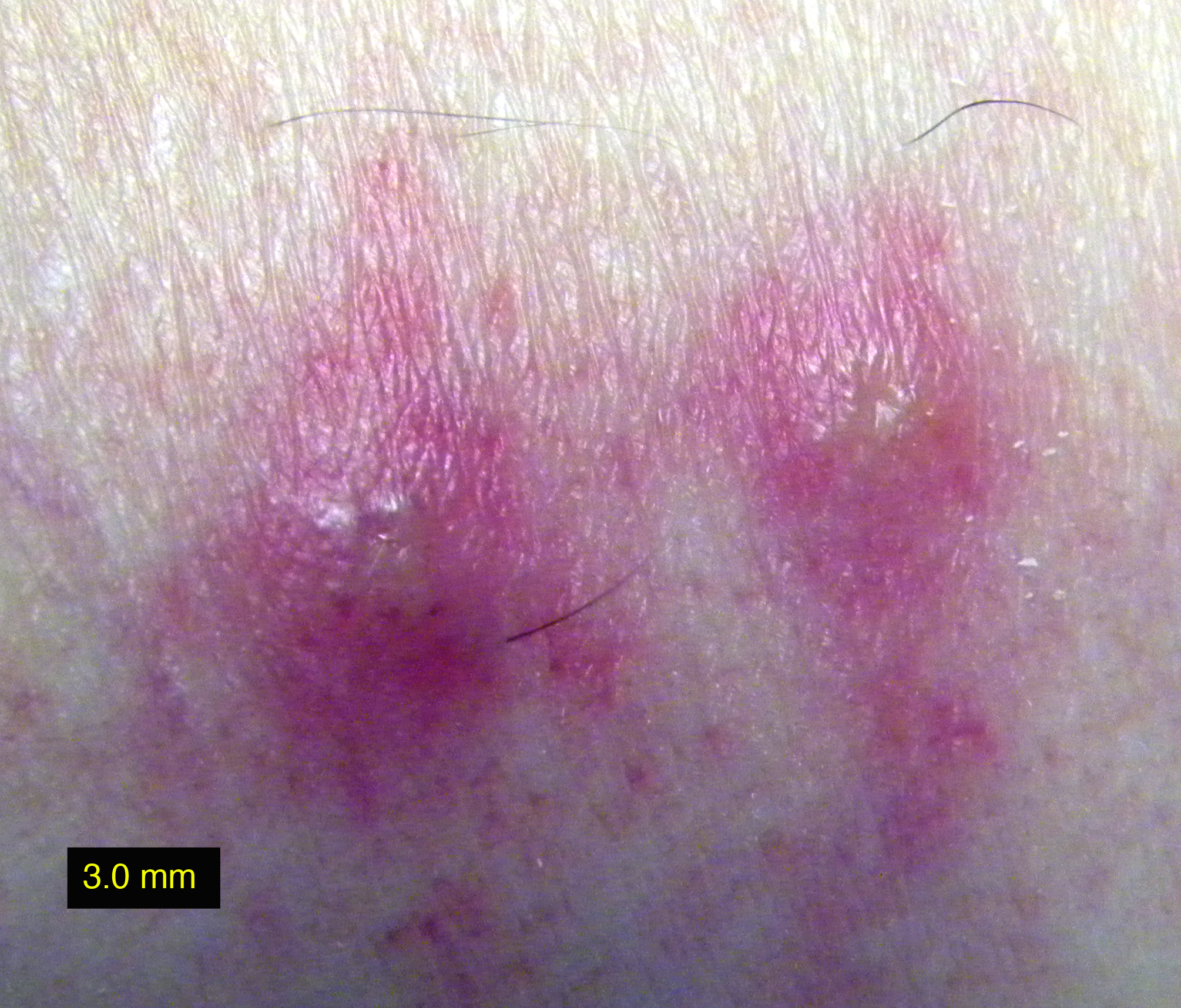
Chigger bites on human skin showing characteristic welts

Macule and patch

Papule and plaque

Nodules

Vesicles and bulla

Fissures, erosions and ulcers

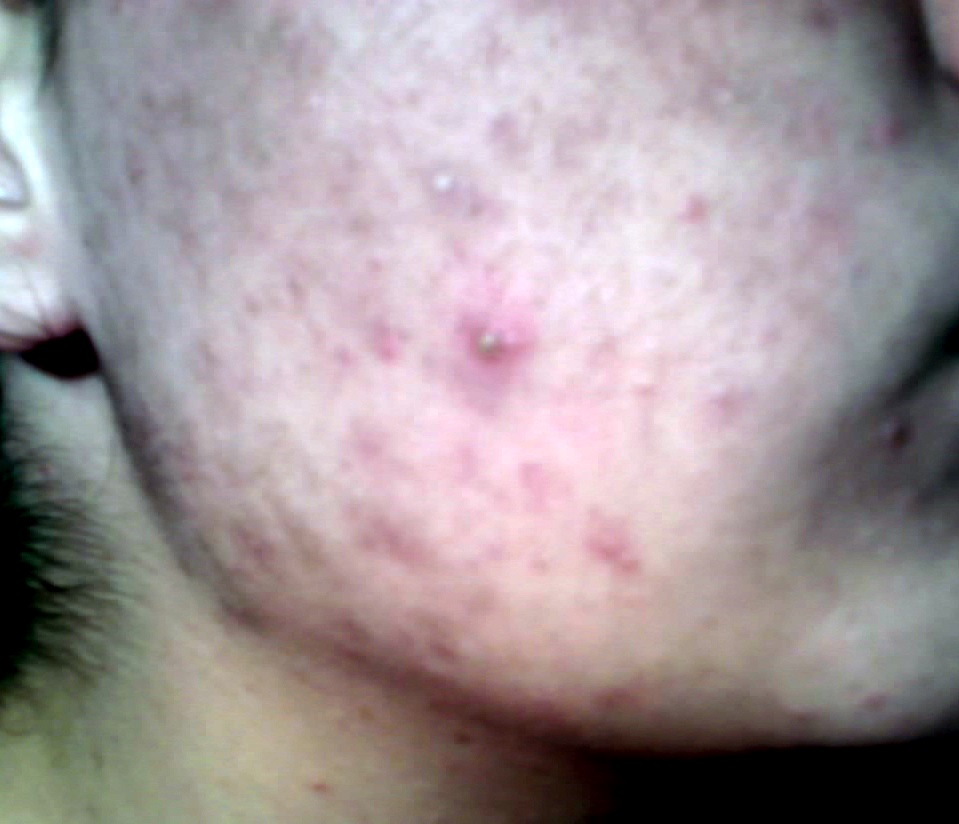
A pustule on the cheek

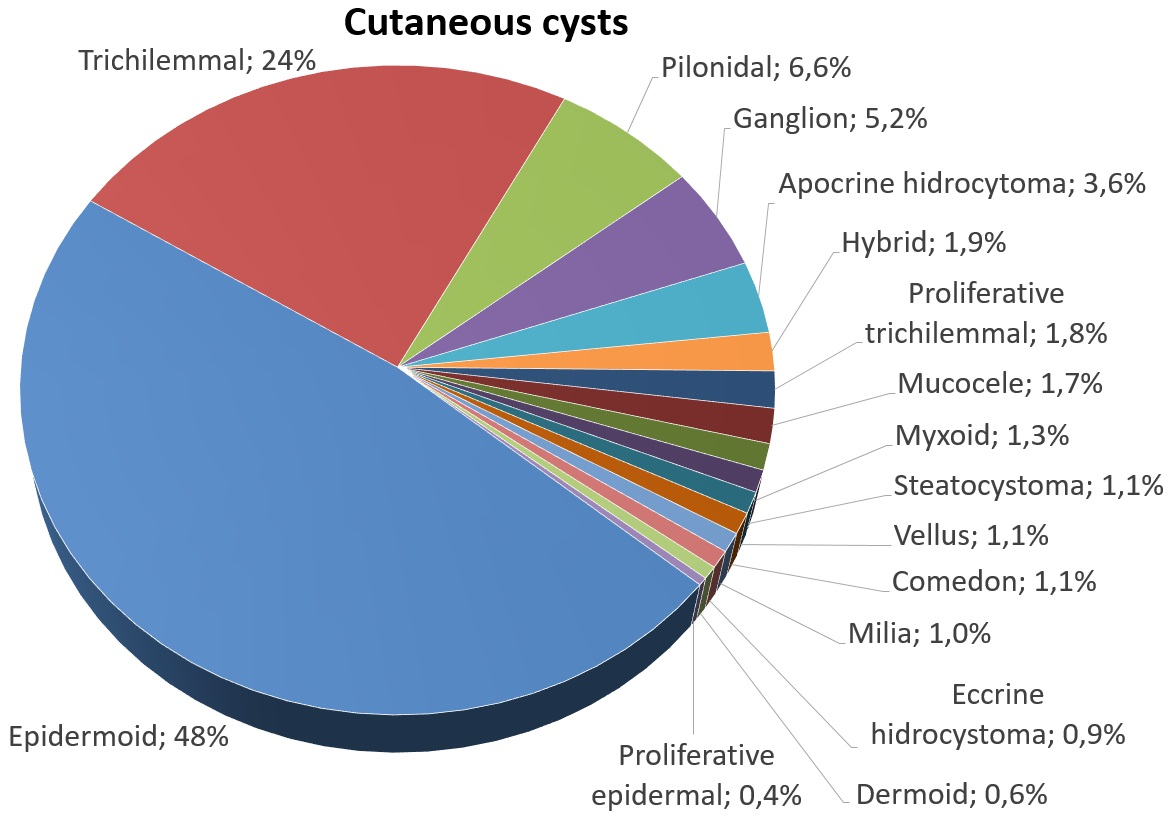
Relative incidence of skin cysts

Pustule

- Macule: A macule is a change in surface color, without elevation or depression, so nonpalpable, well or ill-defined, variously sized, but generally considered less than either 5 or 10 mm in diameter at the widest point.
- Patch: A patch is a large macule equal to or greater than either 5 or 10 mm across, depending on one's definition of a macule. Patches may have some subtle surface change, such as a fine scale or wrinkling, but although the consistency of the surface is changed, the lesion itself is not palpable.
- Papule: A papule is a circumscribed, solid elevation of skin, varying in size from less than 5 mm up to 10 mm in diameter at the widest point.
- Plaque: A plaque has been described as a broad papule, or confluence of papules equal to or greater than 10 mm, or alternatively as an elevated, plateau-like lesion that is greater in its diameter than in its depth.
- Nodule: A nodule is morphologically similar to a papule in that it is also a palpable spherical lesion less than 10 mm in diameter. However, it is differentiated by being centered deeper in the dermis or subcutis.
- Tumor: Similar to a nodule, but it is larger than 10 mm in diameter.
- Vesicle: A vesicle or bleb is a small blister, a circumscribed, epidermal elevation generally considered less than either 5 or 10 mm in diameter at the widest point.
- Bulla: A bulla is a large blister, a rounded or irregularly shaped blister equal to or greater than either 5 or 10 mm, depending on one's definition of a vesicle.

- Pustule: A pustule is a small elevation of the skin usually consisting of necrotic inflammatory cells. Pustulation is the formation, breaking out of, or state of having pustules and is sometimes synonymous with pustule.
- Cyst: A cyst is an epithelial-lined cavity.
- Wheal: A wheal is a rounded or flat-topped, pale red papule or plaque that is characteristically evanescent, disappearing within 24 to 48 hours. The temporarily raised skin on the site of a properly delivered intradermal (ID) injection is also called a wheal, with the ID injection process itself frequently referred to as simply "raising a wheal" in medical texts.
- Welts: Welts occur as a result of blunt force being applied to the body with elongated objects without sharp edges.
- Telangiectasia: A telangiectasia represents an enlargement of superficial blood vessels to the point of being visible.
- Burrow: A burrow appears as a slightly elevated, grayish, tortuous line in the skin, and is caused by burrowing organisms.

=== Secondary lesions ===
- Scale: Dry or greasy laminated masses of keratin, they represent thickened stratum corneum.
- Crust: Dried sebum usually mixed with epithelial and sometimes bacterial debris
- Lichenification: Epidermal thickening characterized by visible and palpable thickening of the skin with accentuated skin markings
- Erosion: An erosion is a discontinuity of the skin exhibiting incomplete loss of the epidermis, a lesion that is moist, circumscribed, and usually depressed.
- Excoriation: A punctate or linear abrasion produced by mechanical means (often scratching), usually involving only the epidermis, but commonly reaching the papillary dermis.
- Ulcer: An ulcer is a discontinuity of the skin exhibiting complete loss of the epidermis and often portions of the dermis.
- Fissure is a lesion in the skin that is usually narrow but deep.
- Induration is dermal thickening causing the cutaneous surface to feel thicker and firmer.
- Atrophy refers to a loss of skin, and can be epidermal, dermal, or subcutaneous. With epidermal atrophy, the skin appears thin, translucent, and wrinkled. Dermal or subcutaneous atrophy is represented by depression of the skin.
- Maceration: softening and turning white of the skin due to being consistently wet.
- Umbilication is the formation of a depression at the top of a papule, vesicle, or pustule.
- Phyma: A tubercle on any external part of the body, such as in phymatous rosacea

=== Configuration ===
"Configuration" refers to how lesions are locally grouped ("organized"), which contrasts with how they are distributed (see next section).

- Agminate: in clusters
- Annular or circinate: ring-shaped
- Arciform or arcuate: arc-shaped
- Digitate: with finger-like projections
- Discoid or nummular: round or disc-shaped
- Figurate: with a particular shape
- Guttate: resembling drops
- Gyrate: coiled or spiral-shaped
- Herpetiform: resembling herpes
- Linear
- Mammillated: with rounded, breast-like projections
- Reticular or reticulated: resembling a net
- Serpiginous: with a wavy border
- Stellate: star-shaped
- Targetoid: resembling a bullseye
- Verrucous or Verruciform: wart-like

=== Distribution ===
"Distribution" refers to how lesions are localized. They may be confined to a single area (a patch) or may be in several places. Some distributions correlate with the means by which a given area becomes affected. For example, contact dermatitis correlates with locations where an allergen has elicited an allergic immune response. Varicella zoster virus is known to recur (after its initial presentation as chicken pox) as herpes zoster ("shingles"). Chicken pox appears nearly everywhere on the body, but herpes zoster tends to follow one or two dermatomes; for example, the eruptions may appear along the bra line, on either or both sides of the patient.

- Generalized
- Symmetric: one side mirrors the other
- Flexural: on the front of the fingers
- Extensor: on the back of the fingers
- Intertriginous: in an area where two skin areas may touch or rub together
- Morbilliform: resembling measles
- Palmoplantar: on the palm of the hand or bottom of the foot
- Periorificial: around an orifice such as the mouth
- Periungual/subungual: around or under a fingernail or toenail
- Blaschkoid: following the path of Blaschko's lines in the skin
- Photodistributed: in places where sunlight reaches
- Zosteriform or dermatomal: associated with a particular nerve

=== Other related terms ===
- Collarette
- Comedo
- Confluent
- Eczema (a type of dermatitis)
- Evanescent (lasting less than 24 hours)
- Granuloma
- Livedo
- Purpura
- Erythema (redness)
- Horn (a cell type)
- Poikiloderma

== Histopathology ==
- Hyperkeratosis
- Parakeratosis
- Hypergranulosis
- Acanthosis
- Papillomatosis
- Dyskeratosis
- Acantholysis
- Spongiosis
- Hydropic swelling
- Exocytosis
- Vacuolization
- Erosion
- Ulceration
- Lentiginous

== See also ==
- Wound, an injury which damages the epidermis.
