= Exocytosis (dermatopathology) =

Infiltration of skin by blood cells

Exocytosis is infiltration of the epidermis by inflammatory or circulating blood cells.

== See also ==
- Skin lesion
- Skin disease
- List of skin diseases
