= Hydropic swell =

Intracellular edema of keratinocytes

Hydropic swelling is intracellular edema of keratinocytes, often seen with viral infections.

== See also ==
- Skin lesion
- Skin disease
- List of skin diseases
