= Tonofibril =

Protein cytoskeletal component

Tonofibrils are cytoplasmic protein structures in epithelial tissues that converge at desmosomes and hemidesmosomes. They consist of bundles of keratin intermediate filaments (tonofilaments) in epithelial cells that are anchored to the cytoskeleton. They were discovered by Rudolf Heidenhain, and first described in detail by Louis-Antoine Ranvier in 1897.

== Composition ==
Tonofilaments are keratin intermediate filaments that make up tonofibrils in the epithelial tissue. They may also just be referred to as keratin intermediate filaments. In epithelial cells, tonofilaments loop through desmosomes. Electron microscopy has advanced now to illustrate the tonofilaments more clearly.

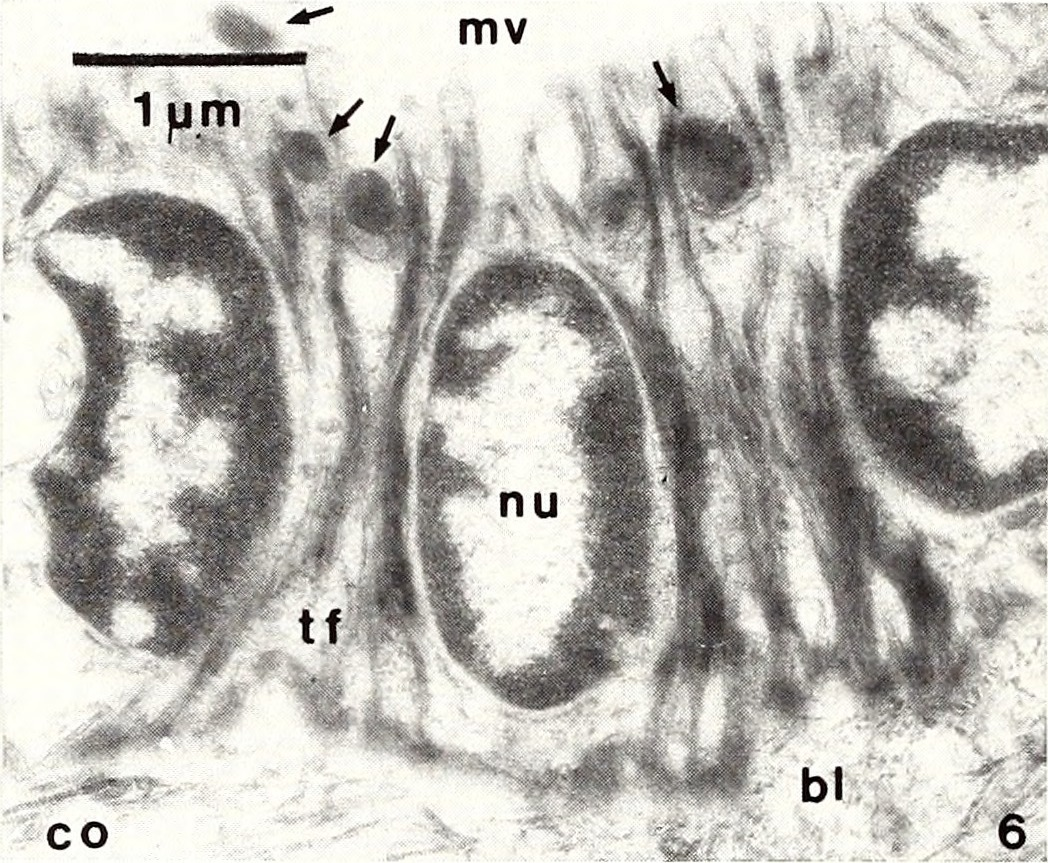
Transmission electron micrograph depicting tonofilaments, labeled tf, running longitudinally within the dorsal epidermal cells of the girdle of a chiton

The protein filaggrin is believed to be synthesized as a giant precursor protein, profilaggrin (>400 kDA in humans). When filaggrin binds to keratin intermediate filaments, the keratin aggregates into macrofibrils.
