= Carey K. Anders =

American cancer researcher

Carey K. Anders FASCO

Academic background
- Education: East Carolina University; Duke University School of Medicine

Academic work
- Discipline: medicine
- Sub-discipline: oncology
- Institutions: Duke University Health System; UNC Lineberger Comprehensive Cancer Center; University of North Carolina at Chapel Hill
- Main interests: brain metastasis

External videos
- “Breakthrough Women in Science & Medicine: Dr. Carey Anders”, PBS.

Carey K. Anders is an American cancer researcher, professor of medicine and medical oncologist. She serves as director for the Duke Center for Brain and Spine Metastasis (DCBSM) in the School of Medicine at Duke University Health System.

Anders studies the genetic sequencing, prognosis and treatment of brain metastasis and its relationship to primary forms of cancer, in particular breast cancer. Patients with brain metastasis have traditionally been excluded from clinical trials. Anders' work has led to the development of novel therapies for those with brain metastases, including triple negative and HER2-positive breast cancer.

Anders is a Fellow of the American Society of Clinical Oncology and an inaugural co-recipient of the Weatherspoon Family Brain Tumor Research Award. In 2021, her work was recognized by the American Society of Clinical Oncology as an important advance in clinical progress against cancer.

== Early life and education ==
Carey Kernodle Anders is a daughter of Harold B. Kernodle, Jr., an orthopedic surgeon, and Lucy Hendrick Kernodle, a registered nurse. The couple lived in Graham, North Carolina, and worked in Burlington, North Carolina.

Kernodle received her M.D. from the Brody School of Medicine at East Carolina University in 2002. She then held an Internal Medicine Residency at the Duke University School of Medicine from 2002 to 2005, followed by a Hematololgy-Oncology Fellowship from 2005 to 2008.

== Career ==
In 2008 Anders joined the School of Medicine of the University of North Carolina at Chapel Hill, where she worked with the UNC Lineberger Comprehensive Cancer Center. In 2012, Anders helped to found the UNC Brain Metastases Specialty Clinic, becoming a co-director. She has served as medical director of the UNC Breast Center and as an associate professor at UNC's School of Medicine in the Division of Hematology/Oncology.

In January 2019, Anders returned to the School of Medicine at Duke University Health System as a Translating Duke Health Scholar, a professor of medicine, and the Medical Director for the Duke Center for Brain and Spine Metastasis (DCBSM). In addition to being Medical Director, Anders served as Chief of the Division of Medical Oncology from 2021 to 2025. In 2025, Anders was promoted from Co-Director of DCBSM to became the Director of DCBSM.

== Research ==
External videos
- Carey K. Anders, MD, Duke Health Provider Profiles
- SABCS 2024: Brain Metastasis, San Antonio Breast Cancer Symposium, April 14, 2025

Anders studies the prognosis and treatment of brain metastasis from breast cancer. She sequences genes from banked brain tumors to better understand the genetics of metastases related to different primary cancers. She examines the effectiveness of treatments for patients with brain metastasis, a population that has been traditionally excluded from clinical trials. Anders' work has led to the development of novel therapies for those with brain metastases.

== Awards and honors ==
- 2011, Weatherspoon Family Brain Tumor Research Award
- 2011, Breast Cancer Research Foundation-AACR Grant for Translational Breast Cancer Research
- 2012, Clinical Investigator Award, Damon Runyon Cancer Research Foundation.
- 2016, Advanced Clinical Research Award (ACRA) in Breast Cancer, Conquer Cancer Foundation
- 2018-2019, Leadership Development Program, American Society of Clinical Oncology
- 2021, Clinical Cancer Advances, American Society of Clinical Oncology
- 2021, Women in Leadership Nominee, Women Leaders in Oncology
- 2023, Fellow, American Society of Clinical Oncology
- 2024, Chair's Commitment to Excellence Award, Duke University

== Selected publications ==
- Anders, CK; Hsu, DS; Broadwater, G; Acharya, CR; Foekens, JA; Zhang, Y; Wang, Y; Marcom, PK; Marks, JR; Febbo, PG; Nevins, JR; Potti, A; Blackwell, KL (10 July 2008). "Young age at diagnosis correlates with worse prognosis and defines a subset of breast cancers with shared patterns of gene expression". Journal of Clinical Oncology. 26 (20): 3324–30. doi:10.1200/JCO.2007.14.2471. PMID 18612148.
- Anders, CK; Johnson, R; Litton, J; Phillips, M; Bleyer, A (June 2009). "Breast cancer before age 40 years". Seminars in Oncology. 36 (3): 237–49. doi:10.1053/j.seminoncol.2009.03.001. PMC 2894028. PMID 19460581.
- Anders, CK; Carey, LA (June 2009). "Biology, metastatic patterns, and treatment of patients with triple-negative breast cancer". Clinical Breast Cancer. 9 Suppl 2 (Suppl 2): S73-81. doi:10.3816/CBC.2009.s.008. PMC 2919761. PMID 19596646.
- Achrol, AS; Rennert, RC; Anders, C; Soffietti, R; Ahluwalia, MS; Nayak, L; Peters, S; Arvold, ND; Harsh, GR; Steeg, PS; Chang, SD (17 January 2019). "Brain metastases". Nature Reviews. Disease Primers. 5 (1): 5. doi:10.1038/s41572-018-0055-y. PMID 30655533.
- Murthy, RK; Loi, S; Okines, A; Paplomata, E; Hamilton, E; Hurvitz, SA; Lin, NU; Borges, V; Abramson, V; Anders, C; Bedard, PL; Oliveira, M; Jakobsen, E; Bachelot, T; Shachar, SS; Müller, V; Braga, S; Duhoux, FP; Greil, R; Cameron, D; Carey, LA; Curigliano, G; Gelmon, K; Hortobagyi, G; Krop, I; Loibl, S; Pegram, M; Slamon, D; Palanca-Wessels, MC; Walker, L; Feng, W; Winer, EP (13 February 2020). "Tucatinib, Trastuzumab, and Capecitabine for HER2-Positive Metastatic Breast Cancer". The New England Journal of Medicine. 382 (7): 597–609. doi:10.1056/NEJMoa1914609. hdl:20.500.11820/a1ba8d8f-77ae-4378-a1e1-e45533d2ee47. PMID 31825569.
- Ramakrishna, Naren; Anders, Carey K.; Lin, Nancy U.; Morikawa, Aki; Temin, Sarah; Chandarlapaty, Sarat; Crews, Jennie R.; Davidson, Nancy E.; Franzoi, Maria Alice B.; Kirshner, Jeffrey J.; Krop, Ian E.; Patt, Debra A.; Perlmutter, Jane; Giordano, Sharon H. (10 August 2022). "Management of Advanced Human Epidermal Growth Factor Receptor 2–Positive Breast Cancer and Brain Metastases: ASCO Guideline Update". Journal of Clinical Oncology. 40 (23): 2636–2655. doi:10.1200/JCO.22.00520. ISSN 0732-183X. PMID 35640075.
- Zimmer, AS; Van Swearingen, AED; Anders, CK (April 2022). "HER2-positive breast cancer brain metastasis: A new and exciting landscape". Cancer Reports. 5 (4) e1274. doi:10.1002/cnr2.1274. PMC 9124511. PMID 32881421.
- Kaufman, PA; Neuberger, E; Schwartz, NRM; Wang, S; Liu, Y; Hsu, LI; Bartley, K; Blahna, MT; Pittner, BT; Wong, G; Anders, C (2023). "Real-world patient characteristics, treatment patterns, and clinical outcomes associated with tucatinib therapy in HER2-positive metastatic breast cancer". Frontiers in Oncology. 13 1264861. doi:10.3389/fonc.2023.1264861. PMC 10578436. PMID 37849811.
