= D. Neil Hayes =

American oncologist

- Born: Atlanta, Georgia, US
- Spouse: Liza Makowski Hayes

Academic background
- Education: BS, Chemistry, 1991, Davidson College; MD, 1996, University of North Carolina at Chapel Hill; MPH, Epidemiology, 1997, Harvard T.H. Chan School of Public Health; MS, Clinical Care Research, 2006, Tufts Medical Center

Academic work
- Institutions: University of Tennessee Health Science Center; UNC School of Medicine; Boston University

David "Neil" Hayes is an American oncologist and physician–scientist. He is the Van Vleet Endowed Professor in Medical Oncology and the division chief of haematology and oncology at the University of Tennessee Health Science Center. As a result of his research, Hayes was elected a Member of the American Society for Clinical Investigation.

== Early life and education ==
Hayes was born in Atlanta, Georgia, but his family moved to Winston-Salem, North Carolina at the age of five where he subsequently grew up. He was born to mother Nancy W. Hayes and grew up alongside sister Allison O. Hayes.

Hayes earned his Bachelor of Science degree in his hometown at Davidson College before enrolling at the University of North Carolina at Chapel Hill for his medical degree. From there, Hayes earned his Master's degree in public health in epidemiology from Harvard T.H. Chan School of Public Health and completed a three-year residency at the Boston University School of Medicine (BU) where he began to focus on cancer research. Hayes remained in the state for his master's in clinical care research degree and then worked as a post-doctoral fellow at Dana-Farber Cancer Institute.

== Career ==
Upon completing his education, Hayes accepted an assistant professorship position at the UNC School of Medicine in 2004. In this role, he co-developed a screening tool administered to adolescents seeking emergency care which could also predicted whether they carry a firearm. Hayes later earned a two-year $100,000 grant from Joan's Legacy to study molecular subtypes of non-small cell lung cancer. He also became the co-director of a collaborative effort by the National Cancer Institute and the National Human Genome Research Institute to systematically characterize the genomic changes that occur in cancer. In 2010, Hayes led a study documenting four molecular subtypes of squamous cell cancer for the first time. They found evidence that tumors arise from different cells within the lung, suggesting a different biological origin among patients currently treated as a single group. In 2013, Hayes was appointed co-leader of UNC Lineberger Clinical Research Program with Elizabeth Claire Dees. As a result of his research, Hayes was elected a Member of the American Society for Clinical Investigation.

Hayes was recruited to join the University of Tennessee Health Science Center in 2017 as the scientific director of the UTHSC Center for Cancer Research and the Van Vleet Endowed Professor in Medical Oncology in the Department of Medicine. Hayes played a major role in developing The Cancer Genome Atlas (TCGA), a collaborative effort with the National Institutes of Health and the National Human Genome Research Institute to understand cancer at its molecular level by using genome sequencing and extensive data analysis. In recognition of his efforts, Hayes was recognized as a 2019 Health Care Hero in the Health Care Innovations category by the Memphis Business Journal. During the COVID-19 pandemic in North America, Hayes was the co-recipient of the 2020 Team Science Awards from the American Association for Cancer Research for his contributions to developing The Cancer Genome Atlas.

== Personal life ==
Hayes is married to nutritional biochemist Liza Makowski Hayes.
