= Earbuds =

Earbuds may refer to:

- Cotton swab, a small wad of cotton wrapped around one or both ends of a short plastic rod
- Earphones
