= Georgios Papanikolaou =

Greek pathologist (1883–1962)

- Γεώργιος Παπανικολάου
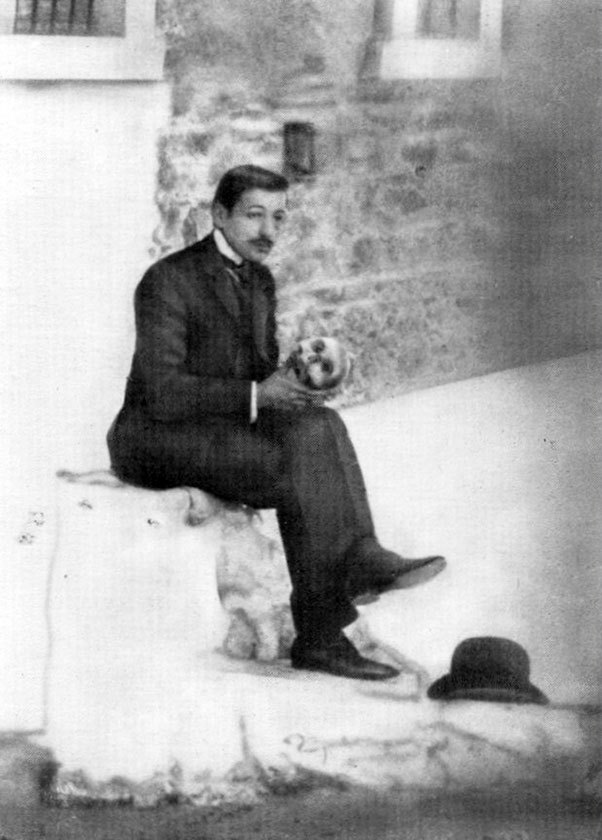
- Born: 13 May 1883; Kymi, Euboea, Greece
- Died: 19 February 1962 (aged 78); Miami, Florida, U.S.
- Education: University of Athens; Ludwig-Maximilians-Universität München
- Known for: Cytopathology; Pap smear
- Spouse: Andromachi Mavrogeni (m. 1910)
- Awards: Lasker-DeBakey Clinical Medical Research Award (1950)
- Scientific career
- Fields: Zoology, Pathology, Biology, Microscopy
- Workplaces: Cornell University; New York Hospital

Georgios Nikolaou Papanikolaou (or George Papanicolaou /ˌpæpəˈnɪkəlaʊ/; Greek: Γεώργιος Ν. Παπανικολάου [papanikoˈlau]; 13 May 1883 – 19 February 1962) was a Greek physician, zoologist and microscopist who was a pioneer in cytopathology and early cancer detection, and inventor of the pap smear for detection of cervical cancer.

After studying medicine in Greece and Germany, in 1913 he emigrated to the United States and was on the faculty at Cornell Medical College. He first reported that uterine cancer cells could be detected in vaginal smears in 1928, but his work was not widely recognized until the 1940s. An extensive trial of his techniques was carried out in the early 1950s. In 1961 he was invited to the University of Miami to lead and develop there the Papanicolaou Cancer Research Institute.

== Early life and education ==
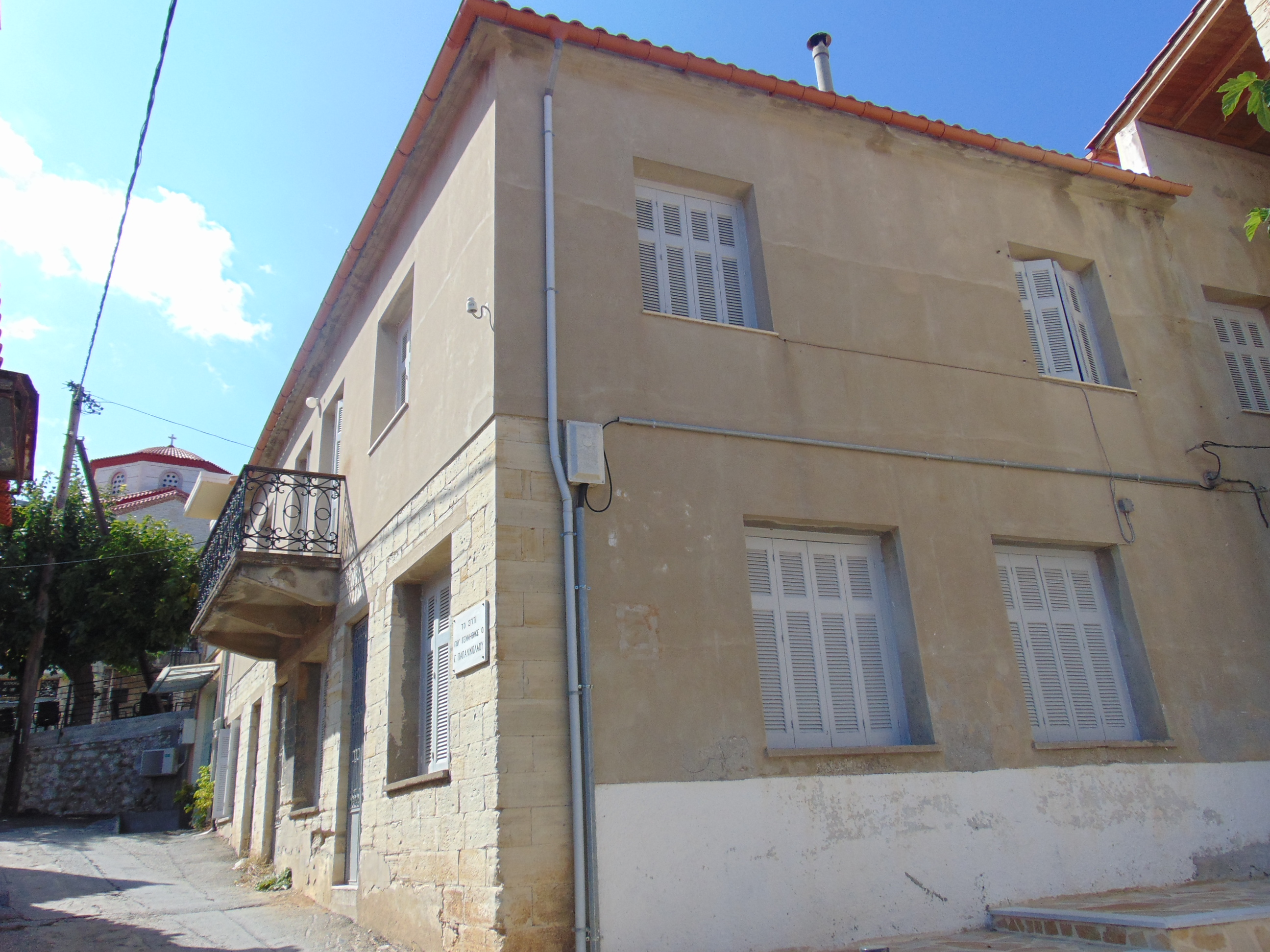
Papanikolaou's house in Kymi, Greece

Papanikolaou was born in Kymi, Greece, on 13 May 1883. He attended the University of Athens, where he studied literature, philosophy, languages and music. Urged by his physician father, he pursued a medical degree, which he received in 1904. He was then conscripted into military service. When his military obligation ended in 1906, he returned to Kymi to practice medicine with his father.

In 1907, he began studying in Germany under Ernst Haeckel at the University of Jena for one semester before moving to the University of Freiburg, where he was supervised by August Weismann. He then attended the Ludwig-Maximilians-Universität München, where in 1910 he received a PhD degree in zoology.

== Career ==
Papanikolaou then returned to Athens, where he married Andromachi Mavrogeni, who would later become his laboratory assistant and research subject. He next departed for Monaco, where he worked for the Oceanographic Institute of Monaco and participated in the Oceanographic Exploration Team of Prince Albert I of Monaco in 1911.

=== Cornell University ===
Two years later, in 1913, along with his wife, he immigrated to New York City in order to work in the pathology department at New York Hospital and the Department of Anatomy at Cornell University's Medical College.

Papanikolaou was also inspired by the philosophy of Immanuel Kant and Friedrich Nietzsche, Arthur Schopenhauer and Johann Wolfgang von Goethe, writing papers on philosophical matters for an Athenian literary quarterly. Nietzsche's philosophical thought was particularly crucial in shaping his character.

The importance of his work was recognized in 1942 with publication, along with Herbert F. Traut (1894–1963), of Diagnosis of Uterine Cancer by the Vaginal Smear. The book discusses the preparation of vaginal and cervical smears, physiologic cytologic changes during the menstrual cycle, the effects of various pathological conditions, and the changes seen in the presence of cancer of the cervix and of the endometrium of the uterus. He thus became known for his invention of the Papanicolaou test, commonly known as the Pap smear or Pap test, which is used worldwide for the detection and prevention of cervical cancer and other cytologic diseases of the female reproductive system.

=== University of Miami ===
In 1961, he moved to Miami, Florida, to develop the Papanicolaou Cancer Research Institute at the University of Miami, but died there on 19 February 1962 due to a myocardial infarction. His wife Andromachi Papanikolaou, known as Mary, continued his work at the Papanicolaou Cancer Research Institute after his death; she died in Miami on 13 October 1982.

== Discoveries ==
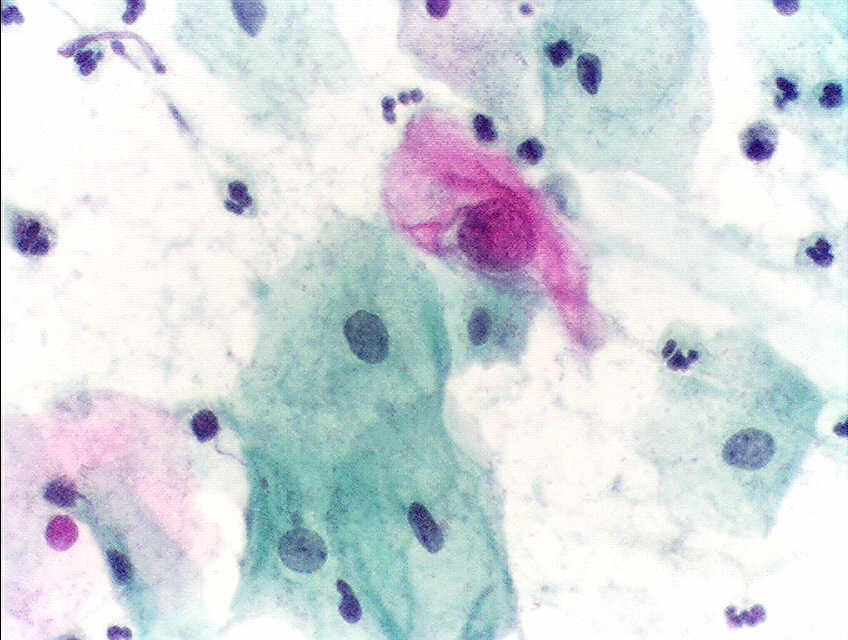
An abnormal pap test

In 1914, Papanikolaou and his wife worked at the Department of Anatomy at the Cornell Medical College of Cornell University and contributed to the histological and physiological changes associated with the oestrus cycle in the guinea pig. In 1917, Papanikolaou along with Charles R. Stockard demonstrated that, in the guinea pig, the histologic cyclic changes that occur in the reproductive tract during the estrus cycle also occur in the vaginal mucosa and can be detected by cytologic examination of vaginal smears. This technique (termed the Papanicolaou technique) was groundbreaking and also facilitated the discovery of an ovarian hormone.

Papanikolaou then began examining the human reproductive system. His wife Mary, was a crucial partner in this research. She was working in the same laboratory as an unpaid laboratory technician. Every day Mary provided a vaginal sample for the research. She also prepared her own samples in the laboratory for further analysis. She provided daily samples for twenty-one years, eventually encouraging her friends to also provide samples for the research.

In 1920, Georgios Papanikolaou realized that he could tell the difference between normal and malignant cells on the cervix by viewing smears on a slide under a microscope. In 1925, with funds from the National Research Council and the Maternal Health Committee, Papanikolaou recruited 12 hospital staff volunteers, together with a number of pregnant gynecological and surgical patients, for a systematic study of cervical cell morphology. The participants were regularly tested to determine normal hormonal changes and to diagnose early pregnancy. Upon examination of a slide made from a smear of one of the participant's vaginal fluid, Papanikolaou discovered that abnormal cancer cells could be plainly observed under a microscope. "The first observation of cancer cells in the smear of the uterine cervix," he later wrote, "gave me one of the greatest thrills I ever experienced during my scientific career."

In 1928, Papanikolaou told an incredulous audience of physicians about the noninvasive technique of gathering cellular debris from the lining of the vaginal tract and smearing it on a glass slide for microscopic examination as a way to identify cervical cancer. That year, he had undertaken a study of vaginal fluid in women, in hopes of observing cellular changes over the course of a menstrual cycle. In female guinea pigs, Papanicolaou had already noticed cell transformation and wanted to corroborate the phenomenon in human females. It happened that one of Papanikolaou's human subjects was suffering from uterine cancer.

At a 1928 medical conference in Battle Creek, Michigan, Papanikolaou introduced his low-cost, easily performed screening test for early detection of cancerous and precancerous cells. However, this potential medical breakthrough was initially met with skepticism and resistance from the medical community. Papanicolaou's next communication on the subject did not appear until 1941 when, with gynecologist Herbert Traut, he published a paper on the diagnostic value of vaginal smears in carcinoma of the uterus. This was followed two years later by an illustrated monograph based on a study of over 3,000 cases. In 1954, he published another memorable work, the Atlas of Exfoliative Cytology, thus creating the foundation of the modern medical specialty of cytopathology. The complete works of Papanicolaou as the founder of exfoliative cytology include 5 books and 158 original articles, all of which are summarised in his monographs.

=== Controversy ===
Romanian physician Aurel Babeș made similar discoveries in the cytologic diagnosis of cervical cancer. He discovered that if a platinum loop (rather than a cotton swab, as used by Papanikolaou and by modern doctors) was used to collect cells from a woman's cervix, and the cells were then dried on a slide and stained, it could be determined if cancer cells were present. This was the first screening test to diagnose cervical and uterine cancer.

Babeș presented his findings to the Romanian Society of Gynaecology in Bucharest on 23 January 1927. His method of cancer diagnosis was published in a French medical journal, La Presse Médicale, on 11 April 1928, but Papanicolaou was not aware of Babeș's research. On the other hand, Babes was aware of Papanikolaou's studies. Moreover, the medical community has established that the two techniques are different in their design. Babeș's technique of preparing, staining and examining vaginal smears was substantially different from Papanicolaou's and would never have lent itself to mass screening for cervical cancer without modification.

Recent scientific papers have analyzed the ways that Babeș's method differed from Papanikolaou's and note that the paternity of the Pap test belongs solely to Papanicolaou.

Although a few scholars believe that Babeș was the true pioneer in the cytologic diagnosis of cervical cancer, Papanikolaou is still widely considered the pioneer in the field by mainstream scholarship. In Romania, cervical testing is referred to as the Méthode Babeș-Papanicolaou in honor of both scientists.

== Awards and honors ==
Papanikolaou was nominated 18 times over five years for the Nobel Prize, but never received the honor. This was likely because the prize is rarely awarded for diagnostic tools, as well as because a death of one of Papanikolaou's great admirers, who was a member of the Nobel Prize Committee, occurred around that time and also due to the committee's reluctance to award a Nobel Prize for another cancer discovery following a former embarrassing award in 1926 to Johannes Fibiger, who claimed that worms caused cancer. Nevertheless, Papanikolaou received many other prestigious prizes and awards for his discoveries, such as the Albert Lasker Award for Clinical Medical Research (the American equivalent to the Nobel Prize in Physiology), which he received in 1950. In total, he received hundreds of honorary awards.

These include honorary awards by the American Academy of Arts and Sciences, the Association of American Medical Colleges and the American Cancer Society. In 1949, the Medical School of the University of Athens named Papanikolaou an honorary doctorate, while the Academy of Athens in November 1957 proclaimed him an honorary member. In 1962, he was also posthumously given an award by the United Nations, after being nominated by the World Health Organization.

== Commemorations ==
In 1958 the Papanicolaou Award, the highest award given by the American Society of Cytopathology, was established in Papanikolaou's honor, and it has since been awarded annually.

In 1978 Papanikolaou's work was honored by the U.S. Postal Service with a 13-cent stamp for early cancer detection.

Between 1995 and 2001, his portrait appeared on the obverse of the Greek ₯10,000 banknote, until its replacement by the euro.

In 2011 A Man of Science, a statue portraying Papanicolaou, was permanently installed in Weill Cornell Medicine's main lobby at 1300 York Avenue, in New York City.

On 13 May 2019, the 136th anniversary of his birth, a Google Doodle featuring Papanikolaou was shown in North America, parts of South America, and parts of Europe and Israel. His and his wife Andromachi's efforts in the fight against cervical cancer, along with those of Helen Octavia Dickens and Hashime Murayama, featured in the documentary film The Cancer Detectives, which first aired on American Experience on 26 March 2024.
