= Ear picking =

Ear hygiene practice

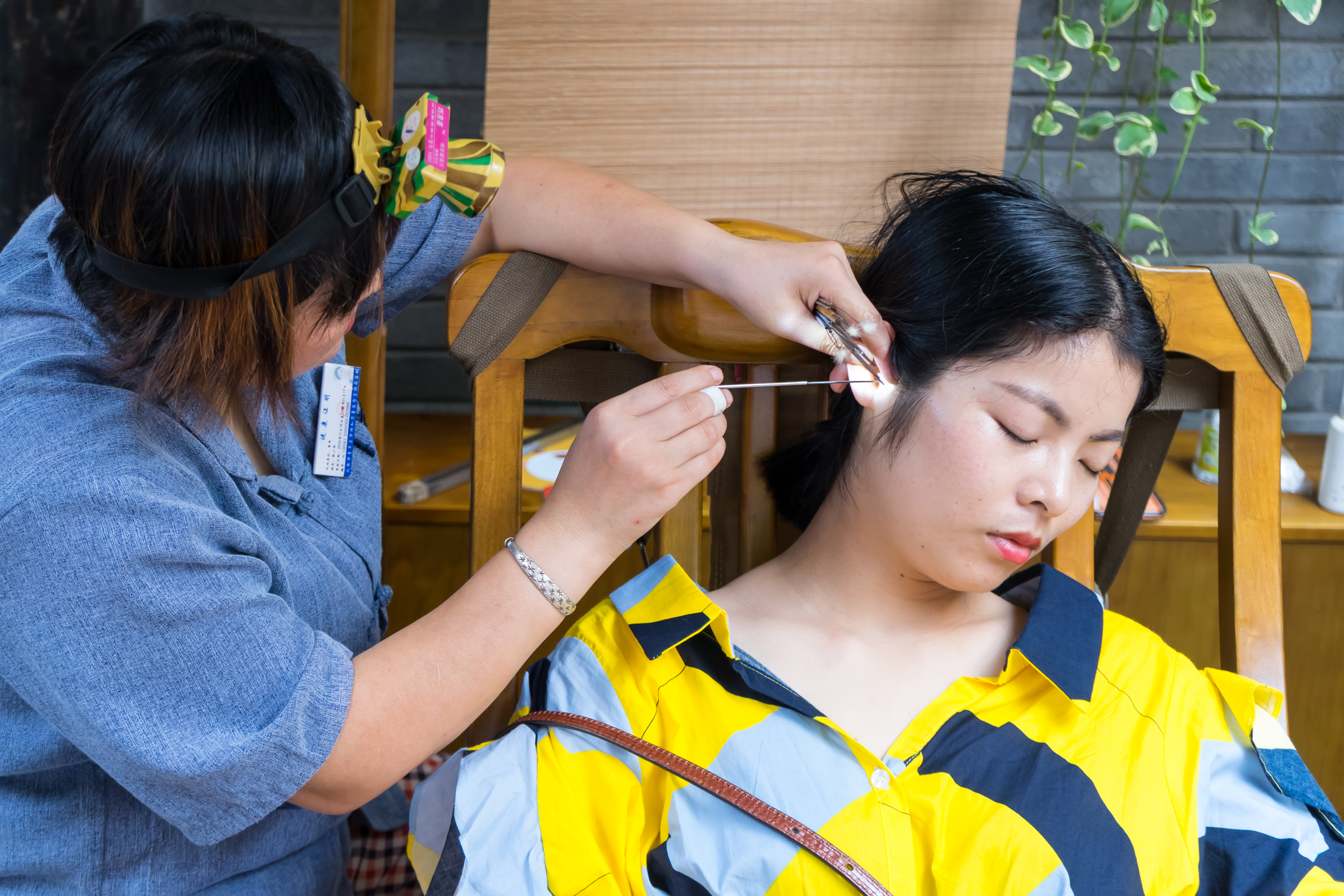
A ear-picking session in Chengdu, China

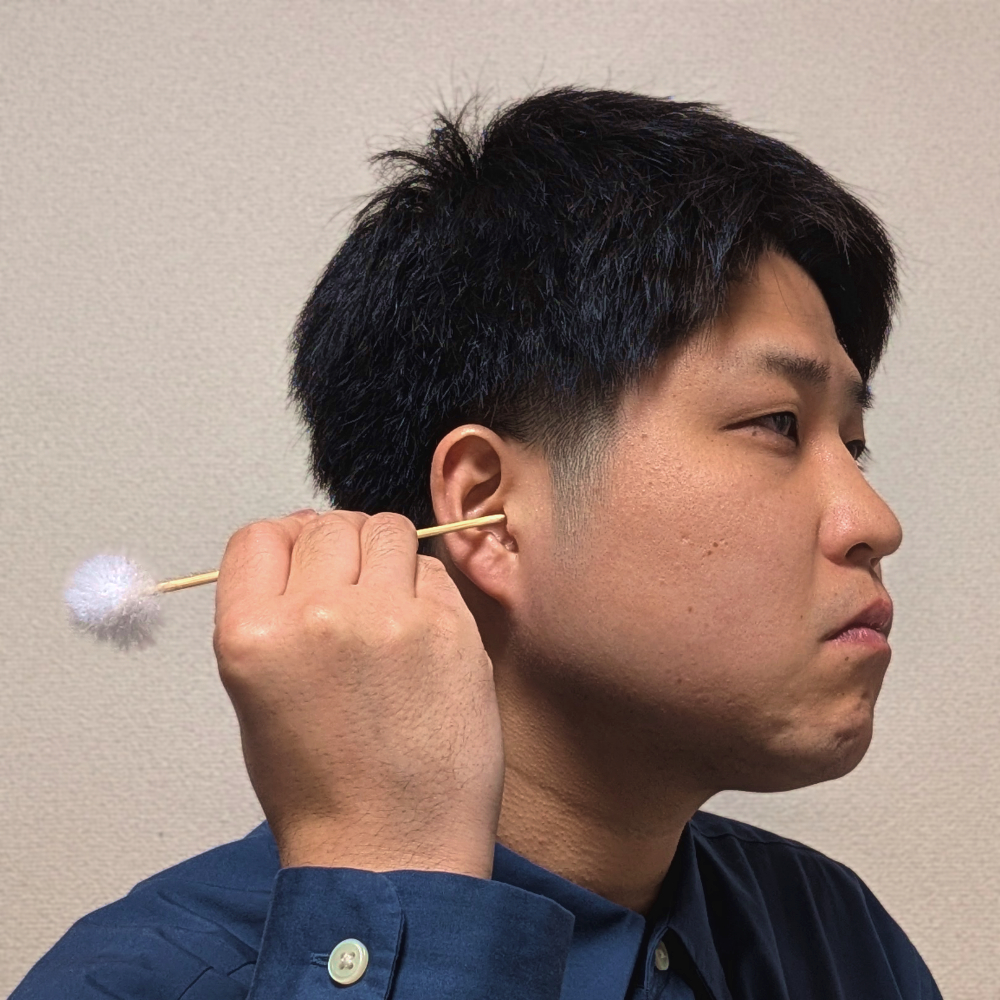
Japanese man using ear pick

Ear picking, also known as ear scooping (Chinese: simplified Chinese: 采耳; traditional Chinese: 採耳; pinyin: Cǎi ěr), is a type of traditional ear hygiene and leisure activity common in Asia. It involves the process of removing earwax using various tools. Ear picking service in China for leisure and pleasure dates back to the Song dynasty (960–1279 CE).

== Varieties ==
=== In China ===
The earliest records of ear-picking originated in the Han dynasty (202 BC–220 CE), and such leisure enjoyment was limited to the noble class until Tang dynasty (681–907 CE).

Ear-picking as a service originated in the Song dynasty (960–1279 CE) as part of the leisure options offered by tea house or public bathhouse. The Chinese-style ear-picking process involves specialized tools, massages, sound, and techniques that emphasize cleaning and stress relief. Aside from ear picks, ear-picking tools include cloud knives, ear spoons, ticklers made of goose feather, tuning forks, and peacock feathers for massages. The job requires extensive training in hand accuracy and steadiness.

Ear-picking services are especially common in the city of Chengdu, where they can be found in salons, public parks, roadsides, and tourist attractions. The Chengdu ear-picking custom was reportedly popularized during Ming dynasty (1368–1644 CE).

=== In Japan ===
Ear picking, known as mimi souji (耳そうじ, 耳掃除) in Japan, is a traditional leisure and ear hygiene activity in the country.

=== In Vietnam ===
Ear picking service in Vietnam is offered in barbershops along with massages. It’s commonly used by local people for ear cleaning, refreshment and stress relief.

== See also ==
- Ear pick
- Eustachian tube
- Oral hygiene
