= Leo Gerstenzang =

Polish-American inventor

Leo Gerstenzang (June 3, 1892 – January 31, 1961) was a Polish-American inventor who, in 1923, created the first contemporary cotton swab or Q-Tips. His product, which he named "Baby Gays," went on to become one of the most widely sold brand names. There are many anecdotes about how Gerstenzang came to create this invention. One is:

One day in 1923, Leo Gerstenzang found himself watching his wife, Ziuta, applying cotton wads to toothpicks in an attempt to reach hard-to-clean areas. Gerstenzang, inspired, soon produced a one-piece cotton swab.

However, according to U.S. Patent Case (C-10,415) Q-Tips, Inc. v. Johnson & Johnson, 108 F. Supp. 845 (D.N.J. 1952), it would appear that the first commercial producer of cotton tipped applicators was a Mrs. Hazel Tietjen Forbis, who manufactured them in her home. She also owned a patent on the article, numbered 1,652,108, dated December 6, 1927, and sold the product under the appellation Baby Nose-Gay. In 1925, The Leo Gerstenzang Co., Inc. purchased an assignment of the product patent from Mrs. Forbis. On January 2, 1937, Q-Tips, Inc's president, Mr. Leo Gerstenzang, and his wife Mrs. Ziuta Gerstenzang formed a partnership and purchased from Mrs Forbis "All merchandise, machinery and fixtures now contained in the premises 132 W. 36th Street and used by said Q-Tips, Inc., for the manufacture of Q-Tips or medicated swabs together with the accounts receivable of said Q-Tips, Inc." The contract recited that Q-Tips, Inc was the owner of patents covering the manufacture of applicators.

Gerstenzang was born into a Jewish family in Warsaw, then part of the Congress Kingdom of Poland. He immigrated to Chicago, Illinois, in 1912. From 1918 to 1919, he returned to Europe as a representative of the American Jewish Joint Distribution Committee. In 1919, he was still living in Chicago, and became a naturalized US citizen there on September 29, 1919. By 1921, he had moved to New York City.

He founded a company, called the Leo Gerstenzang Infant Novelty Company, to market his new product. In 1926, he changed the name of the product from Baby Gays to Q-Tips Baby Gays, where "Q" stood for quality or Cutie Tips. Eventually, the Baby Gays part was dropped and the product was called simply Q-Tips.

The Leo Gerstenzang Science Library honors him at Brandeis University.
