= Ear pick =

Type of curette to clean the ear

A bamboo ear pick with a down puff

A metal ear pick

Ear picks, also called ear scoops, or ear spoons, or earpicks, are a type of curette used to clean the ear canal of earwax (cerumen). They are preferred and are commonly used in East Asia, South Asia and Southeast Asia because Asians tend to develop dry ear wax.

In Asia, these are traditionally made from bamboo or precious metals such as silver or gold, but more commonly now, from stainless steel or plastic. European ear scoops produced up to the early 19th century were made from either bronze or precious metals such as silver.

Use of ear picks to remove wax is discouraged by some health professionals for fear of damaging the ear and causing infections.

== Types ==
Other than the wide variety of materials used to make them, ear picks vary widely in their tips and embellishments. Disposable plastic ear picks with a cotton swab at one end are increasingly popular.

=== Tips ===
- Ladle: The traditional and most commonly seen type of tip for the ear pick. They comprise a 0.2–0.5 cm (0.079–0.197 in) spoon or spatula.
- Loop(s): Tips made of single or multiple bent semi-nested loops of wire. The loops scrape and dislodge ear wax, which is then lodged in between the loops of wire. This tip does not function well in removing wet-type ear wax. A variation of this are wire loops twisted into a spiral, similar in shape to the tips of cotton swabs. The Jobson-Horne probe used in audiology and otolaryngology is in effect a loop-type ear-pick, where the ladle of the curette is fenestrated to effectively remove either dry or moist-type impacted earwax.
- Disks: Multiple circular disks, typically three, extend as hoops out from a thin cylindrical shaft.

=== Embellishments ===
- Down puff: A ball of goose down is located at the opposite end of the ear pick away from the tip. This is used to clean out tiny specks of flaky ear wax on the outer ear that may have broken off during the process of ear cleaning.
- Safety stop: A means of preventing deep insertion into ear canal to prevent eardrum injury.
- Illumination: A light bulb or LED shines light through the clear plastic tip (usually a Ladle type) of the ear pick to illuminate the inside of the ear canal, which eases ear cleaning.
- Figurine: A plastic or wooden figure, such as a small Daruma or cartoon characters are placed at the opposite end of the tip. They exist mainly to enhance the aesthetics of the ear pick.
- Toothpick: Some earpicks end with a pointed tail, which is used as a toothpick. This design is common in some Chinese and old European earpicks.
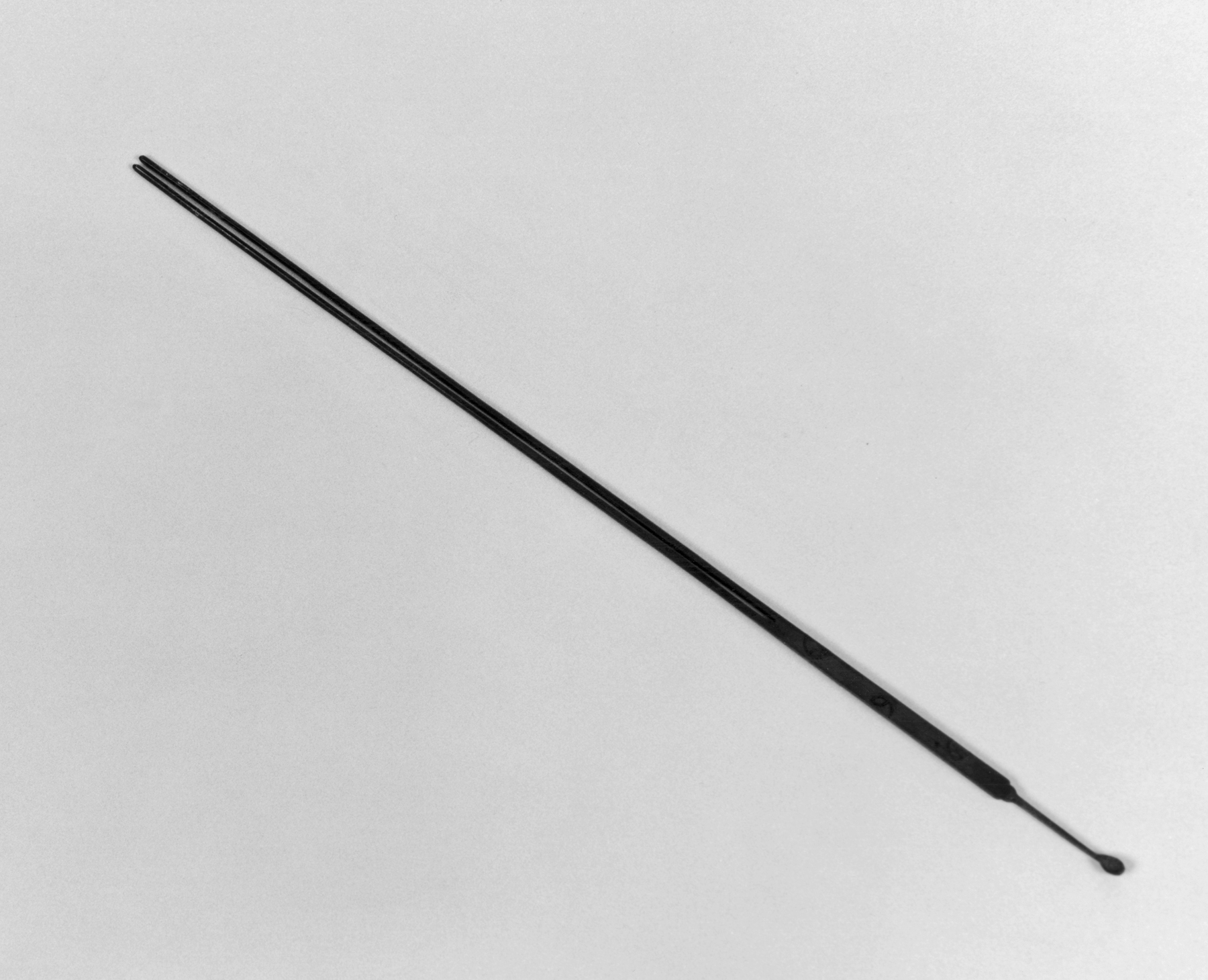
A traditional style hairpin earpick (mimikaki kanzashi)

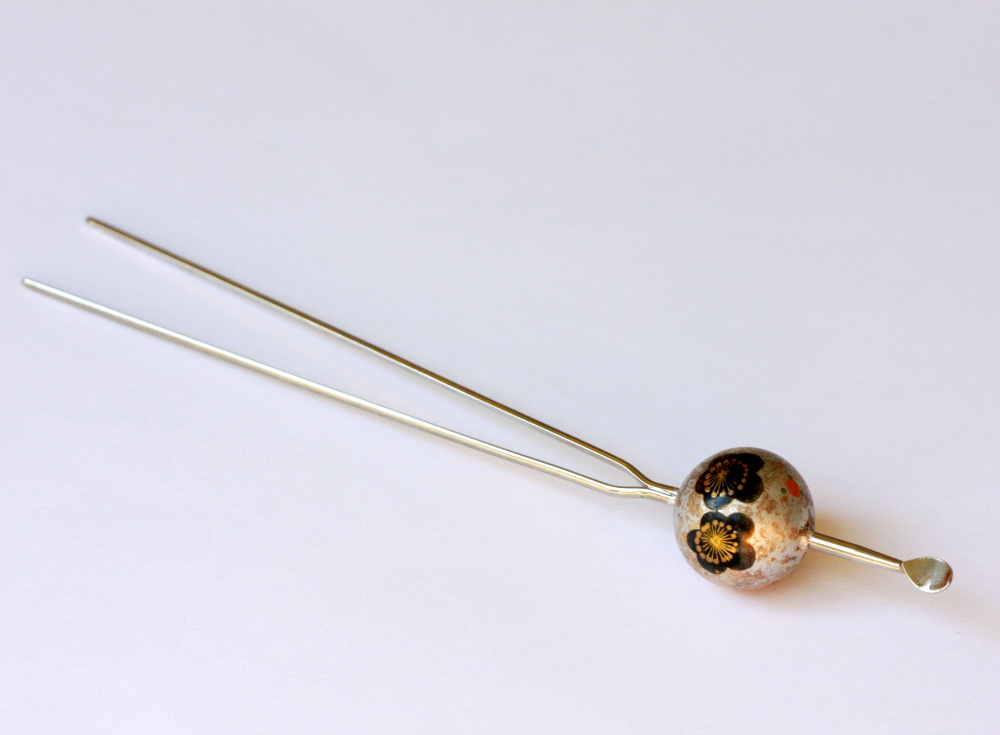
A modern hairpin earpick (mimikaki kanzashi)

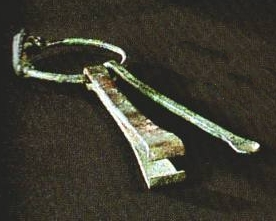
An ancient European bronze self-care utensil set (Toilettenbesteck) with earspoon and tweezers

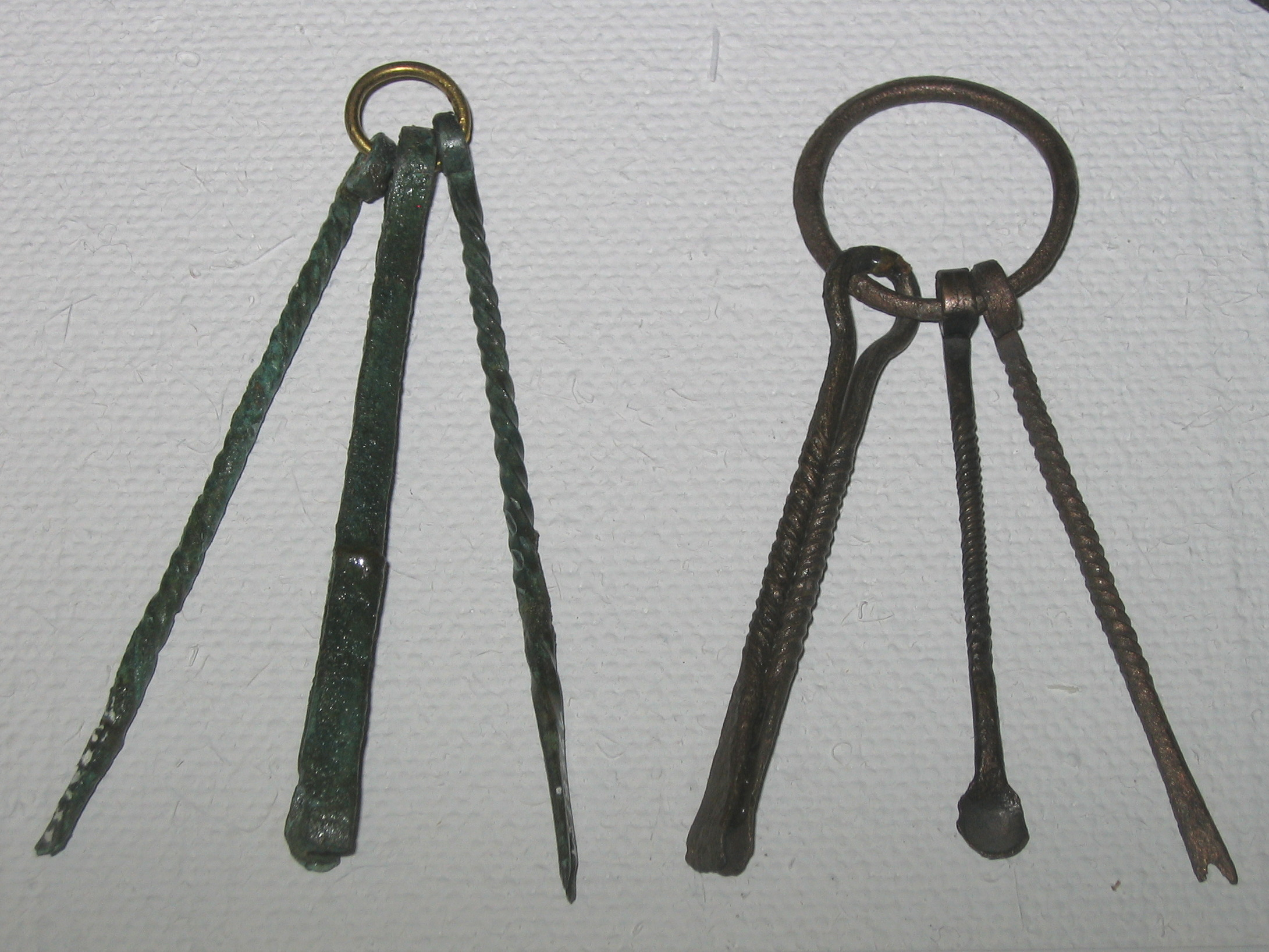
Bronze Swiss self-care utensils with a tweezer, earspoon, and a nail-cleaner. Likely worn as a Chatelaine.

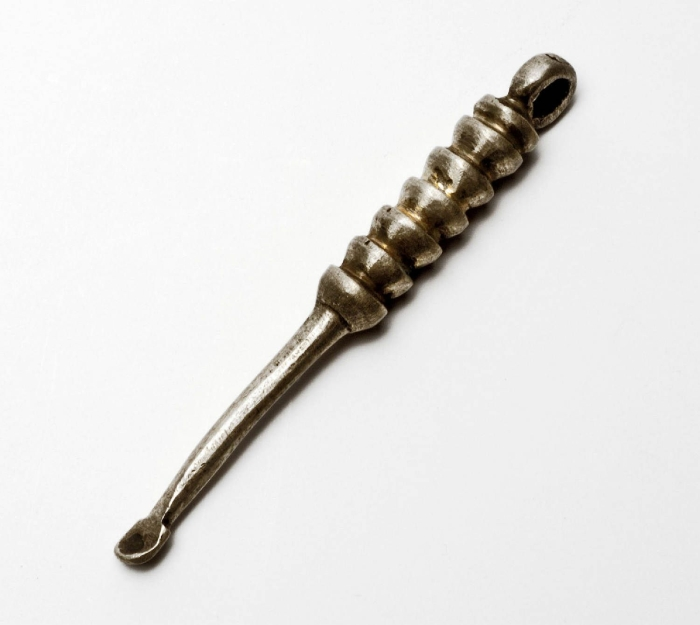
An Ethiopian ridged cylindrical earspoon made for wearing around the neck

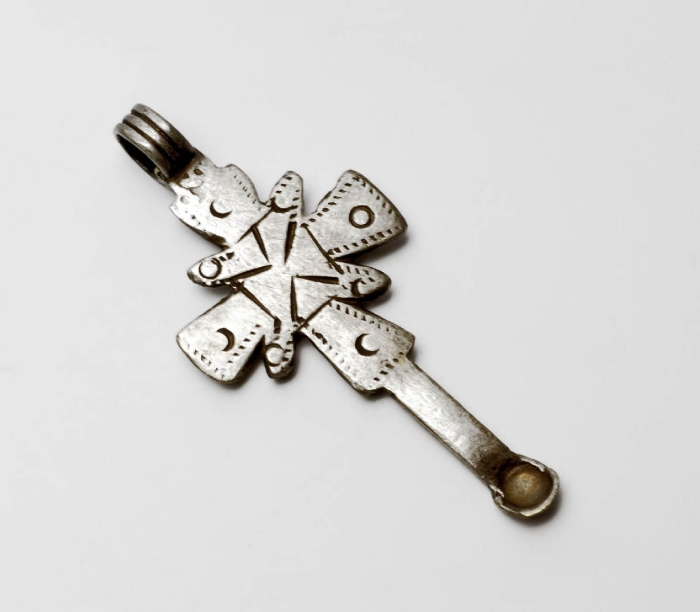
An Ethiopian cross-shaped silver earspoon made for wearing around the neck

== Culture ==
=== East and South Asian ===
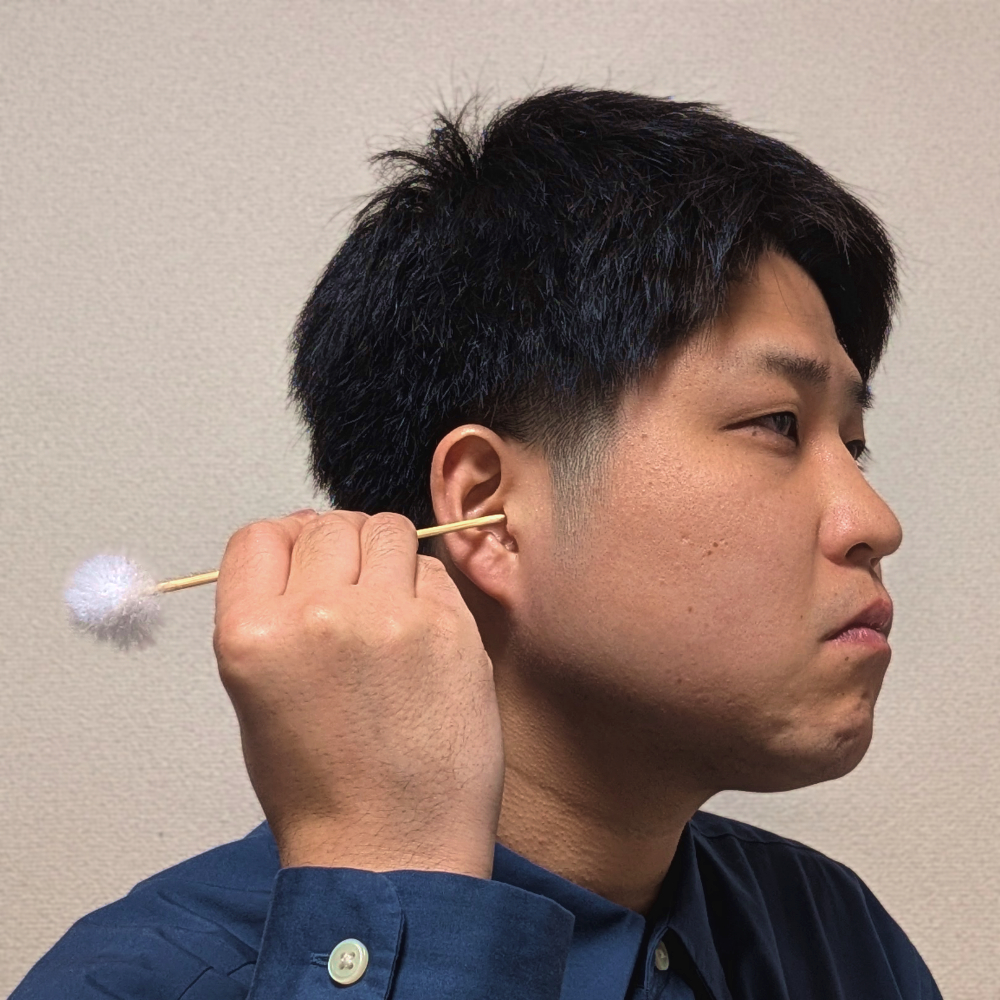
Japanese man using ear pick

Ear picks are a commonly used item and preferred for ear wax removal in East Asia, South Asia and Southeast Asia; most people in these areas have dry ear wax which can be easily removed using the tool.

It can be used individually or by another person. The person having their ears cleaned often lies or bends down with their head in the lap of the person doing the cleaning. The cleaning of ears is often performed by a parent on a child or, among adults, by one's partner. It may also be performed by professional (non-medical) ear cleaners on the streets of cities in countries such as India, China, and Vietnam.

Some individuals find ear-picking to be highly pleasurable, thus contributing to the popularity of this service being offered in Asian establishments such as massage parlors, spas, and salons.

=== European ===
Ear-spoons and ear picks are found dating from the post-medieval period of British history back into the Roman times. Ear-spoons have also been found in Scandinavian archeological Viking-age dig sites. Ornate ear scoops have also been found in 9th century Anglo-saxon sites.

== Potential hazards ==
The practice of ear picking may pose health hazards to the human ear if performed incorrectly. One potential danger is that of accidentally puncturing the eardrum and/or breaking the auditory ossicles while ear picking. Usage of unsterilized ear picks can also cause infection when they are shared among different individuals.

Ear cleaning in general may also be ineffective when used by one with little experience or guidance. When done incorrectly, significant amounts of ear wax may be pushed deeper into the ear canal rather than removed. The lining of the ear is delicate and can be easily damaged. Furthermore, the ear itself is to an extent self-cleaning, and produces earwax as protection from dirt, dust, and bacterial infections.

== See also ==
- Ear picking
- Cotton swab
