= Helen Octavia Dickens =

American physician (1909–2001)

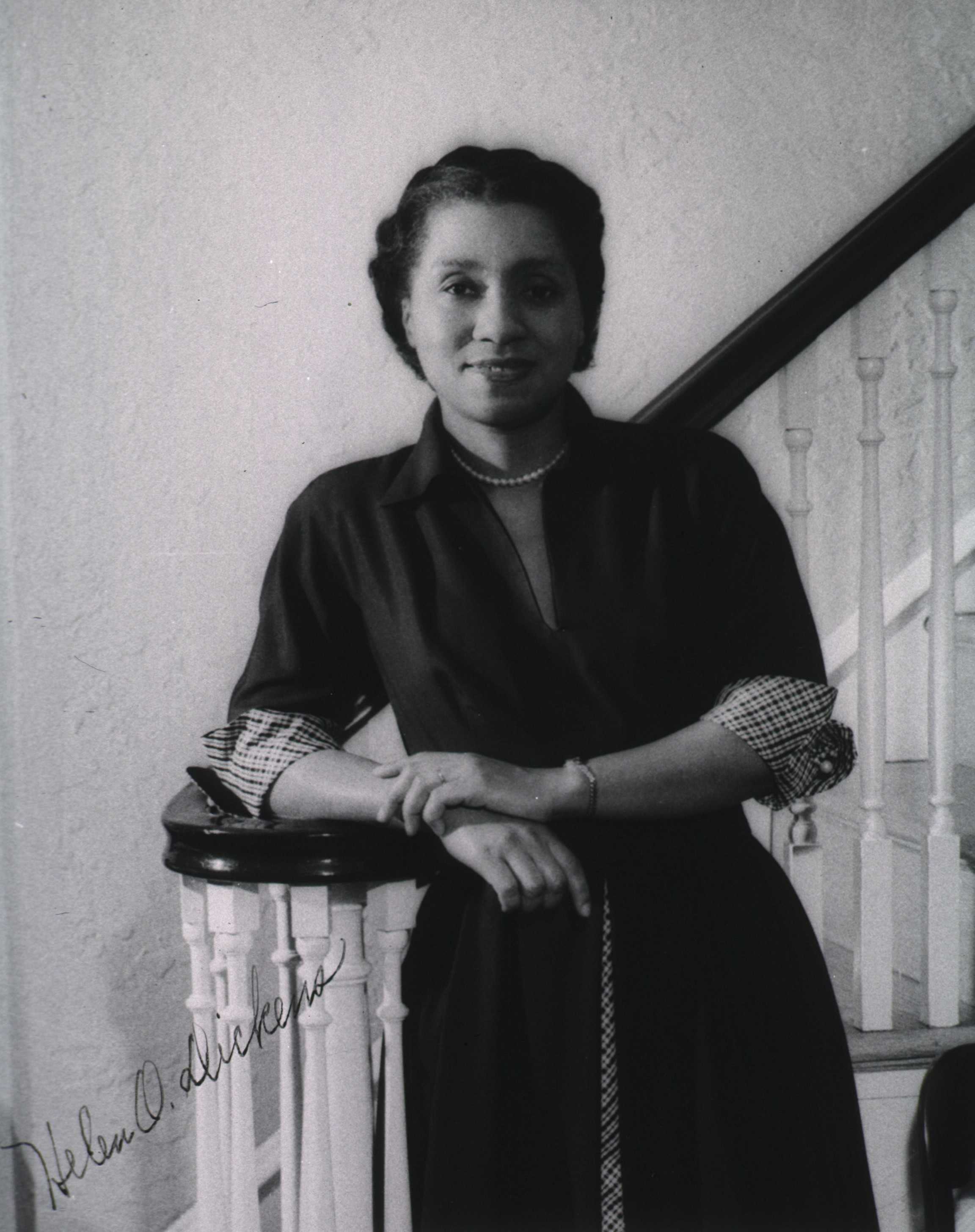
- Dickens c. 1950
- Born: February 21, 1909; Dayton, Ohio
- Died: December 2, 2001 (aged 92); Philadelphia, Pennsylvania
- Education: Malcolm X College; University of Illinois
- Occupations: Surgeon; Professor of Obstetrics and Gynecology
- Medical career
- Institutions: Mercy Douglass Hospital

Helen Octavia Dickens (February 21, 1909 – December 2, 2001) was an American physician, medical and social activist, health equity advocate, researcher, health administrator, and health educator. She was the first African-American woman to be admitted to the American College of Surgeons in 1950, and specialized in Obstetrics and Gynecology.

Dickens worked at several private practices and clinics including the Aspiranto Health Home founded by Dr. Virginia Alexander, and the Teen Clinic at The University of Pennsylvania which she founded. Strongly motivated to provide better healthcare to the African-American community, these jobs enabled Dickens to combat the racial and residential segregation integrated into medicine at the time.

== Biography ==
Dickens was born on February 21, 1909, in Dayton, Ohio. Born to Charles Warren Dickens and Daisy Jane Green Dickens, Helen Dickens was the oldest of their three children.

=== Parents ===
Her father, Charles Warren Dickens, a former slave and water boy during the Civil War, was raised by a Union colonel from the age of 9. He took the name Charles Dickens after meeting the British novelist. He was self-educated and had a keen intellect, but prejudice confined him to janitorial work. Knowing the value of education, Charles Dickens later attended Wilberforce University and Oberlin College before moving to Dayton, Ohio where he would meet and marry Helen Dickens' mother. Her mother, Daisy Jane Dickens (née Green), originally from Canada, was a domestic servant to the Reynolds family of paper manufacturers. Daisy's sister was Chicago director Pearl G. Pachaco.

=== Educational Background ===
Both of Dickens' parents encouraged her to attend desegregated schools in order to receive a better education. Dickens' father encouraged all of his children to stay motivated to become educated and pursue any career they pleased. With this instilled in her, Dickens' decided that she wanted to graduate high school at 17 instead of 18, and did so by taking night classes.

After completing her primary education, Dickens earned a full-tuition scholarship to attend Crane Junior College in Chicago where she studied pre-medical classes. During her time at Crane Junior College, Dickens faced great adversity as both a Black student and a woman. Many of her peers made gesture against and toward her; however, she often positioned herself in the front seat to have a clear view of the professor and blackboard and to eliminate her view of her classmates.

Following her time at Crane Junior College, Dickens achieved her B.S. from the University of Illinois in 1932, her M.D. from the University of Illinois College of Medicine in 1934, and her master's degree in medical science from the University of Pennsylvania in 1943. She was one of two women in her class and was the only African-American woman in her class.

=== Marriage and Family ===
Dickens married Dr. Purvis Henderson in 1943, and had two children, Dr. Jayne Henderson Brown and Norman Henderson.

== Career ==
Dickens interned at Chicago's Provident Hospital for two years, treating tuberculosis among the poor, and then became a resident in Obstetrics. She was drawn to Virginia M. Alexander, who founded the Aspiranto Health Home, which was based in a three-story North Philadelphia house. During this time she provided gynecological and obstetric care as well as general practice. She worked with poor and underprivileged people, in very difficult conditions. For example, in one instance, she arrived at the home of a woman in labor to find that there was no electricity. The bed had to be moved so the delivery could be carried out using the light from the street. To address such problems, Dr. Alexander installed four beds at the Aspiranto.

After working there for seven years, she wanted to further her education in gynecology and obstetrics, and spent a year at the Perelman School of Medicine at the University of Pennsylvania. She passed the board examinations and became the first female African American board-certified Ob/gyn in Philadelphia.

In 1943, Dickens was accepted into a residency at Harlem Hospital in New York City. She finished her residency in 1946 and was certified by the American College of Obstetricians and Gynecologists in the same year.

In 1948, she became director of the Department of Obstetrics and Gynecology at Philadelphia's racially segregated Mercy Douglass hospital, where she remained until 1967.

After leaving the hospital in 1967, Dickens opened a clinic at Penn that was devoted and specialized to helping and supporting teen parents. The clinic offered services such as group counseling, therapy, education, and prenatal care. After 2 years of the clinic being opened, in 1969, Dickens was then named the dean for minority admissions. Over the course of 5 years, she helped increase the number of minority students at Penn from 3 to 64.

During her time, working for Penn, she eventually earned an honorary degree from them in 1982 and earned one back in 1979 from the Medical College of Pennsylvania.

Throughout her career, Dickens published several articles and contributed chapters to several books on teen pregnancy and prevention and adolescent health issues. In an interview, Dickens noted that her work appeared in "Pan American Medical Women's Journal, American Practice and Diagnosis of Treatment, American Journal of OB/GYN, American Journal of Public Health, Journal of Marriage and Family Counseling, American Journal of Orthopsychiatry, and Women's Wellness".

=== Research ===
While running the clinic, Dickens did extensive research regarding teen pregnancy and sexually transmitted infections, using her knowledge and results of her research to educate young mothers.

She also did a lot of work in cancer services and education. Dickens instigated a program, funded by the National Institute of Health, to carry out pap tests to detect cervical cancer.

During Dickens' career, she received a lot of awards and recognition for her work. Some of these awards included: Gimbel Philadelphia Award for "outstanding service to humanity, " the Medical Woman of the Year, Distinguished Daughter of Pennsylvania, Daisy Lumpkin Award, the Mercy Douglass Hospital Award, and the Sadie Alexander Award for community service by Delta Sigma Theta.

== Death ==
Dickens died from complications of a stroke at age 92 at Hahnemann University Hospital on December 2, 2001.

== Awards and legacy ==
She received a Candace Award from the National Coalition of 100 Black Women in 1986.

In 1991, she was awarded the most prestigious award at the Penn's Women of Color celebration. This award was named after her, Dr. Helen O. Dickens Lifetime Achievement Award. This award was given to candidates who had a long history of helping Women of Color in the Penn and Delaware Valley communities.

She donated papers from the latter part of her career to the University of Pennsylvania in 1994 (accession number 1994: 62) with a further donation accessioned in 2002 (accession number 2002:7).

Dickens' efforts in the fight against cervical cancer, along with that of Georgios and Andromachi Papanikolaou and Hashime Murayama, are featured in the documentary film The Cancer Detectives which first aired on American Experience on March 26, 2024.
