= Andromachi Papanikolaou =

Greek laboratory technician (c. 1890–1982)

Andromachi "Mary" Mavrogeni Papanikolaou (Note: Greek: Ανδρομάχη Μαυρογένη Παπανικολάου; her name is transcribed differently in various sources; her first name is written as either Andromahi, Andromachi or Andromache, her maiden name as Mavroyeni, Mavrogeni, Mavrogenis or Mavrogenous, and her last name as Papanikolaou or Papanicolaou.) (c. 1890 – 13 October 1982) was a Greek laboratory technician and the wife of Georgios Papanikolaou, the Greek pathologist who independently invented the pap test. For 21 years, Mary Papanikolaou volunteered to have her cervix sampled and smeared by her husband to help with his efforts to create the pap test, which has been shown to reduce cervical cancer deaths by up to 80 percent.

== Early life ==
Born Andromachi Mavrogeni, Papanikolaou was the descendant of the Phanariote Mavrogenis family, which made history fighting against the Ottomans in the Greek War of Independence. She received a good education, could speak French and could play the piano. She met her husband Georgios on a ferry boat journey to Athens, and he fell in love with her charming personality. Papanikolaou eloped with her husband shortly after he obtained his PhD in zoology at the Ludwig-Maximilians-Universität München in 1910. After returning to Greece following the death of Georgios' mother, the couple immigrated to New York City on 9 October 1913. Neither Papanikolaou nor her husband spoke English, and they had between them only $250, the amount then required to enter the U.S. Papanikolaou took a job at Gimbel's Department Store as a seamstress, sewing buttons for $5 per week. Her husband took a series of odd jobs before obtaining a position at New York Hospital's Pathology Department and Cornell University Medical College's Anatomy Department, where Papanikolaou joined him as an unpaid technician.

== Contribution to research ==
Throughout her husband's career, Papanikolaou managed both his laboratory affairs and the couple's household affairs. At Cornell, Georgios was observing the ovulatory cycle of guinea pigs, but because he was not a clinician, he lacked access to patients. For 21 years, Mary Papanikolaou volunteered as an experimental subject for her husband, climbing up onto his examination couch every day so that he could sample and smear her cervix. She was quoted as saying: "There was no other option but for me to follow him inside the lab, making his way of life mine" and also decided not to have children so she could continue collaborating with her husband.

Partly through his wife's volunteer efforts, Georgios was able to determine that the monthly changes to guinea pig vaginal discharge that he observed in the lab could also be seen in humans. To provide additional subjects for her husband's research, Mary Papanikolaou also held a party for some female friends, who agreed to have their own cervixes sampled. After one of these women was later diagnosed with cervical cancer, Georgios took her sample back to the lab and, with the help of another cytologist, determined that cancerous cells were indeed visible on the sample. In Georgios' own words: “The first observation of cancer cells in the smear of the uterine cervix gave me one of the greatest thrills I ever experienced during my scientific career.”

The Pap test is still widely used as a means of early cancer detection and is estimated to have reduced fatalities caused by cancer of the reproductive systems in women by half. By some accounts, the pap test is considered the most significant advance in the control of cancer in the 20th century.

== Death ==
Mary Papanicolaou continued her husband's work at the Papanicolaou Cancer Research Institute after his death on February 19, 1962. She died in Miami in October 1982.

== Legacy ==
Georgios and Andromachi Papanikolaou's efforts in the fight against cervical cancer, along with that of Helen Octavia Dickens and Hashime Murayama, are featured in the documentary film The Cancer Detectives which first aired on American Experience on March 26, 2024.

== Notes ==
If one is to respect the person, her married name is "Papanicolaou". This is how her husband George spelled his name in all his publications and how she and he signed their names.
