= Pearl G. Pachaco =

American community leader

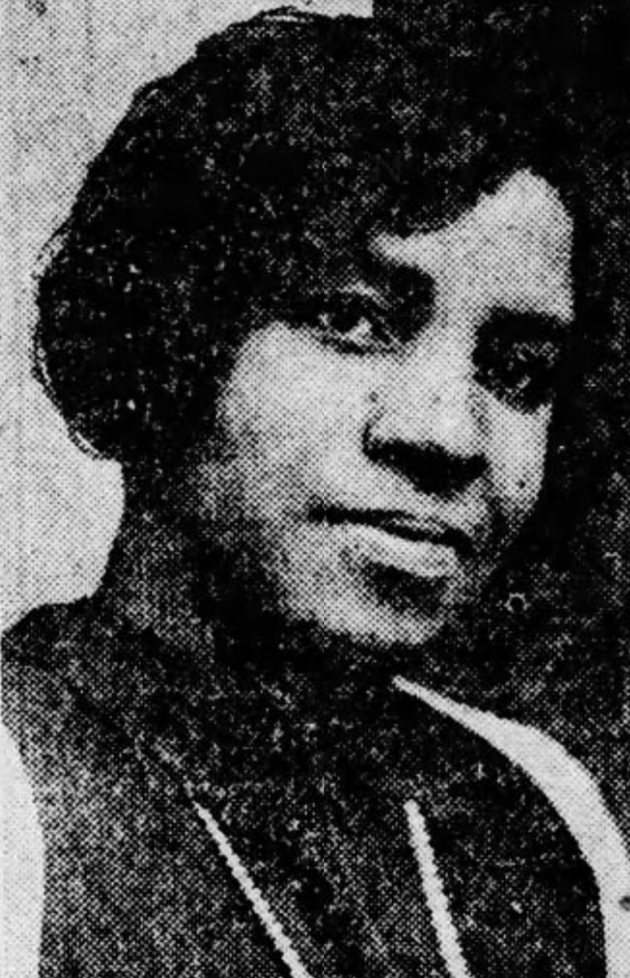
- Pachaco, from a 1928 newspaper
- Born: Pearl Greene; October 13, 1890; Paulding, Ohio, U.S.
- Died: October 14, 1976 (aged 86); Fort Wayne, Indiana, U.S.
- Other name: Pearl Pachaco Williams
- Occupations: Community leader, theatre professional, recreation director
- Relatives: Helen Octavia Dickens (niece)

Pearl Greene Pachaco Williams (October 13, 1890 – October 14, 1976) was an American recreation director, theatre professional, and community leader, based in Chicago. She was longtime director of the Richard B. Harrison Players and the Mildred B. Haessler Ballet, beginning in the 1930s. She was also active in Girl Scouting and served on the board of a credit union.

== Early life and education ==
Greene was from Paulding, Ohio, the daughter of Simon Greene and Anna Suell Greene. She attended Ohio State University, Northwestern University, and the DeSilva School of Dramatics in Indiana. Physician Helen Octavia Dickens was her niece.

In 1927, while she was training as a recreational director at Hull House, Pachaco was denied a table at the Women's Exchange cafeteria in Evanston, Illinois, on the basis of her race. Her white companions were welcomed, but they left when she was refused service. The NAACP sued the cafeteria over the incident.

== Career ==
=== Theatre and dance ===
Pachaco was a recreation director in Dayton, Fort Wayne, and Chicago. She lectured on drama, and was a founding member and dramatic director of the Richard B. Harrison Players in Chicago. She directed Androcles and the Lion in 1935, New Day in 1945, A Christmas Carol in 1946, Hi Neighbor in 1947, Rocket to the Moon in 1955, and Among Our Selves in 1958.

Beginning in 1937, Pachaco worked with dance educator Mildred B. Haessler to build a ballet program at the Rosenwald Building, The two directed the Haessler Ballet together through the 1950s. She retired as assistant director of the Haessler Ballet in 1961.

She wrote and published "The Black experience in Little Theatre and the Richard B. Harrison Players" with Aurelia Powell Henton in her later years.

=== Other community work ===
Pachaco arranged for Spanish classes at the Rosenwald building in 1940. She was active in the Near West Side Interracial Council. She was secretary of the People's Consumer Co-operative Credit Union, and the only woman on the credit union's board of directors in 1941. She was still secretary of the credit union in 1961.

Pachaco was active in Girl Scouting. She represented Girl Scouts of the Midwest at a national meeting in Philadelphia in 1939, and at an international Girl Scouts meeting in New York in 1945. She spoke at a regional Girl Scout leaders' meeting in 1946.

== Personal life ==
Pearl Greene married artist Anthony Pachaco (Antonio Pacheco) in 1924. She married again the 1940s. She died in 1976, in Fort Wayne, at the age of 86.
