= Cerumenolytic =

Ear wax softening agent

- Drug class
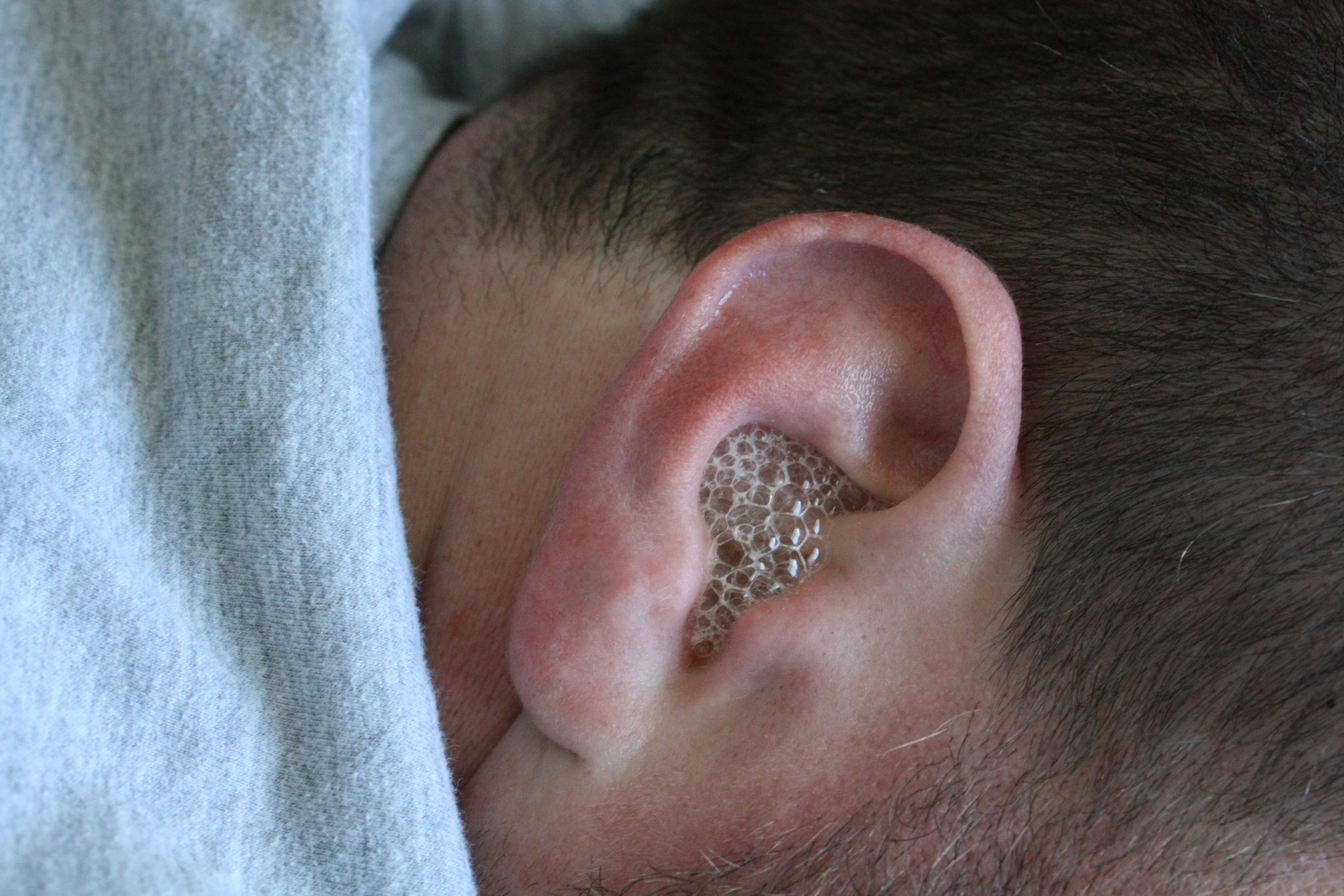
- Hydrogen peroxide, a common cerumenolytic, bubbles after being administered into a person's ear.

Legal status

A cerumenolytic is an ear wax (cerumen) softening agent. Common cerumenolytics such as hydrogen peroxide and hydrogen peroxide - urea (also called carbamide peroxide) are topical preparations used to facilitate the removal of ear wax. Their side effects tend to be mild, including ear discomfort, transient loss of hearing, dizziness, and local irritation.

== Medical uses ==
Cerumenolytics are used to soften and break up ear wax. Using a cerumenolytic can reduce the need for flushing the ear with irrigants for wax removal. Additionally, cerumenolytics can also facilitate the manual removal of ear wax. Overall, all cerumenolytics are considered to be equivalent in efficacy. Cerumenolytics are administered directly into the ear, which is a form of topical administration that can be specified as "ototopical." Generally, the use of a cerumenolytic involves instilling several drops of the product into the affected ear once or twice daily for a treatment duration of 3 to 5 days. Each instillation is relatively quick (less than 5 minutes) and can be done either at home or in a clinical setting. However, like all ear wax treatments, the ear wax can reaccumulate in the ear after treatment, necessitating further treatment. Cerumenolytics are not recommended in children less than 3 years-old.

=== Available forms and classification ===
Cerumenolytics are available as topical preparations intended for installation into the ear. Cerumenolytics can be classified based upon the formulation of their constituents: water based, oil based, or neither.

Available cerumenolytics
Classification	Product/preparation	Active chemical constituents
Water based	1. Acetic acid 2. Cerumenex; 3. Colace; 4. Hydrogen peroxide 5. Sodium bicarbonate 6. Sterile saline solution	1. Aqueous acetic acid 2. Triethanolamine polypeptide oleate-condensate 3. Docusate sodium 4. Hydrogen peroxide solution 5. Sodium bicarbonate 6. Water
Oil based	1. Almond oil 2. Peanut oil 3. Earex; 4. Olive oil 5. Mineral oil/liquid petrolatum	1. Almond oil 2. Peanut oil 3. Peanut oil, almond oil, rectified camphor oil 4. Olive oil 5. Liquid petrolatum
Neither	1. Audax; 2. Debrox	1. Choline salicylate, glycerine 2. Carbamide peroxide (urea-hydrogen peroxide)

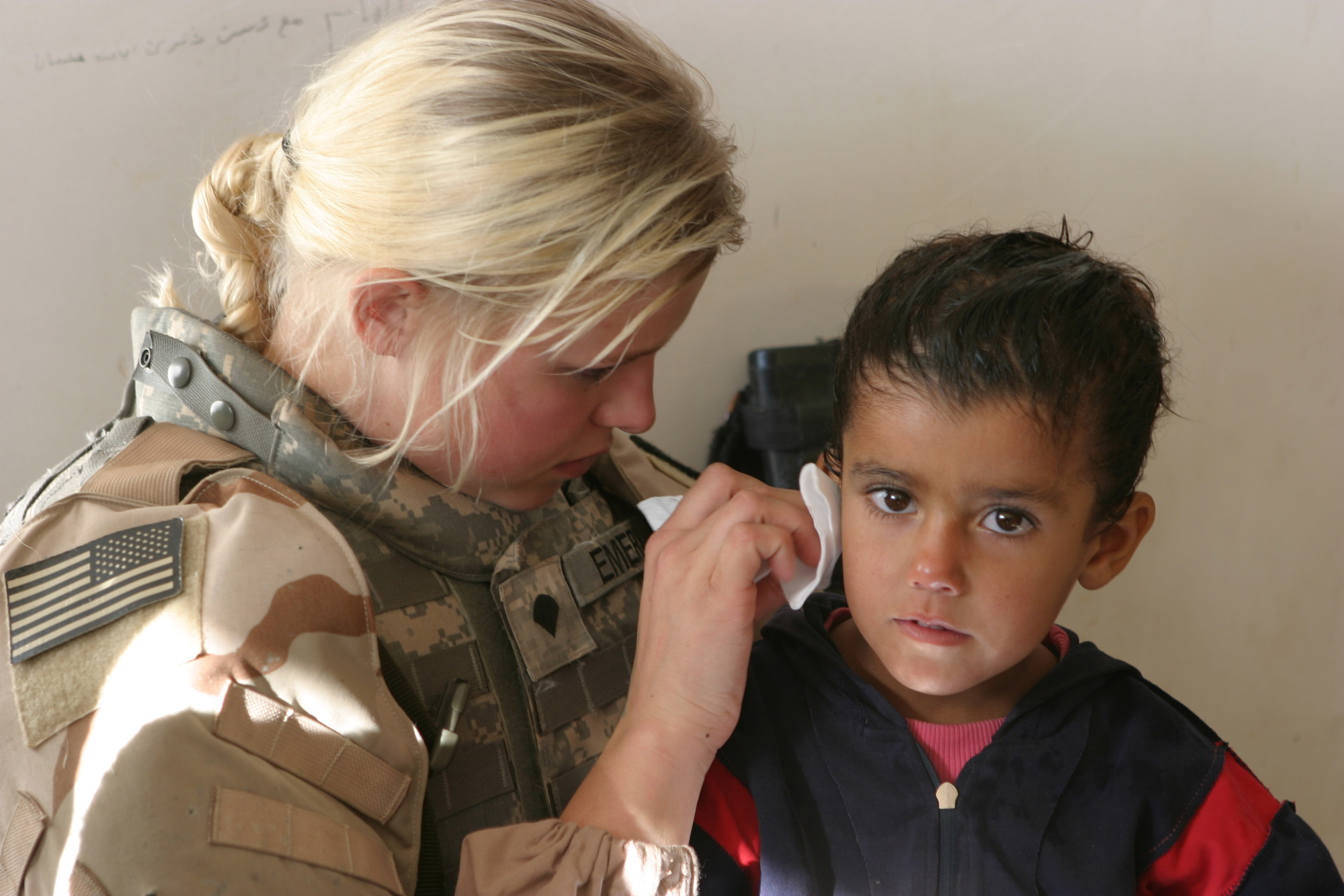
A member of the U.S. Army cleans the ear of an Iraqi child.

== Contraindications ==
Cerumenolytics should not be used in ears that in which the ear drum has been perforated or is otherwise nonintact. Cerumenolytics should also be avoided in ears that are actively infected due to the lack of research in this area (i.e. people with otitis externa, a type of ear infection).

== Adverse effects ==
In general, cerumenolytics can cause ear discomfort, transient loss of hearing, dizziness, and local irritation. Local reactions are least frequent with cerumenolytics that lack organic chemicals, such as a saline.

== Overdose ==
Using the cerumenolytic hydrogen peroxide as an example, no adverse effects are expected with overdose of an otic administered preparation. The average middle ear volume is 0.4 mL, which limits otic accumulation in overdose. It is unlikely that an cerumenolytic administered into the ear would cause systemic toxicity in an overdose situation, due to the lack of systemic absorption resulting from minimal volume flow within the inner ear. However, again using hydrogen peroxide as an example, clinically relevant overdoses of cerumenolytics are possible if the drugs are administered by other routes (e.g. by mouth).

== Pharmacology ==
The mechanism of action of cerumenolytics vary by the classification. Water-based cerumenolytics, including water itself, work by hydrating ear wax, fragmenting corneocytes (a type of skin cell) within the ear wax itself. Cerumenolytics with peroxides release oxygen upon contact with the skin, inducing effervescence (bubbling) that mechanically fragments ear wax. Oil-based cerumenolytics provide lubrication to the ear wax, softening the surface without fragmenting the ear wax. The mechanism of action of non-water- and non-oil-based cerumenolytics is unknown. Using carbamide peroxide as an example, the pharmacokinetics of cerumenolytics are not well studied.

== Veterinary use ==
Cerumenolytics are used to treat cerumen impaction in cats and dogs. The removal of cerumen is also an important step in the treatment of otitis in small animals. Veterinary cerumenolytics possess different potencies. Diocytl sodium sulfosuccinate (DOSS), dioctyl calcium sulfosuccinate, and urea or carbamide peroxide are considered to be potent veterinary cerumenolytics.
