= Hashime Murayama =

Japanese American artist (1879–1954)

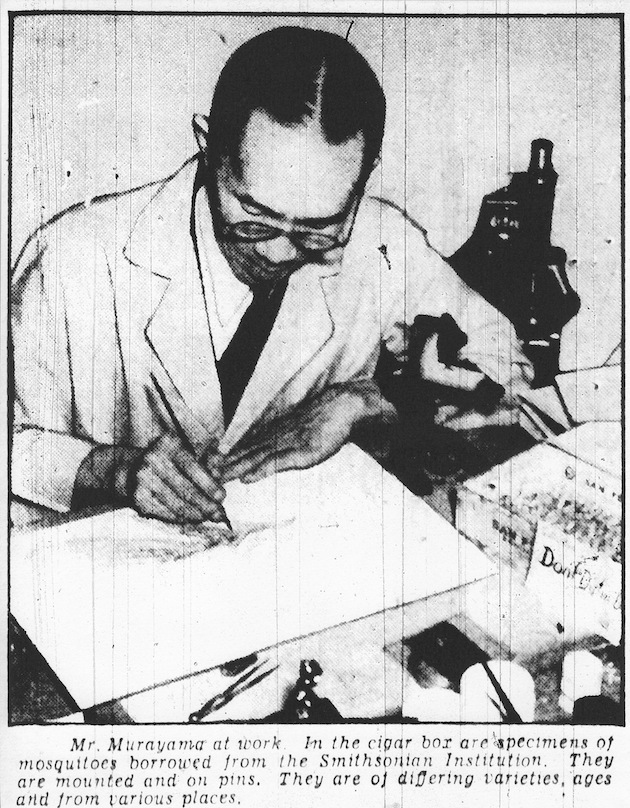
- Hashime Murayama, 1939
- Born: 1879; Japan
- Died: 1954 (aged 74–75); United States
- Occupations: artist, scientific illustrator

Hashime Murayama (1879–1954) was a Japanese American painter and scientific illustrator. He was best known for his exquisite paintings of birds, insects, fish, mammals, and other wildlife. Employed by the National Geographic Society from 1921 to 1941, his work was featured in The National Geographic Magazine.

During World War II he was interned in the USA for being Japanese. Despite this, he worked with George Papanicolaou at Cornell University, creating images of cancer cells that were used to train diagnosticians and prove the effectiveness of the Pap smear as a life-saving cancer screening method.

== Life ==
Hashime Murayama was born in Japan in 1879, and graduated in 1905 from the Kyoto Imperial Art Industry College. He came to the United States the following year. In 1910 his teacher’s daughter, Nao Makino, joined him, and they were married in New York City. Their sons Ken and Sutemi were born in 1911 and 1919.

Hashime Murayama was employed as a technician at Weill Cornell Medicine for several years, preparing slides, doing microscope drawings, and making models for anatomical study. In 1914 he patented a technique for mounting biological tissues to prepare them for photography. While at Cornell, he became a friend of Greek-born doctor and researcher George Papanicolaou.

Hashime Murayama also pursued a career as an artist, often visiting the New York Aquarium where he painted fish among the plants and rocks of their environment. He paid close attention to details such as the exact number of scales on a fish, and combined this scientific accuracy with vivid artistic treatments of color and light.

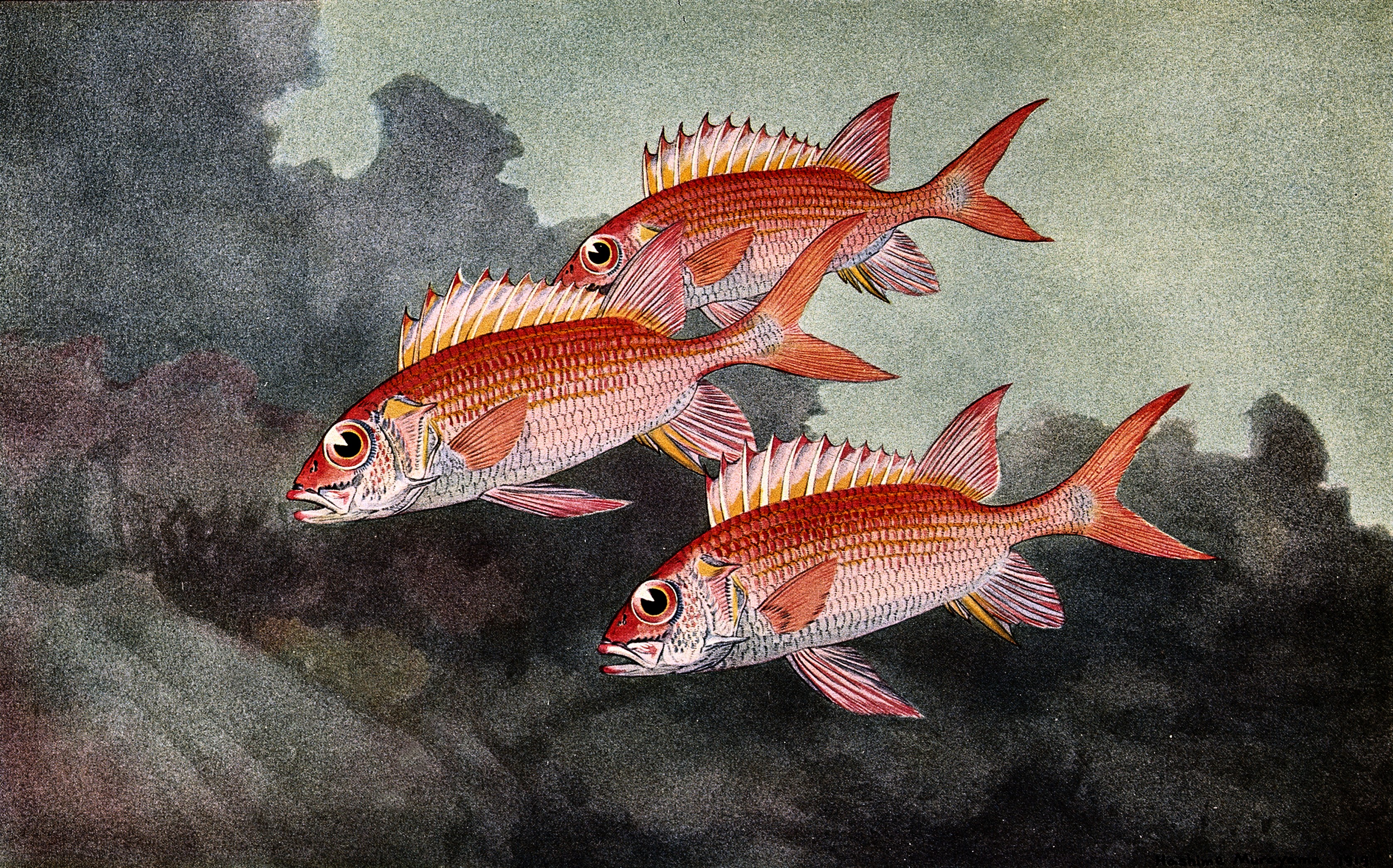
Three squirrel fish swimming in the sea

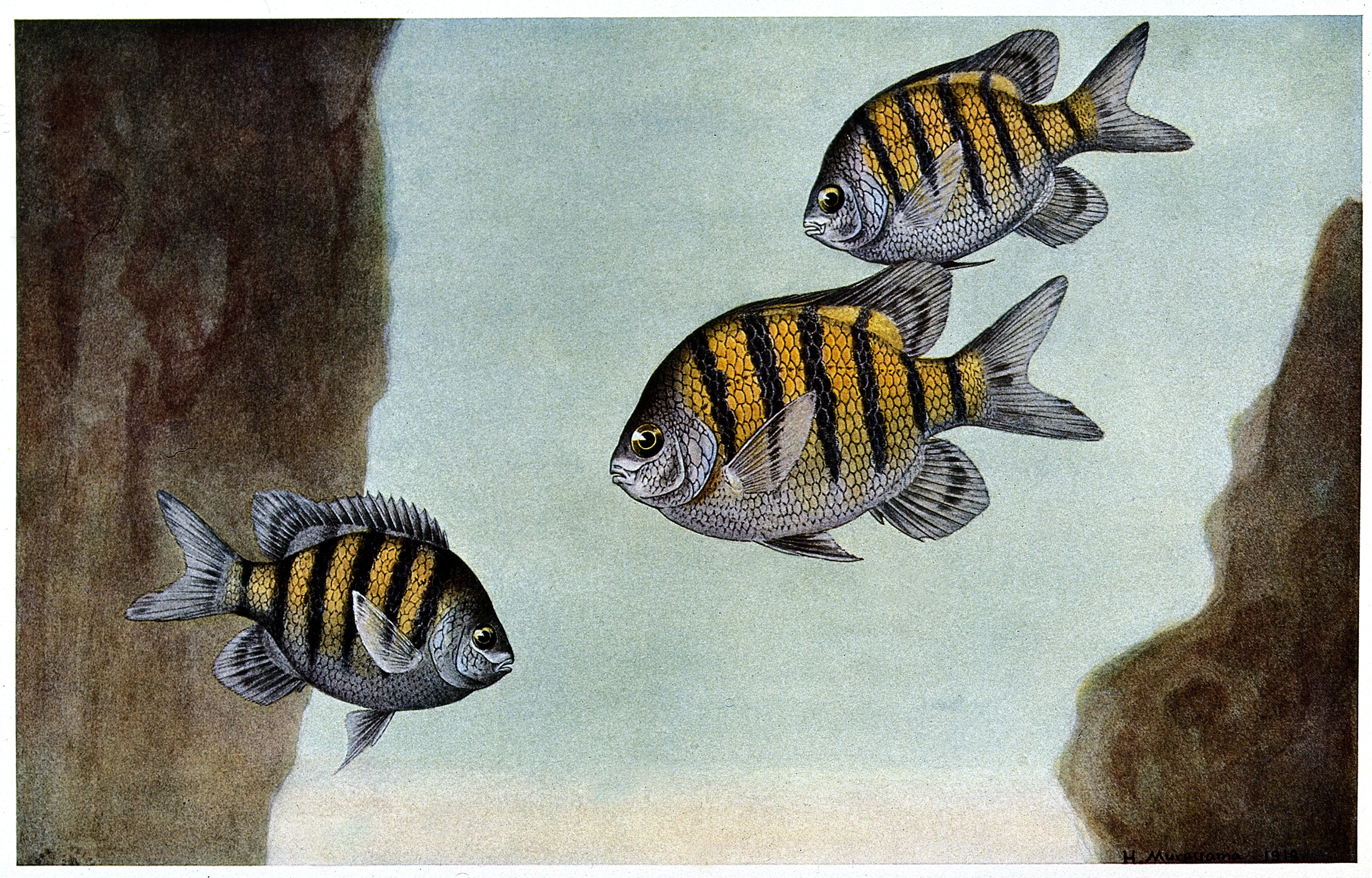
Three fish at the bottom of the sea

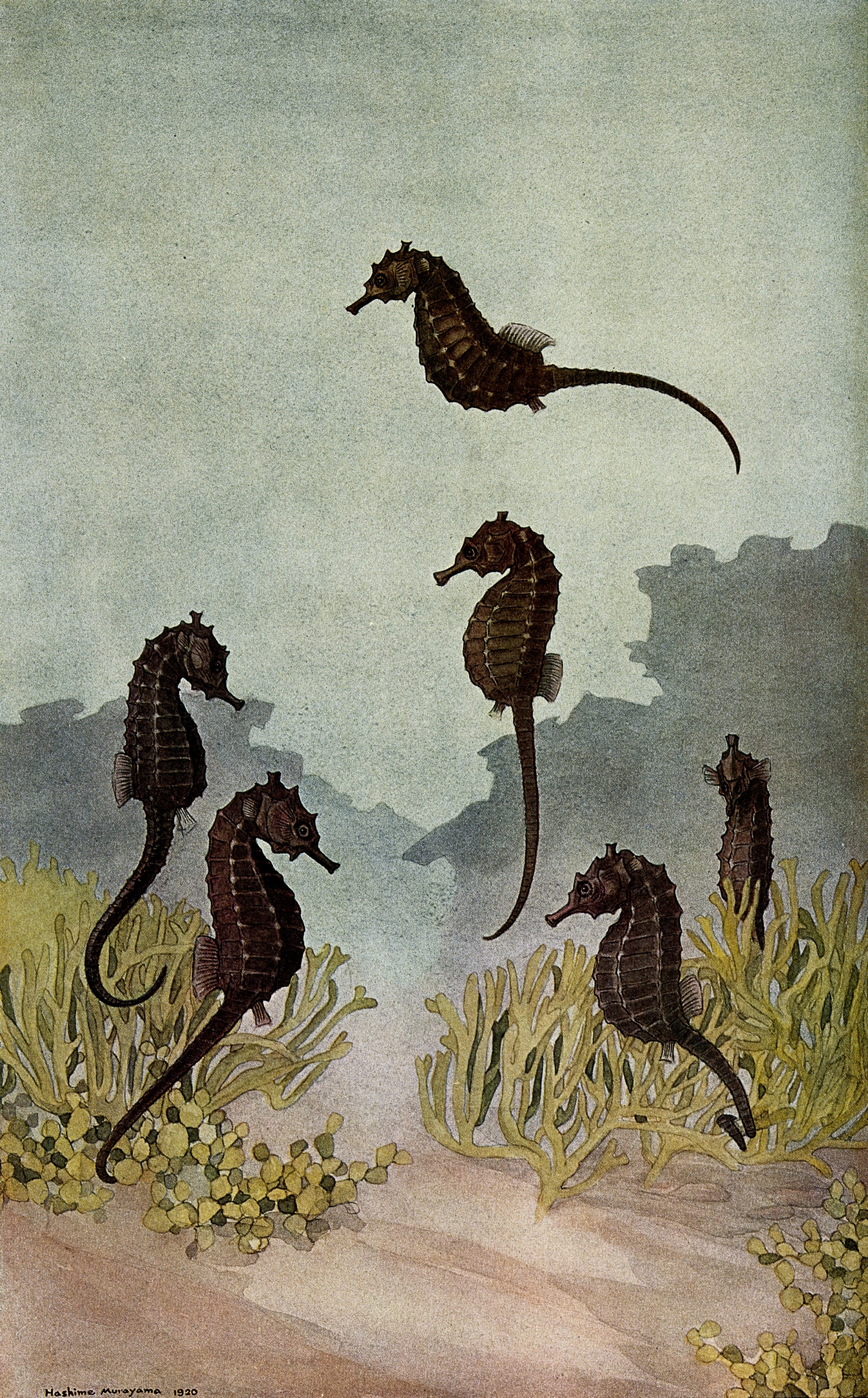
Six seahorses in the sea

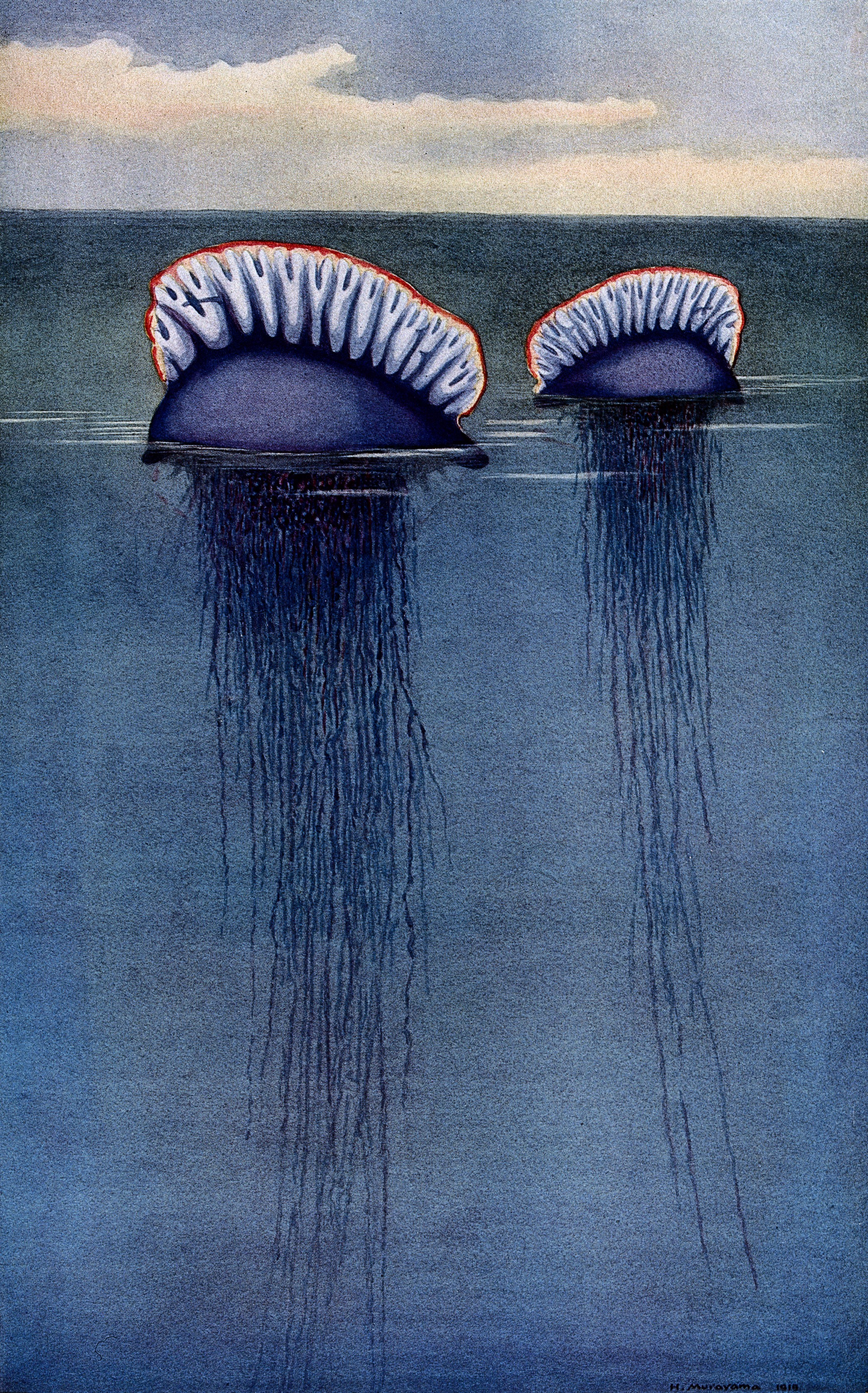
Two Portuguese men of war

In 1921, the National Geographic Society hired Murayama. As an artist at National Geographic, he paid meticulous attention to his drawings, adding his distinct style to them and making them instantly popular. He painted fish, which were his personal favorite, frogs, spiders, ants, honeybees, wasps, and butterflies. To get sources from which to study, he kept bug specimens in a jar and visited aquariums to look at frogs, trout, and salmon. The 1926 Washington, D.C. directory shows that “Hashime Murayama, artist” was the owner of a new house at 2436 37th Street, NW, in the brand-new neighborhood called Glover Park.

After a career of over twenty years as an artist at National Geographic, Murayama left (or was fired) in September 1941 because he was an immigrant. At this time, Japan-United States relations were about to be severed due to the attack on Pearl Harbor. Murayama was replaced as staff artist by Walter A. Weber, whose artwork was stated to be superior to Murayama's.

Murayama was offered work at Cornell University by Georgios Papanikolaou. Papanicolaou was studying cancer cells, and needed illustrations of cancer cells to train other doctors to identify diseased cells for cancer screening. Murayama used a camera lucida to project an image of the cells under the microscope onto paper. It was essential for Murayama to identify key examples in the groups of cells that could best illustrate the differences between healthy and cancerous cells, and then to accurately reproduce the structures and add the colors of the dyes. To draw fine structures such as cilia, he sometimes used a brush with a single bristle. In 1943, Murayama's illustrations of cervical cells were published in a book by Papanicolaou, describing what became known as the Pap smear, to detect cervical cancer.

During the war, Murayama was watched closely. His Washington house, which he had signed over to one of his sons (a United States citizen), was searched by agents seeking signs of espionage. The Alien Enemy Hearing Board had him arrested twice, in 1942 and 1943. Murayama was detained for five months on Ellis Island. Papanicolaou appealed to the board, on the grounds that Murayama was doing essential, potentially life-saving work that no one else could do. He gained the support of U.S. attorney general Francis Biddle, who arranged for Murayama to be freed.

In 1952, Murayama’s original watercolor paintings were used as models by diagnosticians in the largest screening trial to be sponsored by the National Cancer Institute, involving nearly 150,000 women. The use of Pap smears as a cancer screening tool decreased the mortality rate from cervical cancer by 70%.

Murayama continued to study cancer cells at Cornell University until his death in 1954. He was survived by his wife and two children. In 1966 his widow, Nao, became an American citizen.

A May 2019 Google doodle of Georgios Papanikolaou shows him holding one of the illustrations of cancer cells drawn by Hashime Murayama. Murayama' efforts in the fight against cervical cancer, along with that of Papanikolaou and his wife Andromachi and Helen Octavia Dickens, are featured in the documentary film The Cancer Detectives which first aired on American Experience on March 26, 2024.
