= Virginia M. Alexander =

American physician (1899-1949

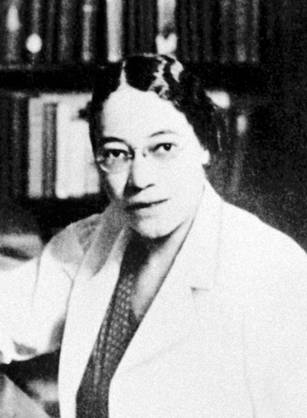
- Born: Virginia Margaret Alexander; February 4, 1899; Philadelphia, Pennsylvania
- Died: July 24, 1949 (aged 50); Philadelphia, Pennsylvania
- Education: Woman's Medical College of Pennsylvania
- Known for: Founding the Aspiranto Health Home in Philadelphia
- Scientific career
- Fields: Obstetrics and gynecology

Virginia Margaret Alexander (February 4, 1899 – July 24, 1949) was an American physician, public health researcher, and the founder of the Aspiranto Health Home in Philadelphia, Pennsylvania.

== Early life ==
Born the fourth of five children in Philadelphia to Hilliard and Virginia (Pace) Alexander, who were both born into slavery in the U.S., Virginia Alexander's mother died when she was 4 years old. At age 13, her father's riding academy closed. She withdrew from school to help relieve the resulting economic strain on her family, but her father insisted that she finish her education. Her siblings included prominent attorney Raymond Pace Alexander.

== Education ==
Alexander attended high school at the William Penn High School for Girls, where she graduated with honors before receiving a scholarship that allowed her to attend the University of Pennsylvania to complete her undergraduate education. Alexander took work as a waitress, clerk, and maid in order to cover her living expenses through college. She was also a member of the black sorority Delta Sigma Theta. She continued her medical education at the Woman's Medical College of Pennsylvania. In a school-wide medical aptitude test, Alexander earned the second-highest score, which was higher than the score earned by the school's own dean. An article published in The Crisis years later alleged that the Woman's Medical College of Pennsylvania was hostile toward students of color and that it was extremely difficult to get through the program at all because of the acts of racism that took place there. With the help of private philanthropy and by working jobs as a clerk, maid, and waitress, Alexander graduated medical school in good standing in 1925.

During the 1910s and 20s, aspiring physicians were usually required by law to complete a clinical internship in order to take the state licensing exam and be able to practice medicine. Nonetheless, when Alexander began looking for a medical internship, she faced rejection from many Philadelphia hospitals on the basis of race. For example, the president of one of the hospitals that rejected her stated, "If you were first among a thousand applicants you would still not be admitted."

The hospital operated by the Woman's Medical College of Pennsylvania would also not accept her, but the school did help Alexander and another student, Mae McCarroll, secure internships at the Kansas City Colored Hospital in Missouri in 1925. Alexander and McCarroll were the first two women members at the hospital because before them, the rules prohibited women from interning. Alexander remained in Kansas City to complete a pediatrics-surgery residency at Wheatley-Provident Hospital.

== Career ==
In 1927, Alexander returned to Philadelphia. She was passionate about public health but pursued clinical practice out of financial necessity.

=== Aspiranto Health Home ===
Alexander founded the Aspiranto Health Home in her renovated house in 1930. The two purposes of the creation of the practice were to provide healthcare to those who needed it but were otherwise not getting it, and to be able to provide care in a manner that was unconventional at the time. Aspiranto provided "socialized" health services to African American community members in North Philadelphia. Her work in private practice helped to fund Alexander's charitable medical care. Services provided by Aspiranto, often free of cost, included general medical care, obstetric care, and emergency medical care. Since the majority of her clients were low-income, Alexander made less money than white men in the same area who were able to make a lot more. Alexander's colleague Helen Octavia Dickens was also an active practitioner at the house.

=== Community involvement and activism ===
Alexander was active in a variety of different social, professional, and academic organizations. She practiced medicine at Frederick Douglass Memorial Hospital and Nurses' Training School, the Hospital of Woman's Medical College of Pennsylvania, Pennsylvania Hospital, and performed administrative work at Convalescent Hospital. In 1931, Alexander officially became a Quaker. She would go on to use her position in white Quaker circles to push the cause of improved public health practice for African American patients.

In her community, Alexander was active on the board of Wharton Settlement, the Young Women's Christian Association, the Women's International League for Peace and Freedom, and the Religious Society of Friends, where she was active in the Race Relations Committee, the Institute of Race Relations, and the Young Friends Movement.

Alexander brought social and economic determinants of health to the attention of her white peers, who had not previously considered them to disproportionately impact Black Americans. She began formal study of public health disparities for black and white patients in Philadelphia in 1935 as part of her involvement with the Institute of Race Relations (see "Publications"). Alexander observed disparate conditions for Black patients such as a lack of recreation facilities, racist treatment at hospitals, and the exclusion of Black physicians from working in hospitals. Alexander also recorded disparities in health outcomes: she found that Black babies died at over twice the rate of white babies, and Black patients died of tuberculosis at over six times the rate of white patients. During this time period, Alexander received funding from the Rosenwald Foundation, which she used to found the North Philadelphia Clinical Centre.

During World War II, Alexander volunteered as a public health physician in Birmingham, Alabama, through the US Department of Health, where the majority of her patients were iron and coal miners. She also worked as an Ob-Gyn at the Woman's Medical College Hospital, Mercy Hospital, and Pennsylvania Hospital. Eventually, Alexander would go on to teach at the Woman's Medical College of Pennsylvania and work as the Physician-in-Charge of Women Students at Howard University.

=== Public health career ===
The field of public health gained popularity in the years leading up to World War II, and Alexander was one of the first people to acquire a master's degree in public health. Alexander was admitted to Yale University in 1936 to study public health, where she earned her degree in 1937. Shortly after leaving Yale, she accepted a position at Howard University as an assistant university physician for women students.

Alexander worked with the US Public Health Service from 1943 to 1945 at the Slossfield Clinic located in Birmingham, Alabama. Afterwards, she returned to Philadelphia where she resumed her medical practice in addition to working with local Quakers on race relations.

== Personal life and death ==
Alexander lived with her father in North Philadelphia for most of her life. Alexander never married or had children but reportedly did have an extramarital relationship with W.E.B. DuBois, who was an editor at The Crisis at the time and possibly wrote the article that featured her.

Alexander died on July 24, 1949, aged 50, in her native Philadelphia after years battling lupus. She was buried in Sharon Hill, Pennsylvania, at Mount Lawn Cemetery.

== Publications ==
- The Social, Economic, and Health Problems of North Philadelphia Negroes and Their Relationship to a Proposed Interracial Public Health Demonstration Center, 1935.
- Negro Hospitalization, 1937.
- The Health Status and Needs of the Negro Adolescent, 1940.
- The Health Status of Negro Workers in the National Youth Administration in the District of Columbia, 1941.
