= Earwax =

Waxy substance secreted by the ear

- Other names: Cerumen
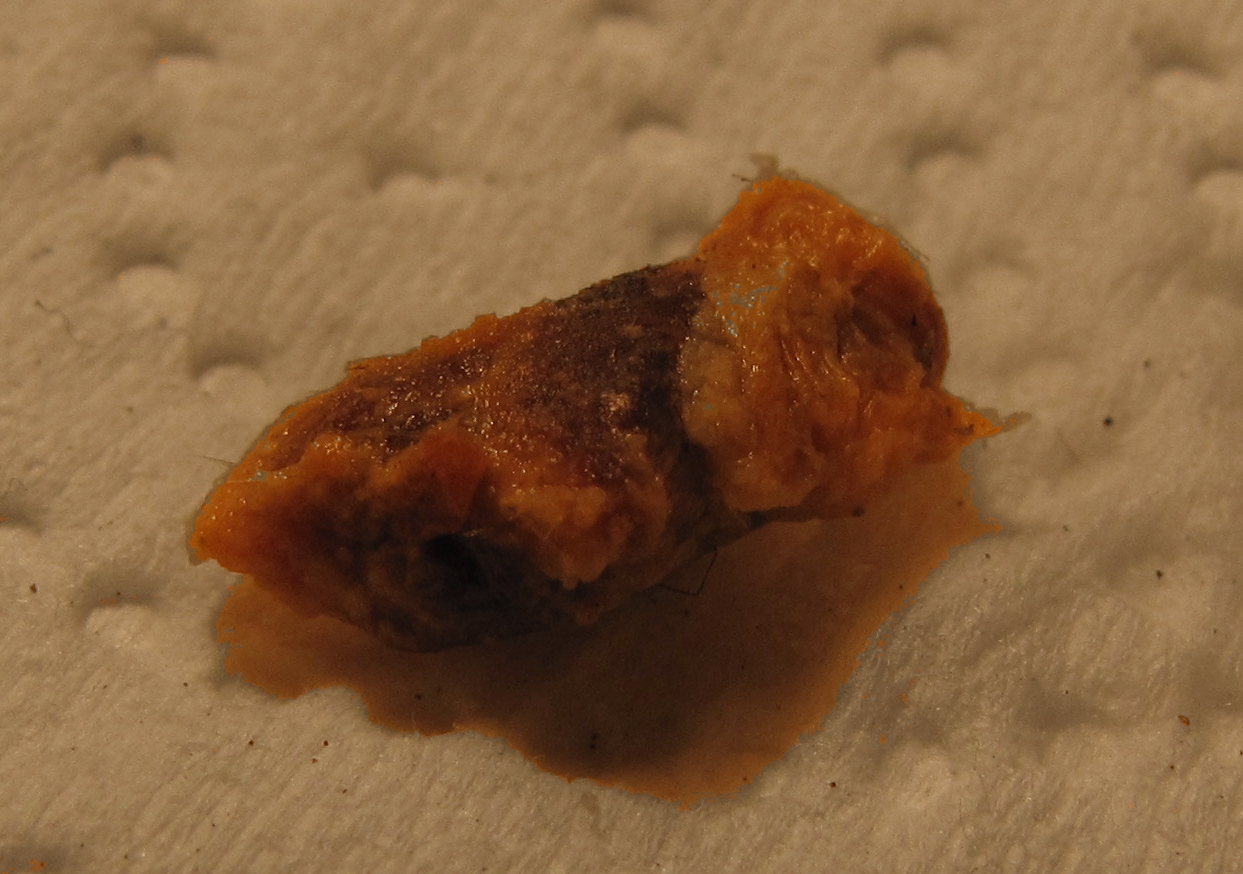
- Wet-type human earwax
- Pronunciation: Cerumen /səˈruːmɛn/
- Specialty: Otorhinolaryngology
- Prognosis: Prevalence

Earwax, also known by the medical term cerumen, is a waxy substance secreted in the ear canal of humans and other mammals. Earwax can be many colors, including brown, orange, red, yellowish, and gray. Earwax protects the skin of the human ear canal, assists in cleaning and lubrication, and provides protection against bacteria, fungi, particulate matter, and water.

Major components of earwax include cerumen, produced by a type of modified sweat gland, and sebum, an oily substance. Both components are made by glands located in the outer ear canal. The chemical composition of earwax includes saturated and unsaturated long chain fatty acids, alcohols, squalene, and cholesterol. Earwax also contains dead skin cells and hair.

Excess or compacted cerumen is the buildup of earwax causing a blockage in the ear canal and it can press against the eardrum or block the outside ear canal or hearing aids, potentially causing hearing loss.

== Physiology ==
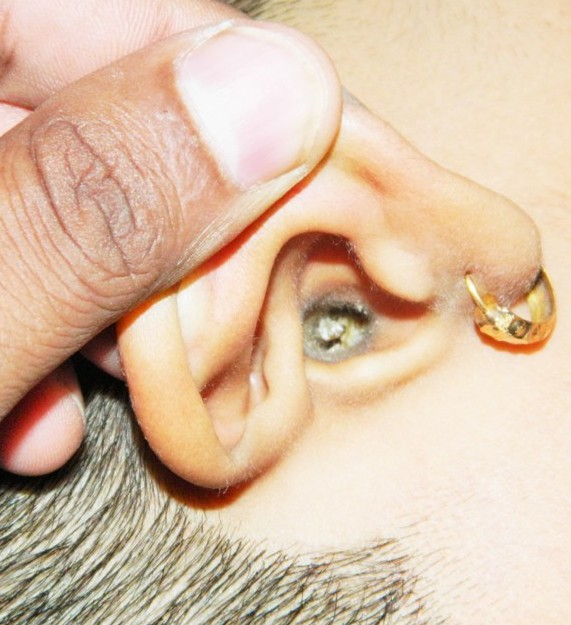
Earwax in ear

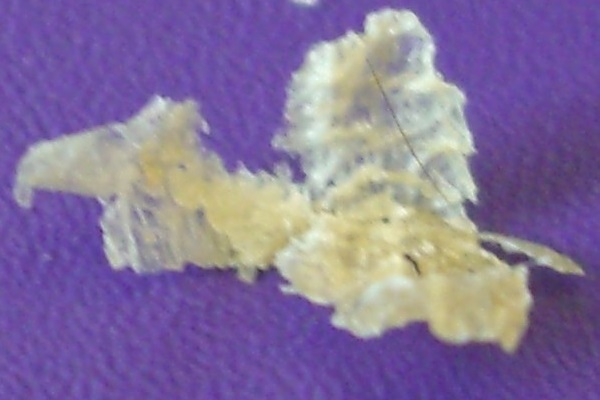
Dry-type human earwax

World map of the distribution of the A allele of the single nucleotide polymorphism rs17822931 in the ABCC11 gene associated with dry-type earwax. The proportion of A alleles (dry-type earwax) in each population is represented by the white area in each circle.

Cerumen is produced in the cartilaginous outer third portion of the ear canal. It is a mixture of secretions from sebaceous glands and less-viscous ones from modified apocrine sweat glands. The primary components of both wet and dry earwax are shed layers of skin, with, on average, 60% of the earwax consisting of keratin, 12–20% saturated and unsaturated long-chain fatty acids, alcohols, squalene and 6–9% cholesterol.

=== Wet or dry ===
There are two genetically-determined types of earwax: the wet type, which is dominant, and the dry type, which is recessive. This distinction is caused by a single base change in the "ATP-binding cassette C11 gene". Dry-type individuals are homozygous for adenine (AA) whereas wet-type requires at least one guanine (AG or GG). Dry earwax is gray or tan and brittle, and is about 20% lipid. It has a smaller concentration of lipid and pigment granules than wet earwax. Wet earwax is light brown or dark brown and has a viscous and sticky consistency, and is about 50% lipid. Wet-type earwax is associated with armpit odor, which is increased by sweat production.

Some East Asians (including Yamato Japanese), Southeast Asians and Native Americans (including Inuit) are more likely to have the dry type of earwax (gray and flaky), while Africans, Europeans, and other East Asians (including Ainu) are more likely to have wet type earwax (honey-brown, dark orange to dark-brown and moist). 30–50% of South Asians, Central Asians, Pacific Islanders and West Asians have the dry type of cerumen.

=== Cleaning ===
Cleaning of the ear canal occurs as a result of the "conveyor belt" process of epithelial migration, aided by jaw movement. From the umbo, cells formed in the center of the tympanic membrane move to the walls of the ear canal, and then towards the entrance of the ear canal. The cerumen in the ear canal is also carried outwards, taking with it particulate matter that may have gathered in the canal. Jaw movement dislodges debris from the walls of the ear canal to assist in this process.

Removing earwax is in the scope of practice for nurses, audiologists, Family Medicine physicians, and otorhinolaryngologists (ear, nose, and throat doctors).

=== Lubrication ===
The lubrication provided by cerumen prevents drying of the skin within the ear canal. The high lipid content of the sebum produced by the sebaceous glands causes the cerumen to work like lubrication. In wet-type cerumen, these lipids include cholesterol, squalene, and many long-chain fatty acids and alcohols.

=== Antimicrobial effects ===
While studies conducted up until the 1960s found little evidence supporting antibacterial activity for cerumen, more recent studies have found that cerumen has a bactericidal effect on some strains of bacteria. Cerumen has been found to reduce the viability of a wide range of bacteria, including Haemophilus influenzae, Staphylococcus aureus, and many variants of Escherichia coli, sometimes by as much as 99%. The growth of two fungi commonly present in otomycosis was also significantly inhibited by human cerumen. These antimicrobial properties are due principally to the presence of saturated fatty acids, lysozyme and, especially, to the slight acidity of cerumen (pH typically around 6.1 in average individuals). Conversely, other research has found that cerumen can support microbial growth and some cerumen samples were found to have bacterial counts as high as 10^{7}/g cerumen. The bacteria were predominantly commensals.

== Excess earwax (impacted cerumen) ==
Earwax helps protect the ear by trapping dust and other foreign particles that could filter through and damage the eardrum. Normally, earwax moves toward the opening of the ear and falls out or is washed away, but sometimes excessive earwax can gather and become hard to remove. This is referred to as excessive earwax or impacted cerumen.

Excessive earwax may impede the passage of sound in the ear canal, causing mild conductive hearing loss, pain in the ear, itchiness, or dizziness. Untreated impacted wax can result in hearing loss. People with impacted wax may also present with perforated eardrums; this is usually induced by putting objects in the ear in an attempt to remove the wax. A physical exam usually checks for visibility of the tympanic membrane, which can be blocked by excessive cerumen.

Impacted cerumen may improve on its own, but treatment by a doctor is generally safe and effective. Hearing usually returns completely after the impacted earwax is removed.

Hearing aids may be associated with increased earwax impaction by blocking earwax from leaving the ear canal. Earwax can also get into a hearing aid's vents and receivers, and degrade the components inside the hearing aid due to its acidity. Earwax is estimated to be the cause of 60–80% of hearing aid faults. Excessive earwax can also cause tinnitus, a constant ringing in the ears, ear fullness, hearing loss and ear pain.

Impacted earwax is more common in those with Down's syndrome, due to the smaller, curved shape of the ear canal.

=== Treatment ===
Movement of the jaw helps the ears' natural cleaning process. The American Academy of Otolaryngology discourages earwax removal, unless the excess earwax is symptomatic.

While a number of methods of earwax removal are effective, their comparative merits have not been determined. A number of softeners are effective; however, if this is not sufficient, the most common method of cerumen removal is syringing with warm water. A curette method is more likely to be used by audiologists and otolaryngologists when the ear canal is partially occluded and the material is not adhering to the skin of the ear canal, but due to the high skill level needed to not damage the eardrum, is limited. Cotton swabs are not recommended as they push most of the earwax farther into the ear canal and remove only a small portion of the top layer of wax that happens to adhere to the fibers of the swab.

==== Softeners ====
This process is referred to as cerumenolysis. Topical preparations for the removal of earwax may be better than no treatment, and there may not be much difference between types, including water and olive oil. However, there were not enough studies to draw firm conclusions, and the evidence on irrigation and manual removal is equivocal.

Commercially or commonly available cerumenolytics include:

- Any of a number of types of oil
- Urea hydrogen peroxide (6.5%) and glycerine
- A solution of sodium bicarbonate in water, or sodium bicarbonate B.P.C. (sodium bicarbonate and glycerine)
- Cerumol (peanut oil, turpentine and dichlorobenzene)
- Cerumenex (triethanolamine, polypeptides and oleate-condensate)
- Docusate, an emulsifying agent, an active ingredient found in laxatives
- Mineral oil

A cerumenolytic should be used 2–3 times daily for 3–5 days prior to the cerumen extraction.

==== Microsuction ====
Microsuction involves the use of a vacuum suction probe to break up and extract impacted cerumen. Microsuction can be preferred over other methods as it avoids the presence of moisture in the ear, is often faster than irrigation, and is performed with direct vision of the earwax being removed. Typically, a camera with lights and guide hole is utilised, with a long metal vacuum probe being inserted into the guide hole; the practitioner is then able to see inside the ear and remove earwax under pressure. Potential adverse effects include dizziness, temporary tinnitus, and reduced hearing due to volume of the pump and the proximity of the vacuum probe to the ear drum; the frequency of these is reduced where the cerumen is softened in the five days preceding microsuction. In general, microsuction is well tolerated and even preferred by many patients.

==== Ear irrigation ====
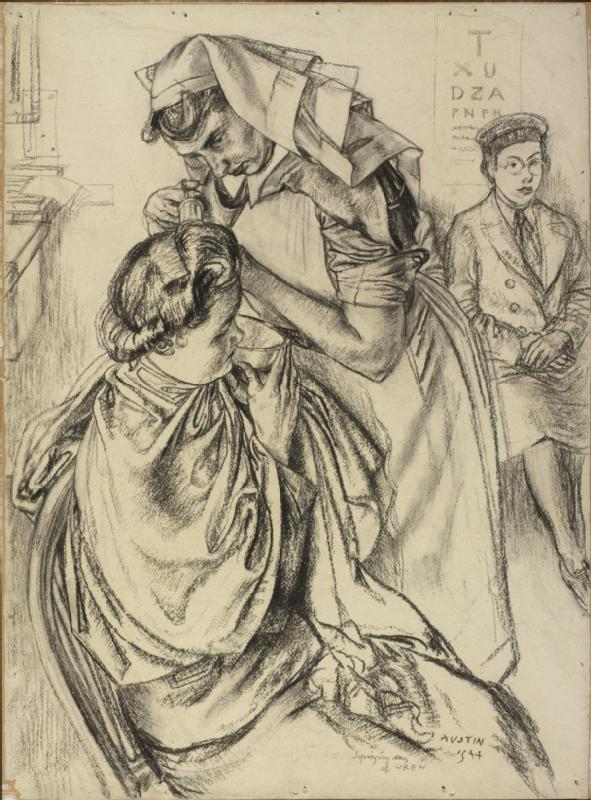
A patient undergoing ear syringing, 1944

Once the cerumen has been softened, it may be removed from the ear canal by irrigation, but the evidence on this practice is ambiguous. If a patient has a perforated eardrum, syringing can force infections into the middle ear, and residual water can cause an infection in the outer ear.

This may be effectively accomplished with a spray type ear washer, commonly used in the medical setting or at home, with a bulb syringe. Ear syringing techniques are described in great detail by Wilson & Roeser and Blake et al. who advise pulling the external ear up and back, and aiming the nozzle of the syringe slightly upwards and backwards so that the water flows as a cascade along the roof of the canal. The irrigation solution flows out of the canal along its floor, taking wax and debris with it. The solution used to irrigate the ear canal is usually warm water, normal saline, sodium bicarbonate solution, or a solution of water and vinegar to help prevent secondary infection.

Affected people generally prefer the irrigation solution to be warmed to body temperature, as dizziness is a common side effect of ear washing or syringing with fluids that are colder or warmer than body temperature.

==== Mechanical removal using a curette or cotton swabs ====
Earwax can be removed with an ear pick or curette, which physically dislodges the earwax and scoops it out of the ear canal. In the West, use of ear picks is usually only done by health professionals. Curetting earwax using an ear pick was common in ancient Europe and is still practised in East Asia. Since the earwax of most Asians is of the dry type, it is extremely easily removed by light scraping with an ear pick, as it simply falls out in large pieces or dry flakes.

In the late 2010s, battery-operated 'smart' curette earwax removal devices were introduced to the commercial personal grooming market. These endoscope-like devices are roughly the size and shape of a thick ballpoint pen, combining a miniature digital video camera, LED light source, Wi-Fi connectivity, and various earwax removal attachments. Patients could then connect this electronic curette device to a mobile app on their smartphone and view a real-time video feed of the curette in the ear canal. With practice and careful technique, the device enables patients to inspect their own ear canals and remove excess earwax while also visualizing the tympanic membrane. However, concerns remain regarding the risks of accidentally breaking the delicate skin within the ear canal or perforating the eardrum.

It is generally advised not to use cotton swabs (Q-Tips or cotton buds), as doing so will likely push the wax farther down the ear canal, and if used carelessly, perforate the eardrum. Abrasion of the ear canal, particularly after water has entered from swimming or bathing, can lead to ear infection. Also, the cotton head may fall off and become lodged in the ear canal. Therefore, cotton swabs should be used only to clean the external ear.

==== Ear candles ====
Ear candling is a dangerous, ineffective, and counterproductive alternative medicine practice that involves lighting a hollow candle and placing the unlit end in the ear canal. Advocates say that the dark residue appearing on the candle after the procedure consists of extracted earwax, but studies show that the same dark residue is left regardless of whether the candle is inserted into an ear, as the residue is derived from the candle itself and not the ear. The American Academy of Otolaryngology states that ear candles are not a safe option for removing ear wax, and that no controlled studies or scientific evidence support their use for ear wax removal. Survey responses from medical specialists (otolaryngologists) in the United Kingdom reported ear injuries including burns, ear canal occlusions and ear drum perforations and secondary ear canal infections with temporary hearing loss from ear candling. The Food and Drug Administration has taken several regulatory actions against the sale and distribution of ear candles since 1996, including seizing ear candle products and ordering injunctions, and ear candles are now marked as "providing no health benefit".

==== Ear vacuuming ====
Home "ear vacs" were ineffective at removing ear-wax when compared to a Jobson-Horne probe.

==== Potential complications ====
A postal survey of British general practitioners in 1990 found that only 19% always performed cerumen removal themselves. It is problematic as the removal of cerumen is not without risk, and physicians and nurses often have inadequate training for removal. Irrigation can be performed at home with proper equipment as long as the person is careful not to irrigate too hard. All other methods should be carried out only by individuals who have been sufficiently trained in the procedure.

The author Bull advised physicians: "After removal of wax, inspect thoroughly to make sure none remains. This advice might seem superfluous, but is frequently ignored." This was confirmed by Sharp et al., who, in a survey of 320 general practitioners, found that only 68% of doctors inspected the ear canal after syringing to check that the wax was removed. As a result, failure to remove the wax from the canal made up approximately 30% of the complications associated with the procedure. Other complications included otitis externa (swimmer's ear), which involves inflammation or bacterial infection of the external acoustic meatus, as well as pain, vertigo, tinnitus, and perforation of the ear drum. Based on this study, a rate of major complications in 1/1000 ears syringed was suggested.

Claims arising from ear syringing mishaps account for about 25% of the total claims received by New Zealand's Accident Compensation Corporation ENT Medical Misadventure Committee. While high, this is not surprising, as ear syringing is an extremely common procedure. Grossan suggested that approximately 150,000 ears are irrigated each week in the United States, and about 40,000 per week in the United Kingdom. Extrapolating from data obtained in Edinburgh, Sharp et al. place this figure much higher, estimating that approximately 7,000 ears are syringed per 100,000 population per annum. In the New Zealand claims mentioned above, perforation of the tympanic membrane was by far the most common injury resulting in significant disability.

=== Prevalence ===
The prevalence of impacted earwax is different across the world.

In the United Kingdom, 2–6% of the population have cerumen that is impacted. In America, 3.6% of emergency visits caused by ear issues were due to impacted cerumen. In Brazil, 8.4–13.7% of the population have impacted cerumen.

== History ==
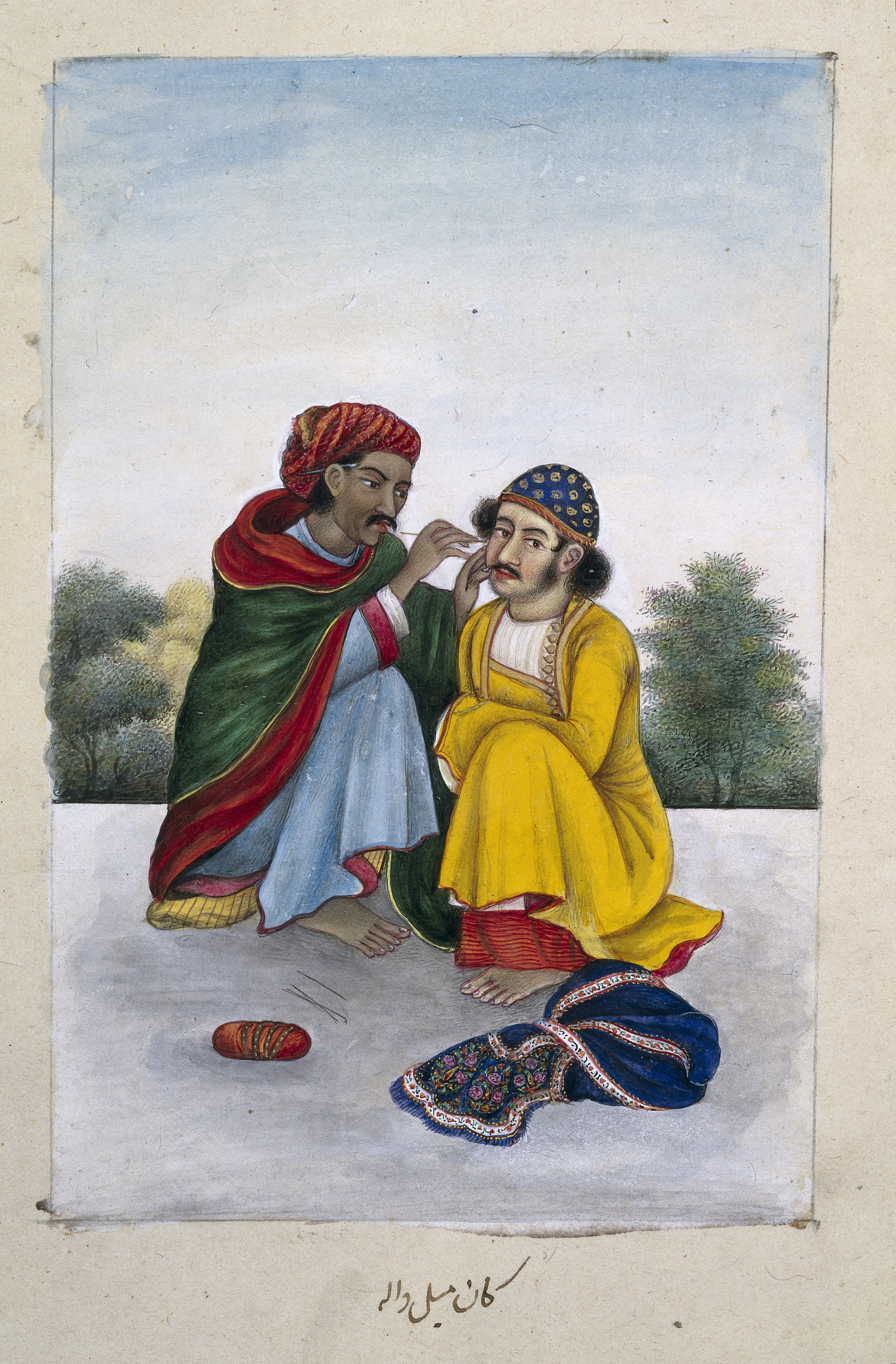
An ear-cleaner, attending to a man's ear. Gouache painting, India, 1825.

The treatment of excess ear wax was described by Aulus Cornelius Celsus in De Medicina in the 1st century:

When a man is becoming dull of hearing, which happens most often after prolonged headaches, in the first place, the ear itself should be inspected: for there will be found either a crust such as comes upon the surface of ulcerations, or concretions of wax. If a crust, hot oil is poured in, or verdigris mixed with honey or leek juice or a little soda in honey wine. And when the crust has been separated from the ulceration, the ear is irrigated with tepid water, to make it easier for the crusts now disengaged to be withdrawn by the ear scoop. If it is wax, and if it is soft, it can be extracted in the same way by the ear scoop; but if hard, vinegar containing a little soda is introduced; and when the wax has softened, the ear is washed out and cleared as above. ... Further, the ear should be syringed with castoreum mixed with vinegar and laurel oil and the juice of young radish rind, or with cucumber juice, mixed with crushed rose leaves. The dropping in of the juice of unripe grapes mixed with rose oil is also fairly efficacious against deafness.

=== Uses ===
- In medieval Europe, earwax and other substances such as urine were used to prepare pigments used by scribes to illustrate illuminated manuscripts.
- Pliny the Elder, in his Natural History, wrote that earwax—when applied topically—cured bites from humans, scorpions, and serpents; it was said to work best when taken from the ears of the wounded person himself.
- Early American lip balms may have been based on earwax. The 1832 edition of the American Frugal Housewife said that "nothing was better than earwax to prevent the painful effects resulting from a wound by a nail [or] skewer"; and also recommended earwax as a remedy for cracked lips.
- Before waxed thread was commonly available, a seamstress would use her own earwax to stop the cut ends of threads from fraying.
- Earwax retains concentrations of cortisol over time. As cortisol levels change throughout the day and increase in response to stress, long-term measurements are difficult yet necessary. A 2020 study suggests swabbing earwax as a method of measuring long-term cortisol levels that is noninvasive and does not confound itself.
