= Cotton swab =

Personal care item

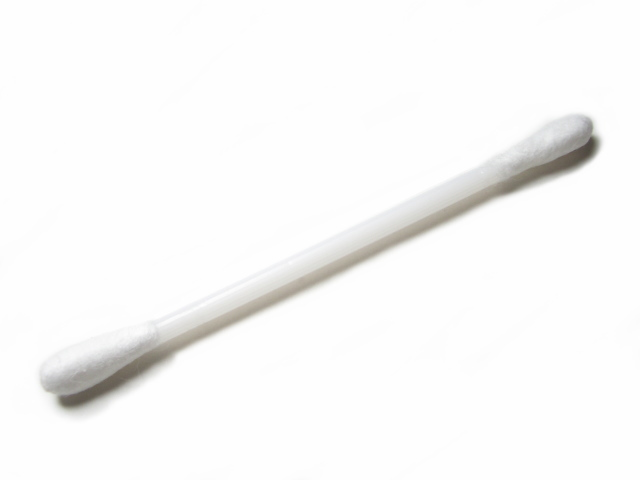
A cotton swab

Cotton swabs (American English) or cotton buds (British English), also Q-tips (proprietary eponym, American English), are wads of cotton wrapped around a short rod made of wood, rolled paper, or plastic. They are most commonly used for ear cleaning, although this is not recommended by physicians. Other uses for cotton swabs include first aid, cosmetics application, cleaning, infant care, and crafts. Some countries have banned the plastic-stemmed versions in favor of biodegradable alternatives over concerns about marine pollution.

== History ==
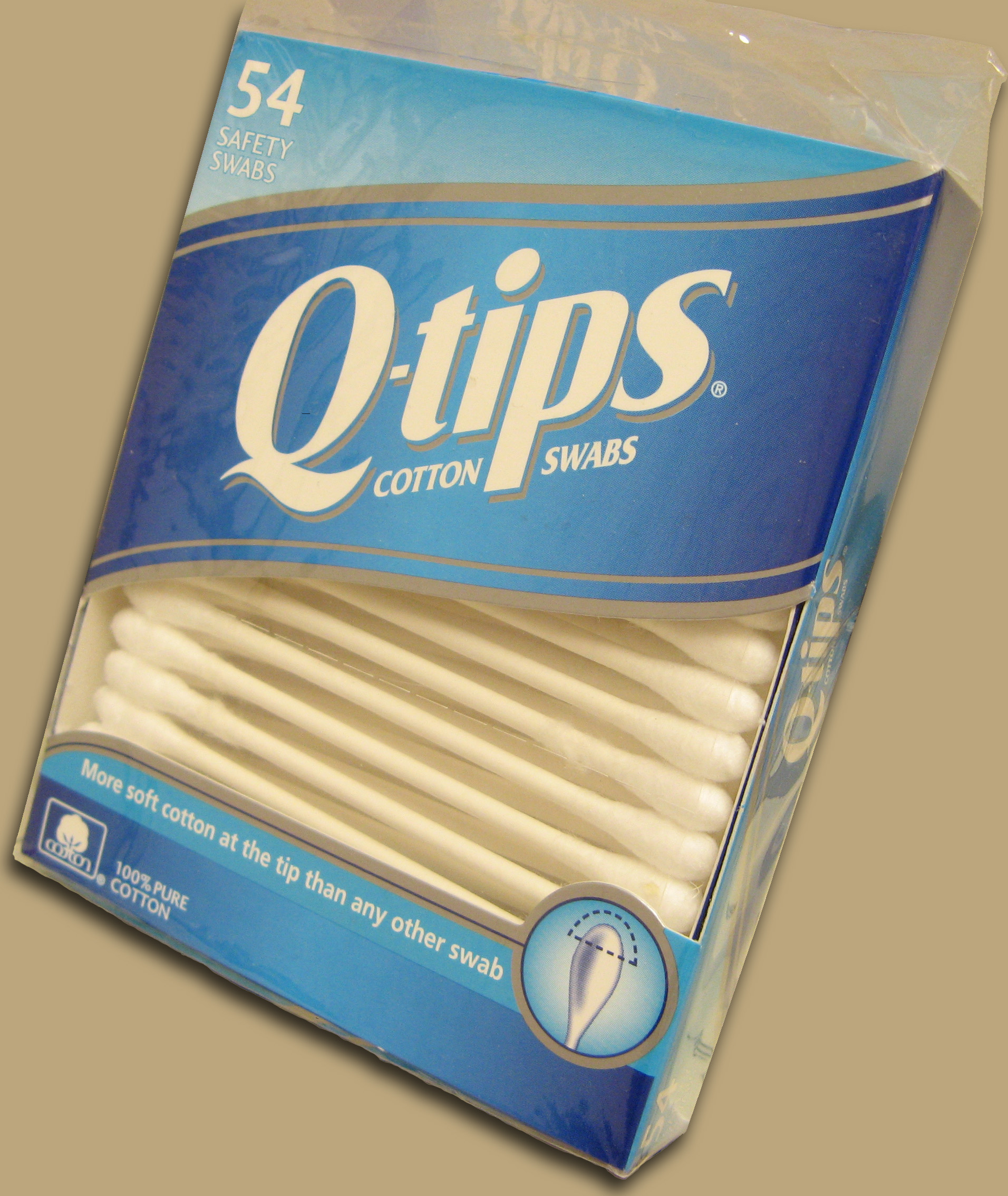
A pack of 54 Q-tips

The first mass-produced cotton swab was developed in 1923 by Polish-American Jew Leo Gerstenzang after he watched his wife attach wads of cotton to toothpicks to clean their infant's ears. His product was originally named "Baby Gays" in recognition of their being intended for infants before being renamed "Q-tips Baby Gays", with the "Q" standing for "quality". The product eventually became known as "Q-tips", which went on to become the most widely sold brand name of cotton swabs in North America. The term "Q-tip" is often used as a genericized trademark for a cotton swab in the United States and Canada. The Q-tips brand is owned by Evermark. It was formerly owned by Unilever and had over $200 million in US sales in 2014. "Johnson's buds" are made by Johnson & Johnson.

However, according to the United States Patent Case (C-10,415) Q-Tips, Inc. v. Johnson & Johnson, 108 F. Supp. 845 (D.N.J. 1952), it would appear that the first commercial producer of cotton-tipped applicators was Mrs. Hazel Tietjen Forbis, who manufactured them in her home. She also owned a patent on the article, numbered 1,652,108, dated 6 December 1927. In 1925, Leo Gerstenzang Co., Inc. purchased an assignment of the product patent from Mrs. Forbis. On 2 January 1937, Q-Tips, Inc's president, Mr. Leo Gerstenzang, and his wife Mrs. Ziuta Gerstenzang formed a partnership and purchased from Mrs. Forbis "All merchandise, machinery, and fixtures now contained in the premises at 132 W. 36th Street and used by said Q-Tips, Inc., for the manufacture of Q-Tips or medicated swabs together with the accounts receivable of said Q-Tips, Inc." The contract recited that Q-Tips, Inc. was the owner of patents covering the manufacture of applicators.

In 1925, when The Leo Gerstenzang Co., Inc. began manufacturing cotton swabs, the packages of applicators were labelled Baby-Gays. In 1926, the legend was changed to read "Q-Tips Baby Gays", and in 1927 an application was made to register the mark "Q-Tips Baby Gays". Sometime after 1926, the words "Baby Gays" were dropped and the concern began to develop "Q-Tips" as its identifying mark, applying for registration on 14 September 1933. Packages were made up using blue paper with pictures of double-tipped applicators upon them, features which have been the basis for the Q Tips packaged sign since. The design of the crossed applicators was made by dropping them and then photographing the resulting pattern.

== Description ==
The traditional cotton swab has a single tip on a wooden handle, and these are still often used, especially in medical settings. They are usually relatively long, about 10 cm (4 inches). These often are packaged sterile, one or two to a paper or plastic sleeve. The advantage of the paper sleeve and the wooden handle is that the package can be autoclaved to be sterilized (plastic sleeves or handles would melt in the autoclave).

Cotton swabs manufactured for home use are usually shorter, about 6.5 cm (2 1/2 inches) long, and double-tipped. The handles were first made of wood and then made of rolled paper, which is still the most common (although tubular plastic is also used). They are often sold in large quantities, 100 or more in a container.

Plastic swab stems exist in a wide variety of colors, such as blue, pink, or green. However, the cotton itself is traditionally white.

== Use ==
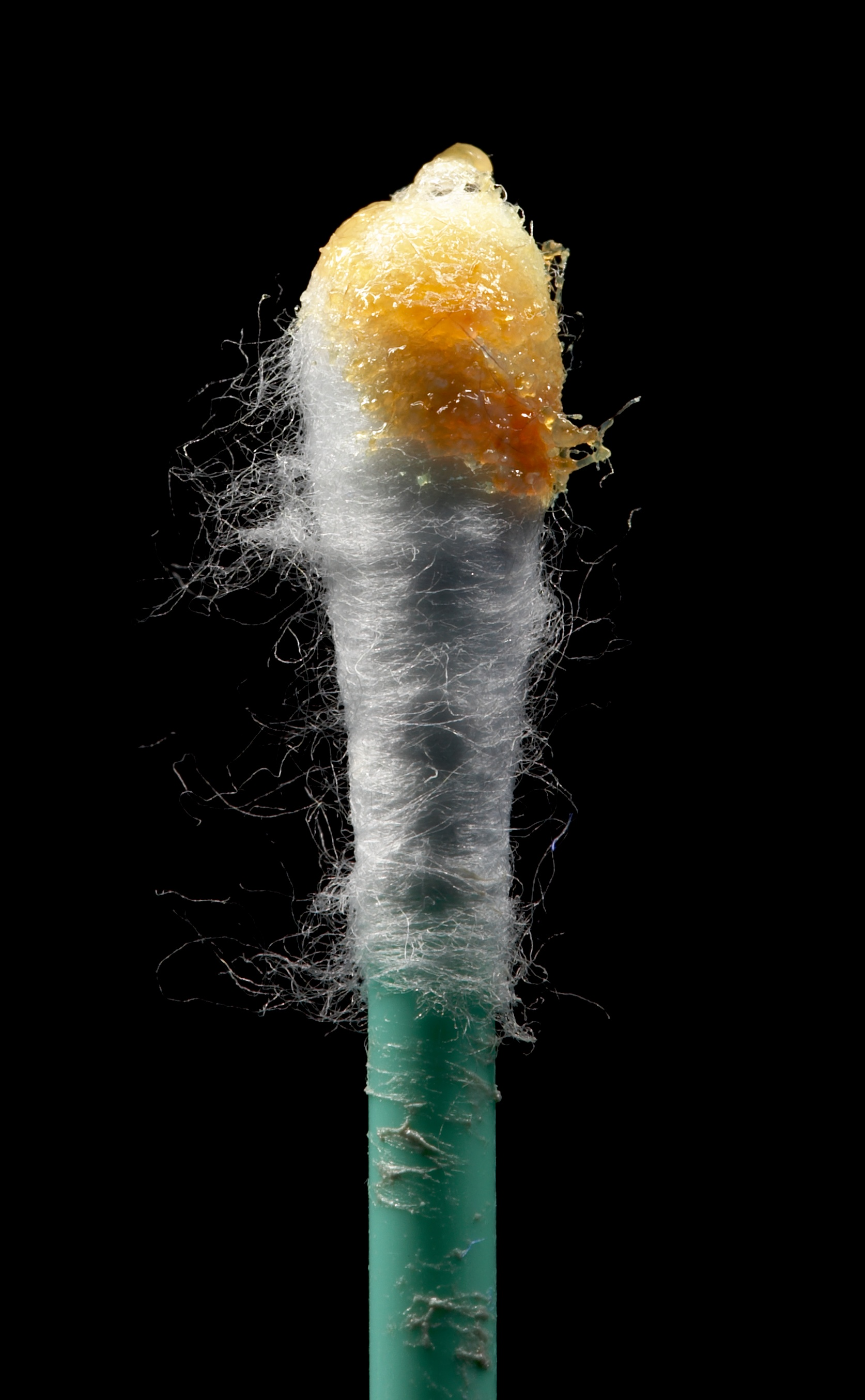
Wet-type earwax on a cotton swab

The most common use for cotton swabs is to clean the ear canal by removing earwax. This use is usually against manufacturer instructions. Cotton swabs are also commonly used for cosmetic purposes such as applying and removing makeup and touching up nail polish, as well as for household uses such as cleaning and arts and crafts.

Medical-type swabs are often used to take microbiological cultures. The swabs are rubbed onto or into the infected area, then wiped across the culture medium, such as an agar plate, where bacteria from the swab may grow. They are also used to take DNA samples, most commonly by scraping cells from the inner cheek in the case of humans. They can be used to apply medicines to a targeted area, to selectively remove substances from a targeted area, or to apply cleaning substances like Betadine. They are also used as applicators for cosmetics, ointments, and other substances.

A related area is the use of swabs for microbiological environmental monitoring. Once taken, the swab can be streaked onto an agar plate, or the contents of the tip removed by agitation or dilution into the broth. The broth can be filtered or incubated and examined for microbial growth.

Cotton swabs are also often used outside of the field of personal hygiene:

- They are often used in the construction of plastic model kits, for various applications during the application of decals or painting. Special brands of cotton swabs exist for this purpose, characterised by sturdier cotton heads and varied shapes of those heads.
- They can be used in the dyne test for measuring surface energy. This use is problematic, as manufacturers differ in the binders they use to fix the cotton to the stem, affecting the outcome of the test.
- They are frequently used for cleaning the laser diode lens of an optical drive in conjunction with rubbing alcohol. Similarly, they are used for cleaning larger computer parts such as video cards and fans. They were also widely used in the past to clean video game cartridges.

=== Role in medical diagnostics ===
The importance of swab technology in medical diagnostics is immense. Swabs are a primary tool for collecting patient specimens, vital for accurately detecting pathogens, DNA sampling, and disease diagnosis. The collection's precise nature and the swab's quality are critical in ensuring reliable test results.

Nasopharyngeal swabs for respiratory virus detection swabs for efficient DNA material collection swabs to assess the presence of microbial infection in sterility and prevention of contamination.

== Medical risks ==
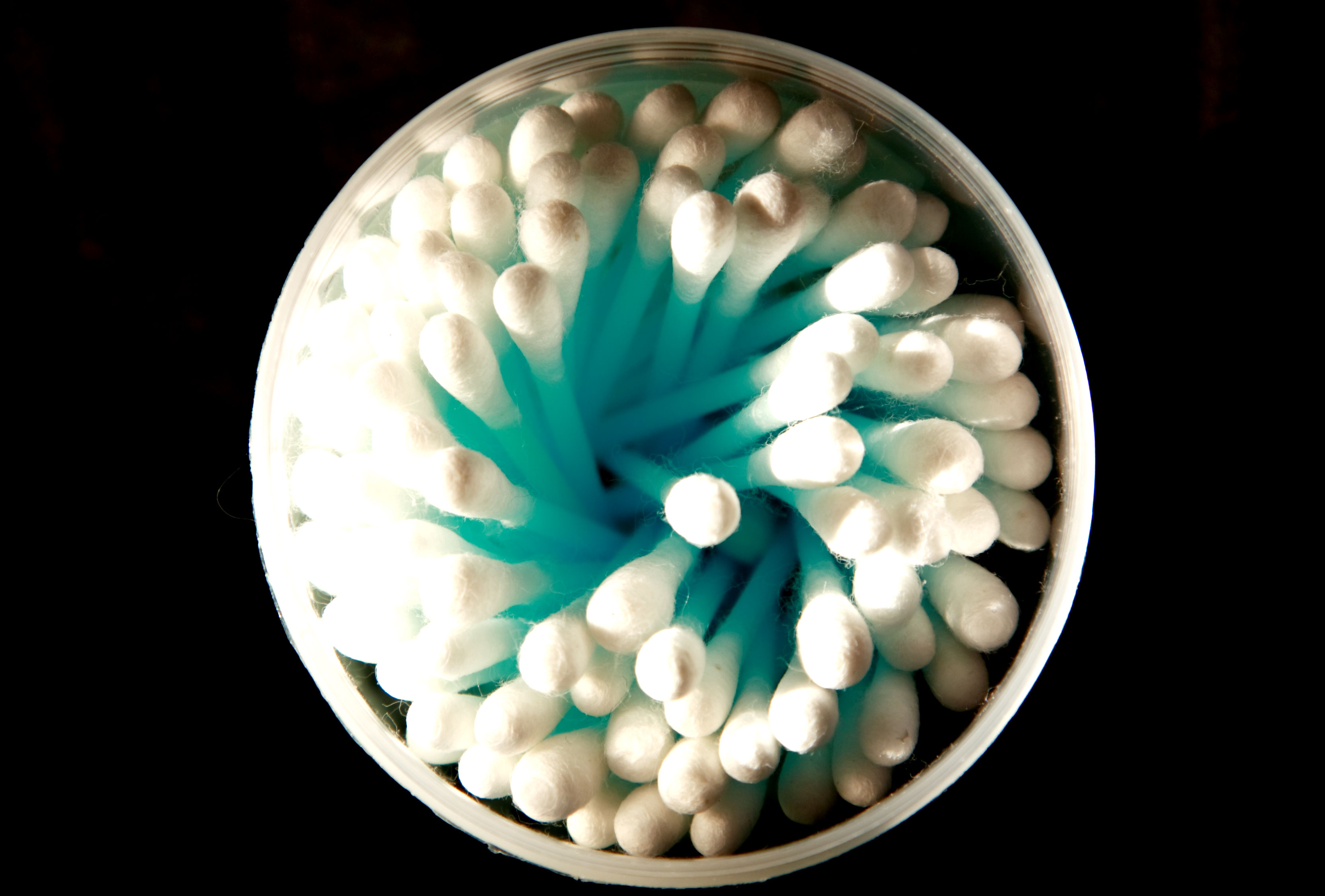
Cotton swabs in a round container

Using cotton swabs in the ear canal has no associated medical benefits and poses definite medical risks. Cerumen (ear wax) is a naturally occurring, normally extruded, product of the external auditory canal that protects the skin inside the ear, serves beneficial lubrication and cleaning functions, and provides some protection from bacteria, fungi, insects, and water.

Attempts to remove cerumen with cotton swabs may result in cerumen impaction, a buildup or blockage of cerumen in the ear canal, which can cause pain, hearing problems, ringing in the ear, or dizziness, and may require medical treatment to resolve. The use of cotton swabs in the ear canal is one of the most common causes of perforated eardrum, a condition which sometimes requires surgery to correct.

A 2004 study found that the "use of a cotton-tip applicator to clean the ear seems to be the leading cause of otitis externa in children and should be avoided." Instead, wiping wax away from the ear with a washcloth after a shower almost completely cleans the outer one-third of the ear canal, where earwax is made. In the US between 1990 and 2010, an estimated 263,338 children went to hospital emergency rooms for cotton swab injuries, accounting for an estimated annual hospitalization of 13,167 children.

== Environmental impact ==
Plastic cotton swabs are often flushed down the toilet, increasing the risk of marine pollution. Some manufacturers and retailers have stopped making and selling plastic swabs and are only selling biodegradable paper versions.

The European Union instated a ban on the use of plastic-stemmed cotton swabs in 2021. Italy had previously instated a ban in 2019 and Monaco in 2020. England, Scotland, Wales, and the Isle of Man each instated a ban between 2019 and 2021.

== See also ==
- Cotton pad
- Ear pick
