= Colposcopy =

Medical examination of the cervix

- In this diagram, the canal of the cervix (or endocervix) is circled at the base of the womb. The vaginal portion of the cervix projects free into the vagina. The transformation zone, at the opening of the cervix into the vagina, is the area where most abnormal cell changes occur
- Specialty: Gynaecology
- ICD-9-CM: 67
- MeSH: D003127
- OPS-301 code: 1-671

Colposcopy (Ancient Greek: κόλπος, romanized: kolpos, lit. 'hollow, womb, vagina' + skopos, from σκοπέω, skopéō, 'look at') is a medical diagnostic procedure to visually examine the cervix as well as the vagina and vulva using a colposcope.

The main goal of colposcopy is to prevent cervical cancer by detecting and treating precancerous lesions early. Human papillomavirus (HPV) is a common infection and the underlying cause for most cervical cancers. Smoking also makes developing cervical abnormalities more likely.

Other reasons for a patient to have a colposcopy include assessment of diethylstilbestrol (DES) exposure in utero, immunosuppression, abnormal appearance of the cervix or as a part of a sexual assault forensic examination.

Colposcopy is done using a colposcope, which provides a magnified and illuminated view of the areas, allowing the colposcopist to visually distinguish normal from abnormal appearing tissue, such as damaged or abnormal changes in the tissue (lesions), and take directed biopsies for further pathological examination if needed.

Colposcopy has historical roots in the 10th century when Abulcasis, a renowned Arabian physician, pioneered the use of reflected light to inspect internal organs, with the cervix being the first organ examined in this way. The modern procedure was developed by the German physician Hans Hinselmann, with help from Eduard Wirths. The development of colposcopy involved experimentation on Jewish inmates in the Auschwitz concentration camp.

== Indications ==
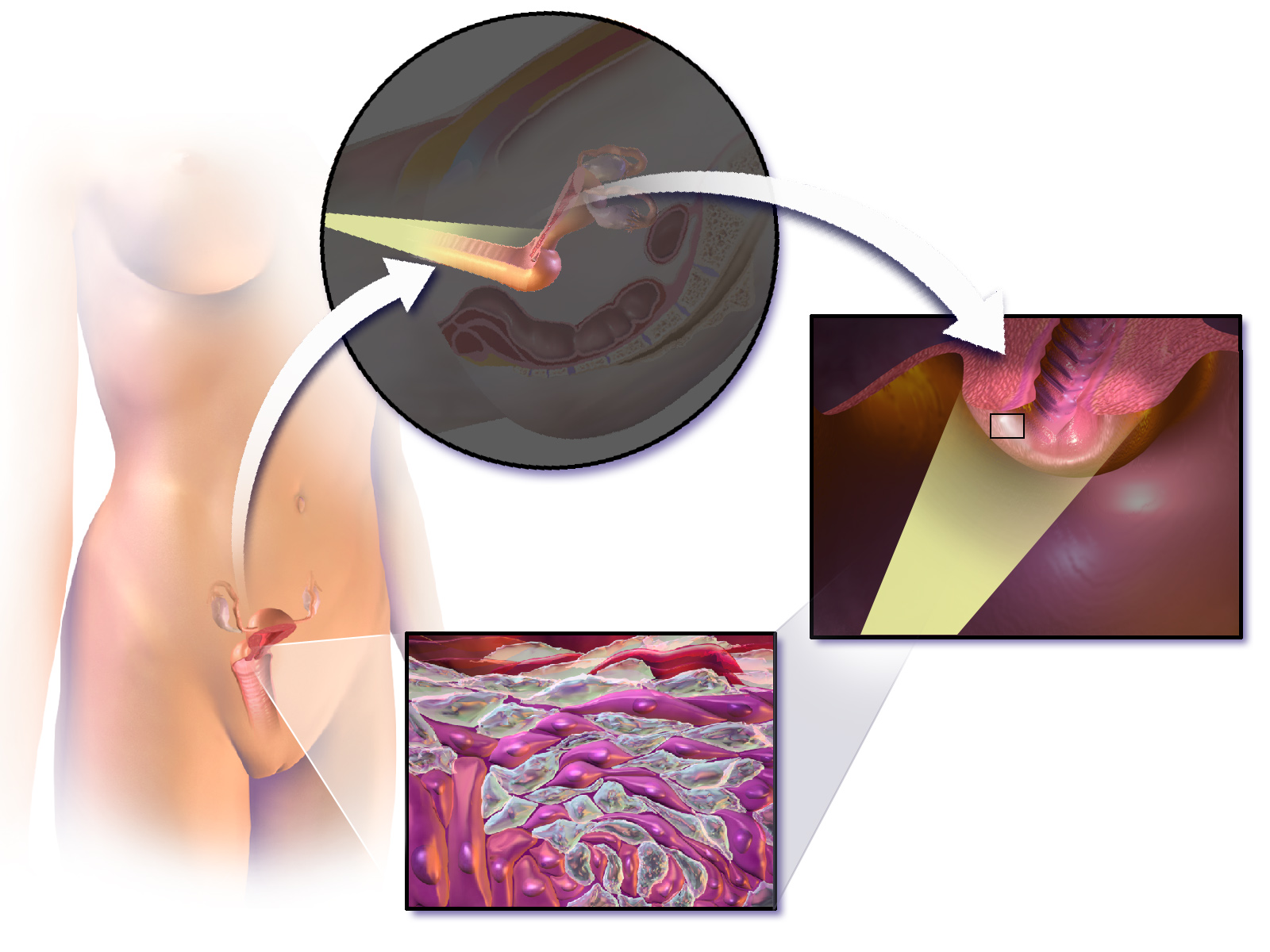
An illustration of a colposcopy procedure.

Most women undergo a colposcopy to further investigate an abnormal pap test result (cytological).

Other reasons for a patient to have a colposcopy include:

- assessment of diethylstilbestrol (DES) exposure in utero,
- immunosuppression such as HIV infection, or an organ transplant patient
- an abnormal appearance of the cervix as noted by a primary care provider
- as a part of a sexual assault forensic examination using a specialized colposcope equipped with a camera

Many physicians base their current evaluation and treatment decisions on the report "Evidence-Based Consensus Recommendations for Colposcopy Practice for Cervical Cancer Prevention in the United States", developed by the American Society for Colposcopy and Cervical Pathology, most recently in 2017.

Colposcopy is not generally performed for people with pap test results showing low-grade squamous intraepithelial lesion (LSIL) or less. SILs are an abnormal growth of epithelial cells, known as a lesion, on the surface of the cervix. Unless the person has a visible lesion, colposcopy for this population does not detect a recurrence of cancer.

== Procedure ==
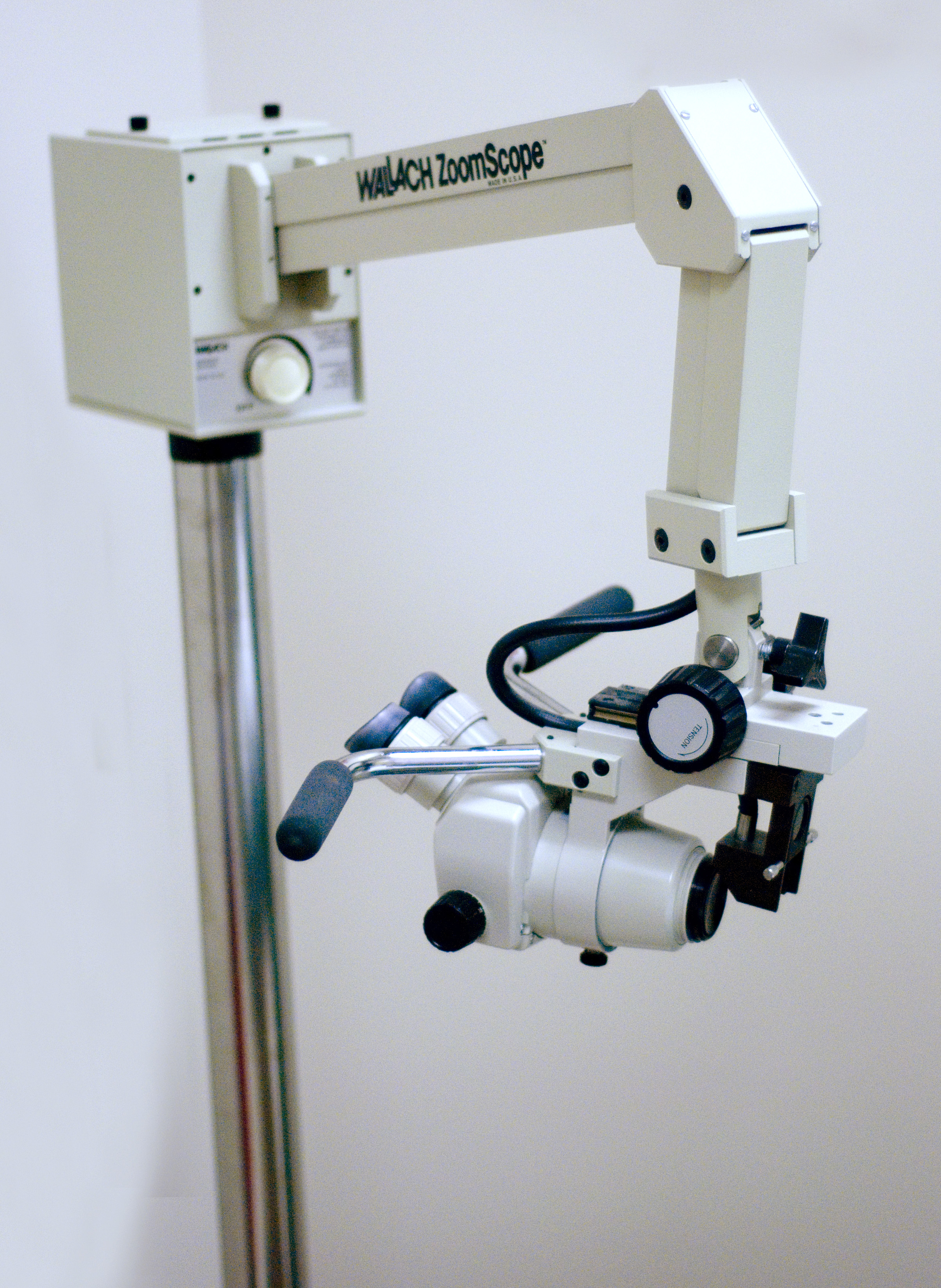
Colposcope

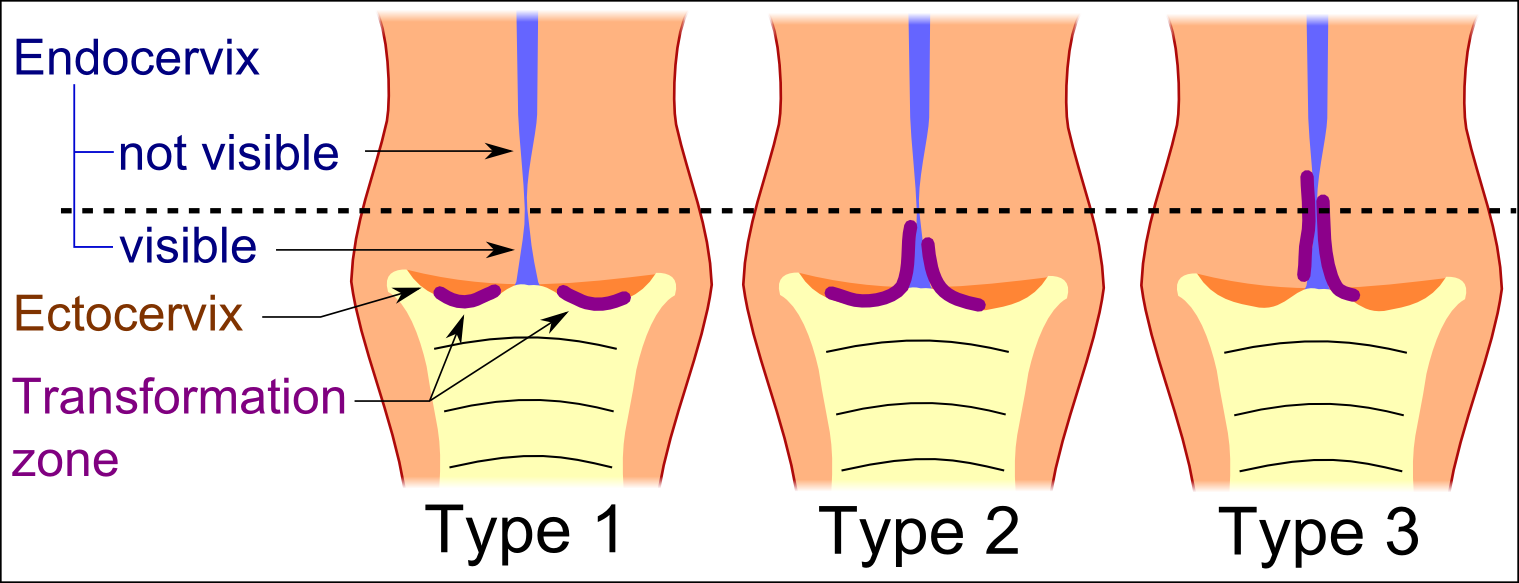
Transformation zone types: Type 1: Completely ectocervical (common under hormonal influence). Type 2: Endocervical component but fully visible (common before puberty). Type 3: Endocervical component, not fully visible (common after menopause).

During the initial evaluation, a medical history is obtained. The procedure is fully described to the patient. In some cases, a pregnancy test may be performed before the procedure, and the patient then signs a consent form. Colposcopy is performed with the woman lying back, legs in stirrups, and buttocks at the lower edge of the table (a position known as the dorsal lithotomy position). A speculum is placed in the vagina after the vulva is examined for any suspicious lesions.

A colposcope is used to identify visible clues suggestive of abnormal tissue. It functions as a lighted binocular or monocular microscope to magnify the view of the cervix, vagina, and vulvar surface.

Low magnification (2× to 6×) may be used to obtain a general impression of the surface architecture. 8× to 25× magnification are utilized to evaluate the vagina and cervix. High magnification, together with a green filter, is often used to identify certain vascular patterns that may indicate the presence of more advanced pre-cancerous or cancerous lesions.

The squamocolumnar junction, or "transformation zone", is a critical area on the cervix where many precancerous and cancerous lesions most often arise. The ability to see the transformation zone and the entire extent of any lesion visualized determines whether an adequate colposcopic examination is attainable.

Acetic acid solution is applied to the surface of the cervix using cotton swabs to improve visualization of abnormal areas. Areas of the cervix that turn white (acetowhiteness) after the application of acetic acid or have an abnormal vascular pattern are often considered for biopsy. If no lesions are visible, an iodine solution may be applied to the cervix to help highlight areas of abnormality.

After a complete examination, the colposcopist determines the areas with the highest degree of visible abnormality and may obtain biopsies from these areas using a long biopsy instrument, such as a punch forceps, SpiraBrush CX or SoftBiopsy. Most doctors and patients consider anesthesia unnecessary if a biopsy is not performed; however, some colposcopists now recommend and use a topical anesthetic such as lidocaine or a cervical block to decrease patient discomfort, particularly if biopsy samples are taken or endocervical curettage is done since the latter procedures often cause more pain than a diagnostic colposcopy without biopsy.. However, oral nonsteroidal anti-inflammatory drugs (e.g., ibuprofen) and topical anesthetics, such as benzocaine, are no more effective than a placebo for pain relief during colposcopy procedures. Local injection of anesthetics (e.g., 1% lidocaine) with a paracervical block significantly reduces pain compared to receiving no anesthesia during the procedure. Colposcopy-related pain is usually mild to moderate, but some women experience severe pain with the procedure.

Biopsy techniques may include a punch biopsy of visible abnormalities or an endocervical curettage (ECC), which samples the endocervical canal as it cannot be directly visualized during the colposcopy. The ECC utilizes a long straight curette, a Soft-ECC curette employing fabric to simultaneously collect tissue, or a cytobrush (like a small pipe-cleaner) to scrape the inside of the cervical canal. The ECC should never be done on a patient who is pregnant. Monsel's solution is applied with large cotton swabs to the surface of the cervix to control bleeding. This solution looks like mustard and turns black when exposed to blood. After the procedure, this material will be expelled naturally: Patients can expect to have a thin coffee-ground like discharge for up to several days after the procedure. Alternatively, some physicians achieve hemostasis with silver nitrate.

== Interpretation ==
Locations of colposcopy findings can be described in terms of quadrants, or corresponding to a clock face when the subject is in supine position.

One model for scoring colposcopy findings is the Swede Score, which assigns a score between 0 and 2 for five different parameters, based on what is visible during the colposcopy, as given in table below:

Swede Score for interpreting colposcopy findings
| Parameter | Score | | |
| Parameter | 0 | 1 | 2 |
|---|---|---|---|
| Uptake of acetic acid | 0 or transparent | Shady, milky | Distinct, stearin-like |
| Margins and surface | 0 or diffuse | Sharp, but irregular, jagged, "geographical" satellites | Sharp and even, difference in surface level such as "cutting" |
| Vessels | Fine, regular | Absent | Coarse or atypical |
| Lesion size | < 5 mm | 5–15 mm or spanning 2 quadrants | > 15 mm or spanning 3–4 quadrants or endocervically undefined |
| Iodine staining | Brown | Faintly or patchy yellow | Distinct yellow |

The total Swede Score ranges between 0 and 10. A score of 5 or above is reported to identify all potential high-grade lesions (HGL) and 8 or above to have a 90% chance of being a HGL. A score below 5 does not require biopsy because of low risk of cancer, a score from 5 to 7 requires biopsy, and a score 8 or above does not require biopsy because it is likely more efficient to intervene directly (e.g., by excision).

== Complications ==
Significant complications from a colposcopy are not common but may include bleeding, infection at the biopsy site or endometrium, and failure to identify the lesion. Monsel's solution and silver nitrate interfere with the interpretation of biopsy specimens, so these substances are not applied until all biopsies have been taken. Some patients experience a degree of discomfort during the curettage, and many experience discomfort during the biopsy.

Colposcopy with biopsy does not cause infertility or subfertility.

== Follow up ==
Adequate follow-up is critical to the success of this procedure. Treatments for significant lesions include ablative treatments (cryotherapy, thermocoagulation, and laser ablation) and excisional methods (loop electrosurgical excision procedure or LEEP, or Cervical conization).
