= Instruments used in oncology =

Instruments used in oncology are specialized tools and devices used for the diagnosis, treatment, monitoring, and management of cancer. These instruments help oncologists detect tumors, assess disease progression, deliver therapies, and provide supportive care to patients.

Common instruments used in oncology include:

- Biopsy needle – used to collect tissue samples for cancer diagnosis.
- Endoscope – to examine internal organs and detect abnormal growths.
- PET scanner – to detect cancer spread and metabolic activity.
- CT scanner – to locate tumors and monitor treatment response.
- MRI machine – to produce detailed images of soft tissues and tumors.
- Linear accelerator – used in radiation therapy to target and destroy cancer cells.
- Chemotherapy infusion pump – to deliver anticancer drugs in controlled doses.
- Bone marrow aspiration needle – to collect bone marrow samples, especially in blood cancers.
- Mammography machine – used for breast cancer screening and diagnosis.
- Colposcope – used to examine the cervix for signs of cervical cancer.
- Cryotherapy equipment – used to freeze and destroy abnormal or cancerous tissues.
- Surgical instruments – used during tumor removal and cancer-related surgeries.

These instruments play an important role in improving cancer diagnosis, treatment accuracy, and patient outcomes.

The World Health Organization also lists priority medical devices for cancer management, including devices for diagnostic imaging, image-guided biopsy, radiotherapy, quality assurance, and interventional procedures.
