= Instruments used in obstetrics and gynecology =

The following is a list of instruments that are used in modern obstetrics and gynaecology.

Instrument	Uses
Speculum	A specialized form of vaginal speculum is the weighted speculum, which consists of a broad half tube which is bent at about a 90 degree angle, with the channel of the tube on the exterior side of the angle. One end of the tube has a roughly spherical metal weight surrounding the channel of the speculum. A weighted speculum is placed in the vagina during vaginal surgery with the patient in the lithotomy position. The weight holds the speculum in place and frees the surgeon's hands for other tasks.
Auvard's speculum	Speculum used in standard vaginal procedures.
Cusco's speculum	Bivalved self retaining speculum. Its advantage over Sim's speculum is that no assistance is required to hold it in place. Hence, minor procedures like papsmear, IUCD insertions can be performed independently. Its disadvantage is the limited visualization of vagina walls.
Sim's double-bladed posterior vaginal speculum	
Scalpel	
Vulsellum	
Single toothed vulsellum	
Multiple toothed vulsellum	
Giant vulsellum	
Mucus sucker - disposable or metal	
Forceps	
Long straight hemostatic forceps	
Allis tissue forceps	
Babcock's forceps	
Lanes tissue forceps	
Uterus holding forceps	
Sponge holding forceps	
Kocher's artery forceps	
Kocher's forceps with toothed jaws	
Green-Armytage hemostatic forceps	Can be used during Myomectomy.
Willet's scalp traction forceps	
Ovum forceps	
Punch biopsy forceps	Used in Premalignant lesions of the cervix. Its provides a specimen.
Uterine dressing forceps	
FemCerv Endocervical Sampler	The FDA cleared disposable FemCerv endocervical Sampler can be used to biopsy the endocervical canal during colposcopyor the evaluation of abnormal uterine bleeding. FemCerv is intended to collect a 360° Endocervical tissue sample for histological evaluation. After collection the device is closed to contain and protect the sample within the patented collection chamber. To release the tissue sample the device is opened and the tip swished in a vial of fixative. The sample is then sent to the pathology lab for processing..
SpiraBrush CX	An ectocervical biopsy brush used in place of punch forceps during colposcopy to collect a full transepithelial tissue sample. The resulting sample is then sent to a pathology lab for evaluation and diagnosis of cervical cancer. Abnormalities in these samples are similar to those seen in traditional cervical biopsies, and range from reactive squamous and glandular epithelial cells to overt invasive carcinoma.
SoftECC	The FDA Compliant disposable Soft-ECC endocervical curette can be used to biopsy the endocervical canal during colposcopy or the evaluation of abnormal uterine bleeding. Unlike the conventional sharp endocervical curette, the Soft-ECC is intended to gently frictionally abrade and collect abundant trans-epithelial tissue samples into the patent pending KYLON fabric. The tip device containing the sample can be placed in the fixative vial and transported to the lab. In the lab, the tissue can be easily and efficiently removed from the curette fabric for processing that is identical to the conventional endocervical curettage tissue sample.
SoftBiopsy	The FDA Compliant disposable SoftBiopsy can be used to biopsy the exocervix and lower genital tract during colposcopy or when a suspicious lesion is detected. Unlike the “sharp edge” biopsy design of gynecological biopsy devices, the SoftBiopsy design is intended to gently frictionally abrade and collect abundant trans-epithelial tissue samples into the patent pending KYLON fabric. The tip device containing the sample can be placed in the fixative vial and transported to the lab. In the lab, the tissue can be easily and efficiently removed from the curette fabric for processing that is identical to the conventional lower genital tract biopsy or curettage tissue sample.
Laminaria tent introducing forceps with laminaria tent	
•Needle holding forceps	
••Straight	
••Curved	
•Toothed dissecting forceps	
•Untoothed dissecting forceps	
•Delivery forceps	
••Long curved obstetrics forceps	
••Das's long curved obstetrics forceps	
•• Wrigley's forceps	
••Kielland's forceps	
Axis traction device	
Cannula	
•Karman's plastic suction cannula	
•Hysterosalpingography cannula	
•Insufflation cannula	
•Budine's cannula	
Scissors	
•Episiotomy scissors	
•Embryotomy scissors	
•Mayo's scissors	
•Bonney scissors	
•Metzenbaum scissors	
•Perineorrhaphy scissors	
•Long straight scissors	
Uterine sound	
Cervical dilators	
•Hawkin-Ambler's	
•Das	
Ventouse cups	
•Metallic	
•Silastic	
Oldham's perforator	
Cranioclast	
Hook with crochet	
Jardine's decapitation hook with knife	
Pinnard's stethoscope	
Disposable cord-clamp	
Curette	
•Flushing curette	
•Uterine curette	
•Sharp curette	
•Shaman's curette	
Retractors	
•Doyen's retractor	
•Landon's retractor	
•Anterior vaginal wall retractor	
•Balfour self-retaining retractor	
•Deaver's retractor	
Electronic fetal monitor with abdominal transducers	
Implants	
•Copper-T uterine	
•Hormonal implants e.g. Norplant	
Laparoscopic instruments for tubal sterilization	
•Veress needle	
•Trochar	
•Cannula	
•Hysteroscope	
•Telescope	
•Coagulators	
•Graspers	
•Scissors	
Spatula and cytobrush	
Catheters	
•Metallic - male or female	
•Rubber	
Myoma screw	Used to stabilize and manipulate non-degenerating myomas, fibroids or other tissues intended for removal during laparoscopic procedures.
Towel clips	
Clamps	
•Bonney's myomectomy clamp	
•Cervical occlusion clamp	
•Barkelay Bonney vaginal clamp	
Pessary	
•Hodge-Smith type	
•Ring type	
Colposcope	
Perineometer	

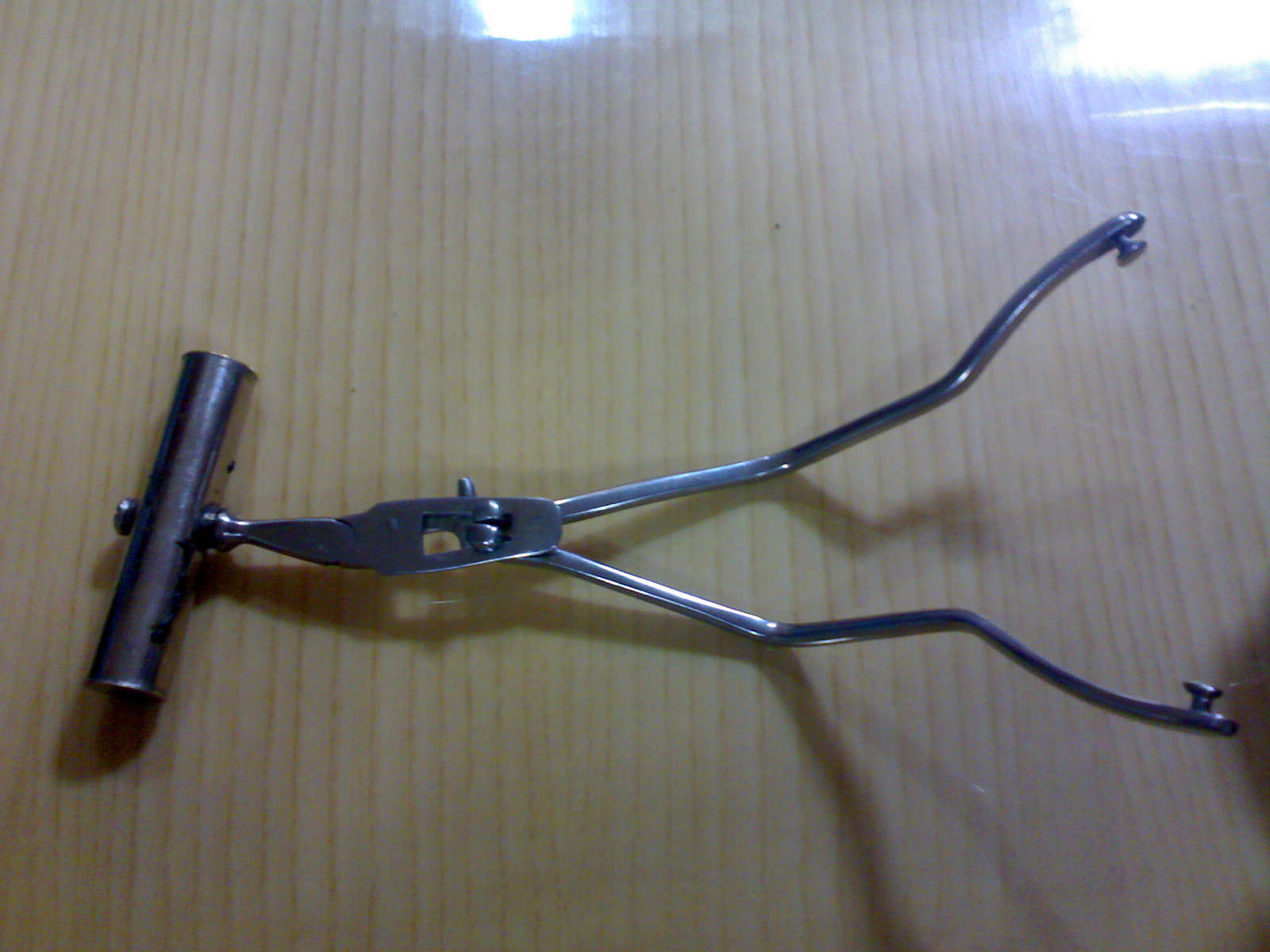
Axis traction device for delivery forceps

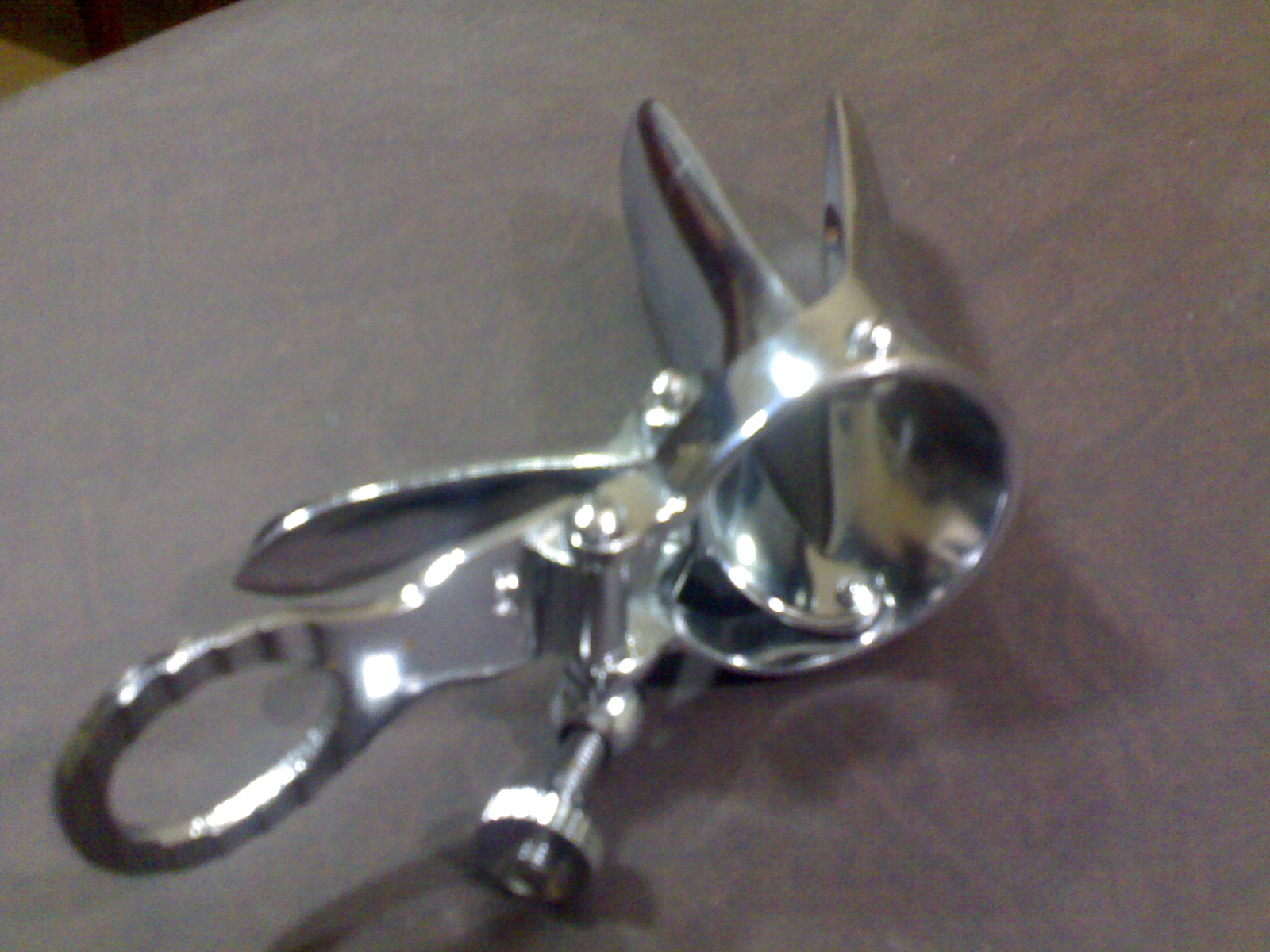
Cusco's self retaining bivalve vaginal speculum seen from behind

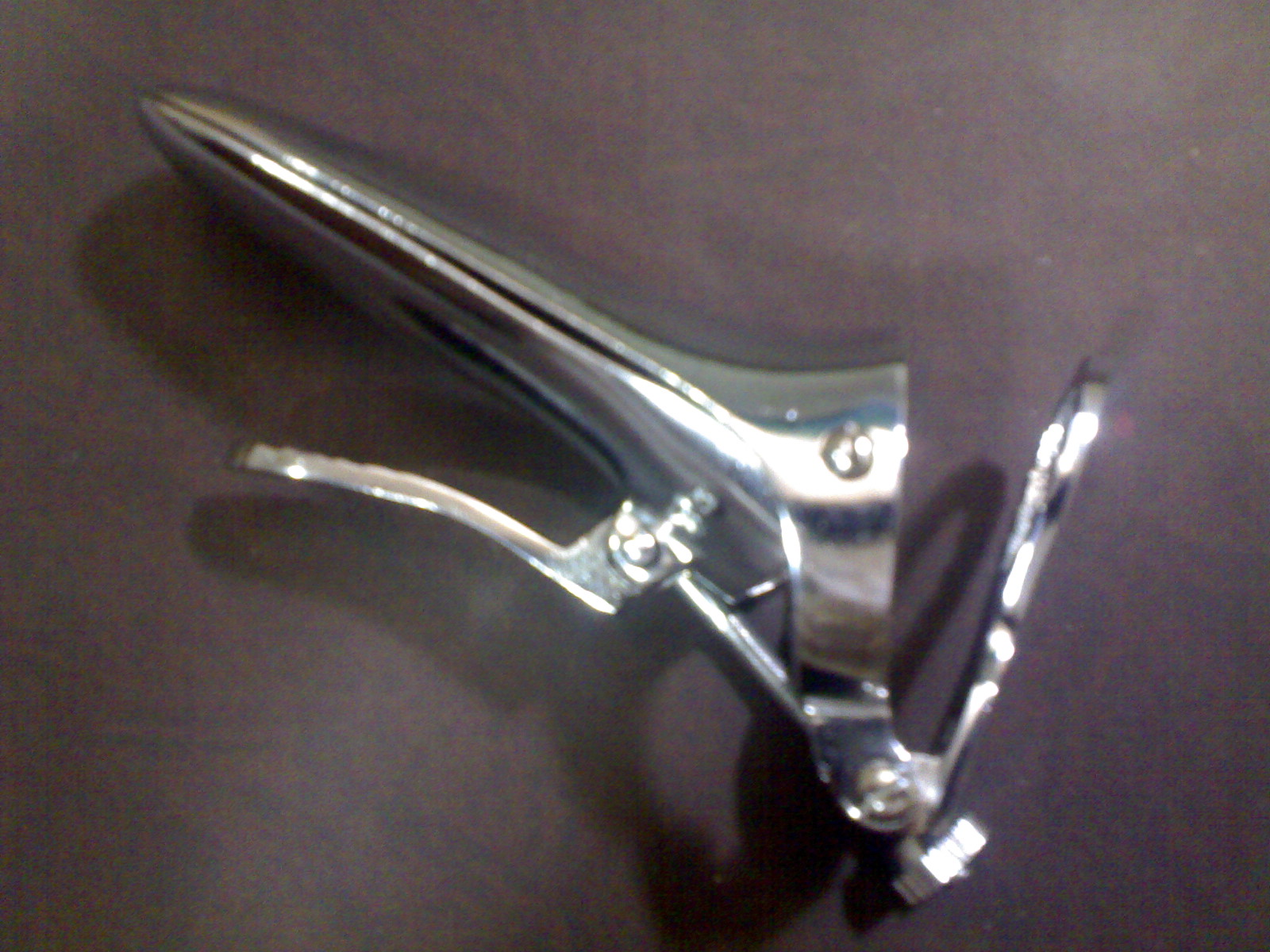
Cusco's self retaining bivalve vaginal speculum (closed) seen from the left. It is very much used in taking smears from the vagina for Papanicolaou test and routine examinations.

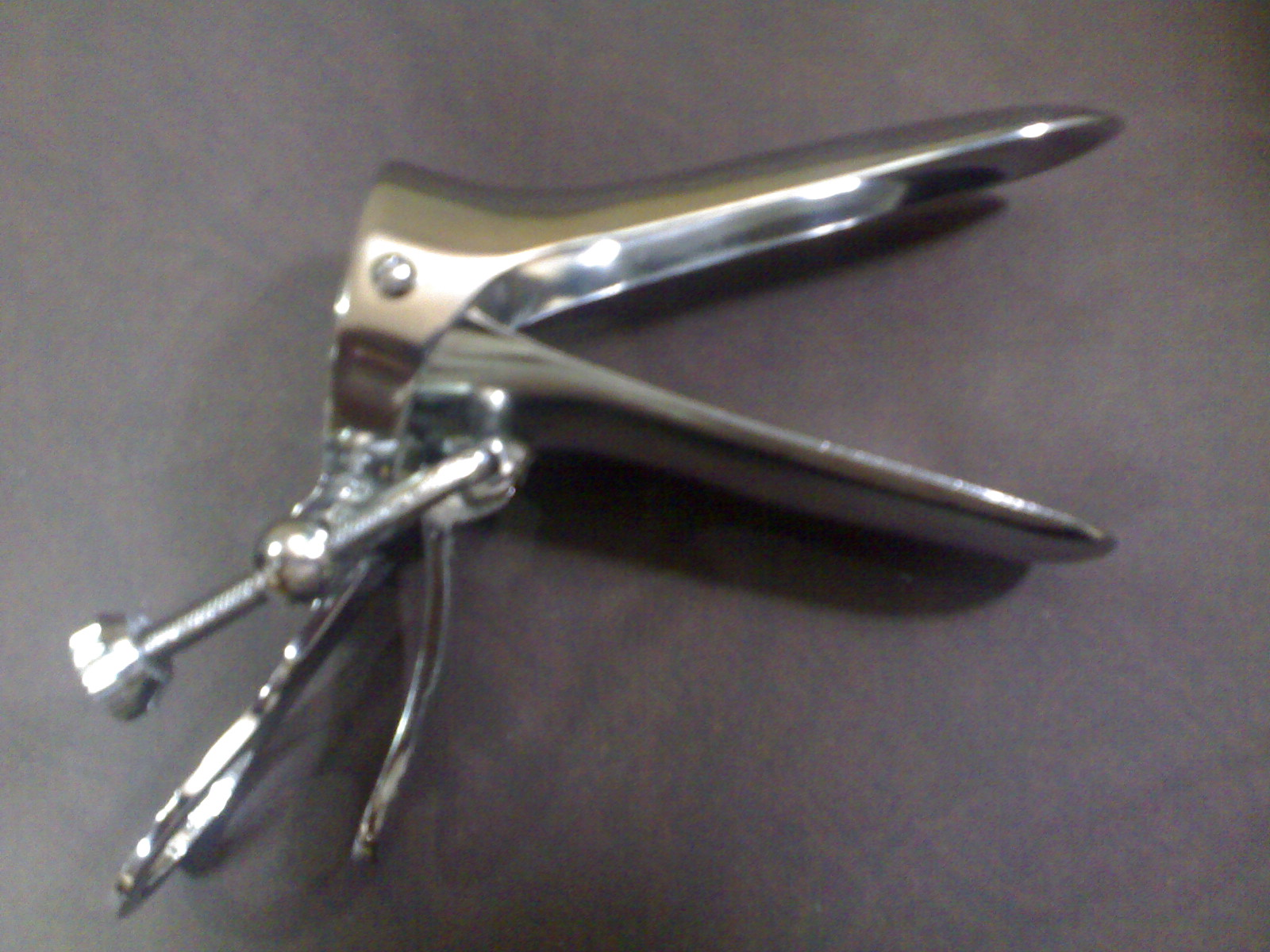
Cusco's self retaining bivalve vaginal speculum (opened) seen from the right

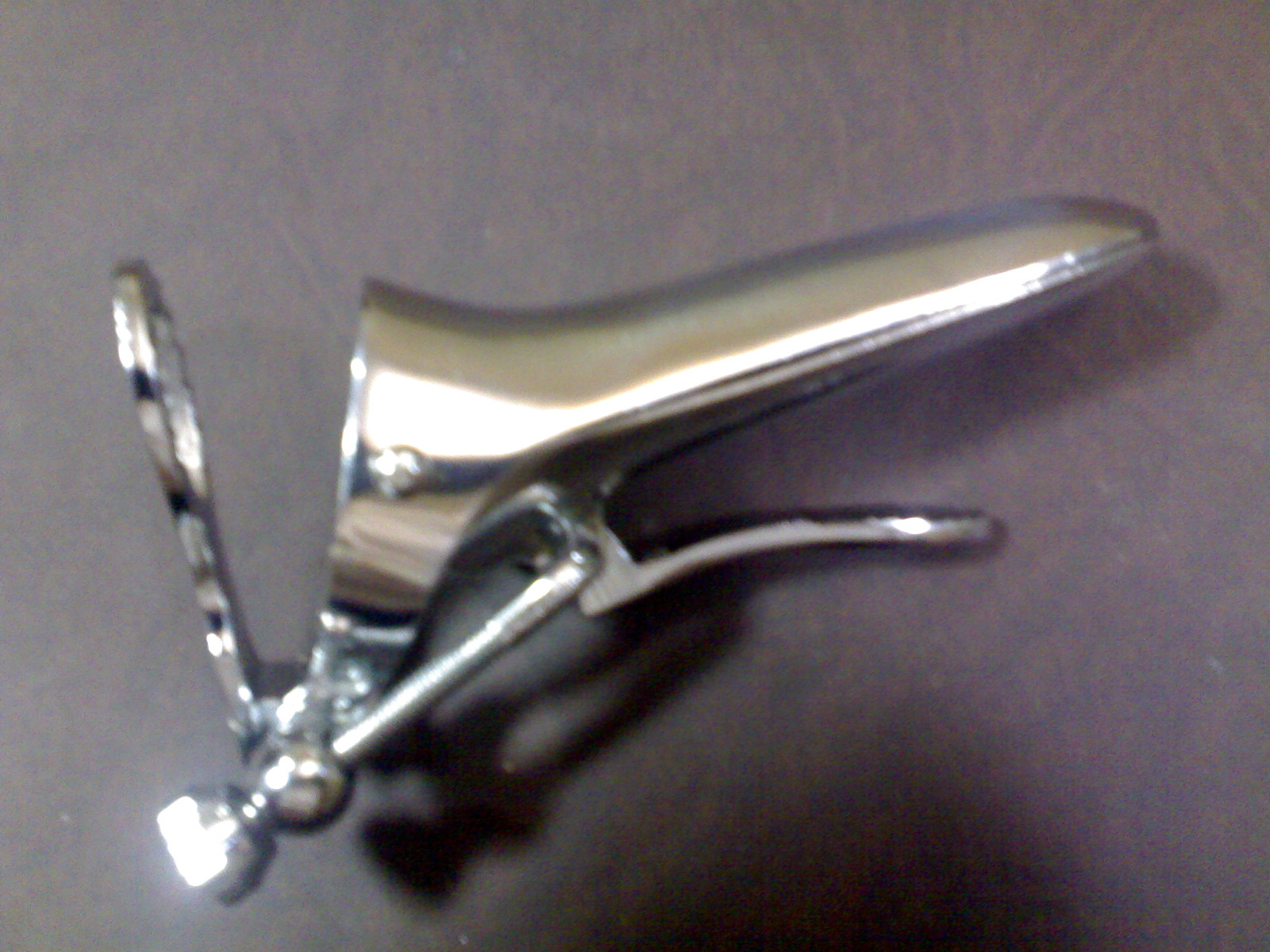
Cusco's self retaining bivalve vaginal speculum (closed) seen from the right

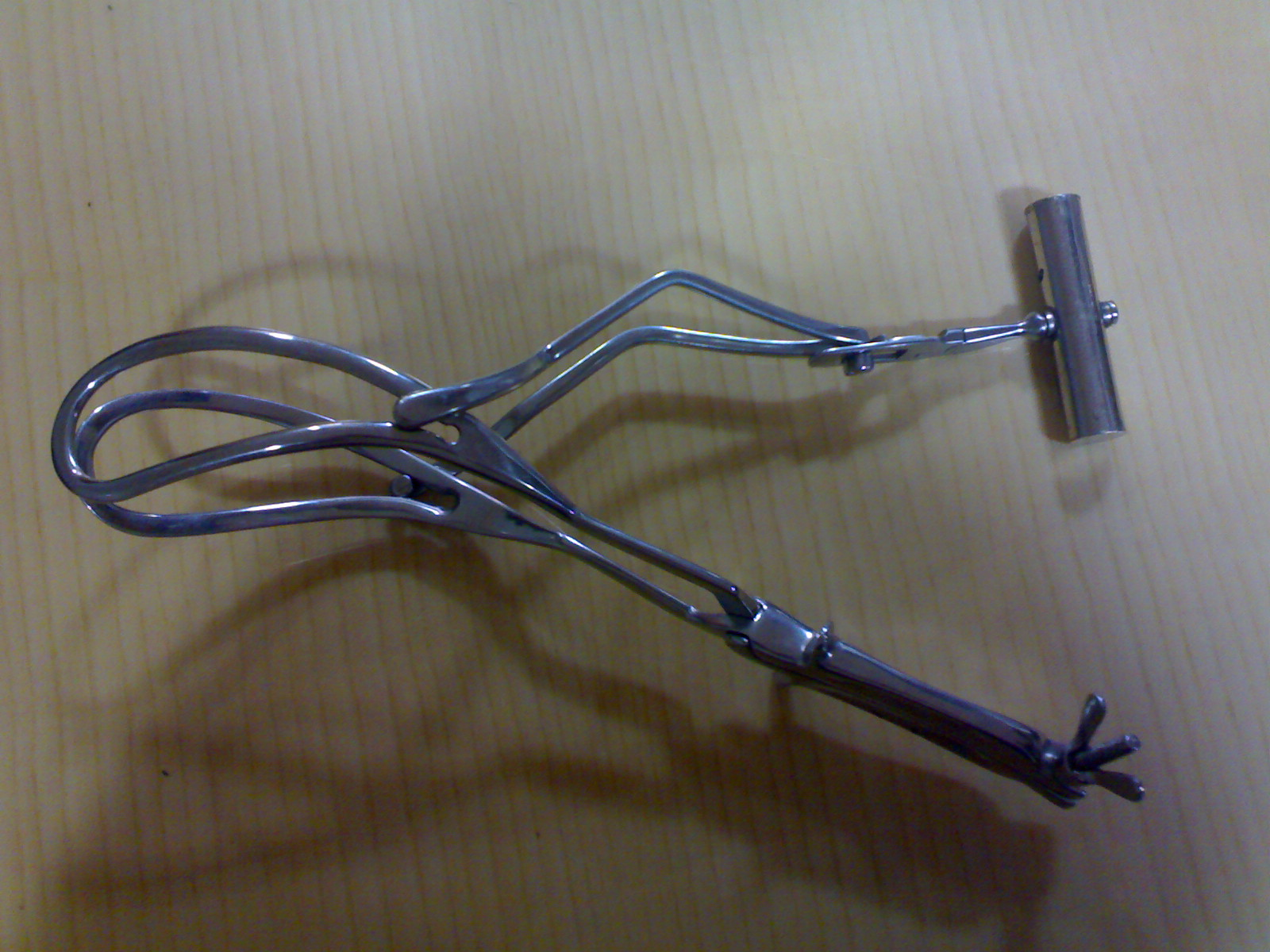
Das's modification to the long curved delivery forceps (shorter in length) with axis traction devices in place, seen from the right side (left blade on top: with respect to the mother's vaginal wall)

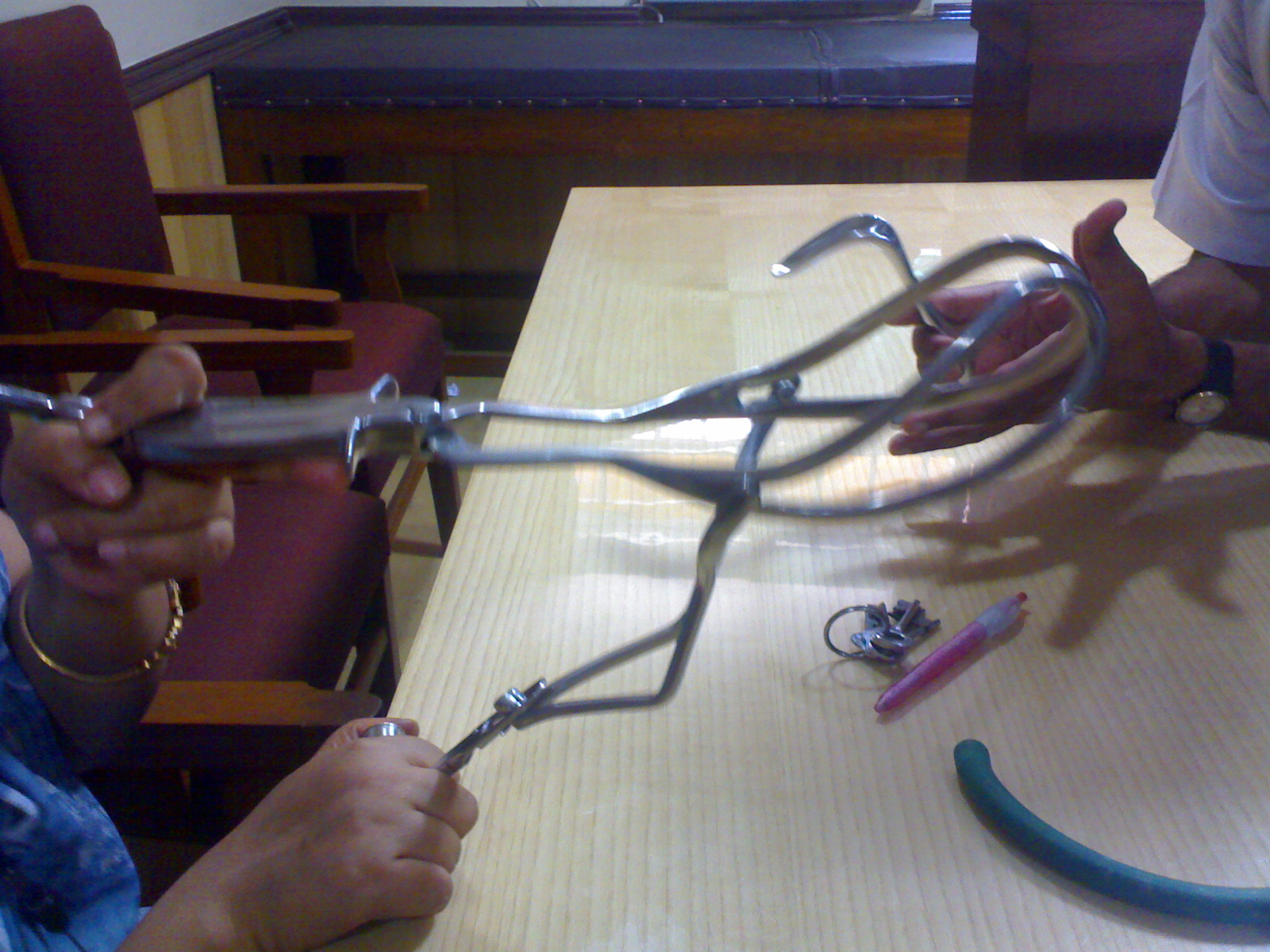
Das's modification to the long curved delivery forceps (shorter in length) with axis traction devices in place, seen from the right side (left blade in front: with respect to the mother's vaginal wall). The instrument is held in properly as during a delivery.

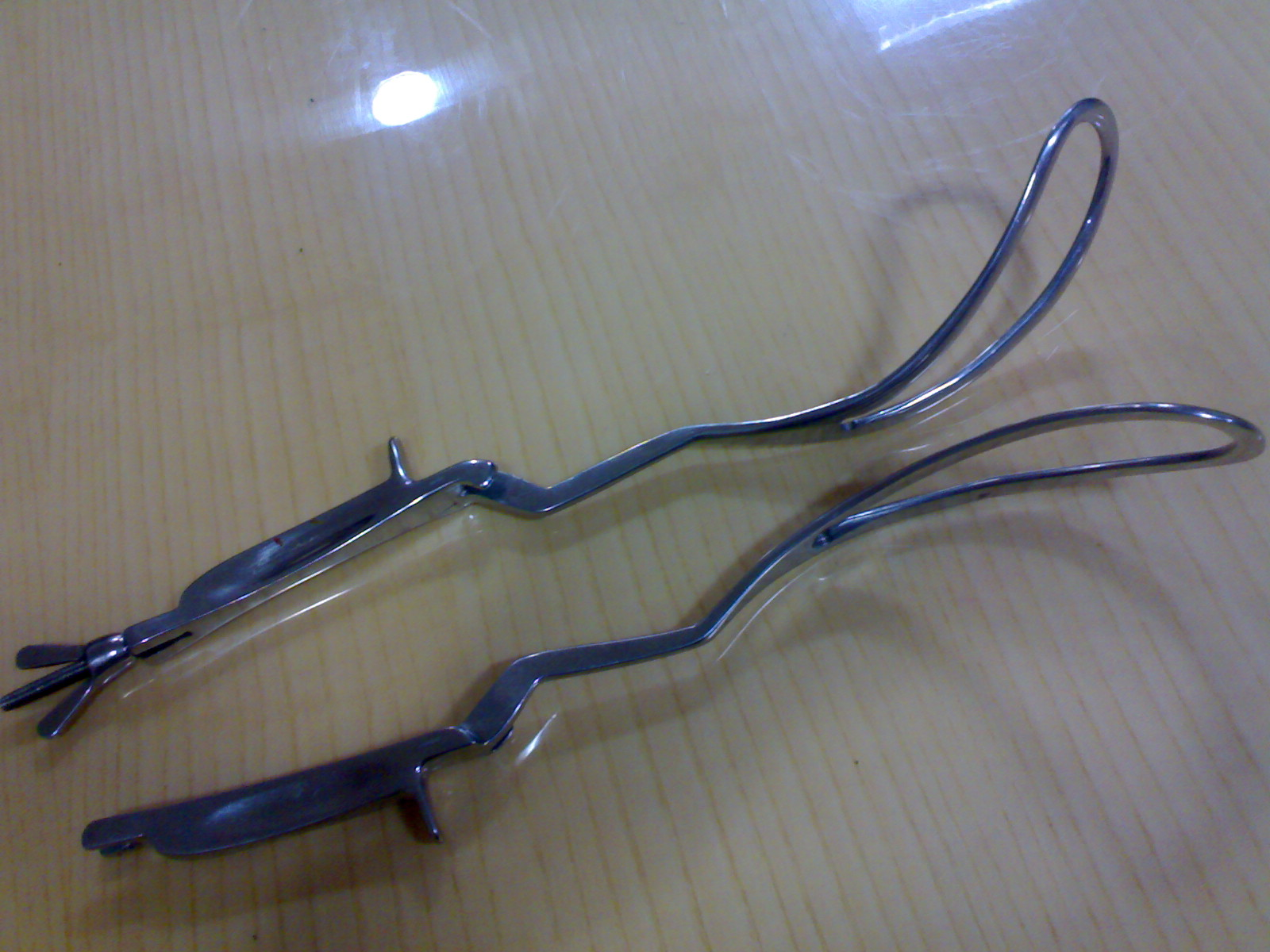
Das's modification to the long curved delivery forceps with the blades lying loose. The one with the lock is the left blade (judged with respect to the mother).

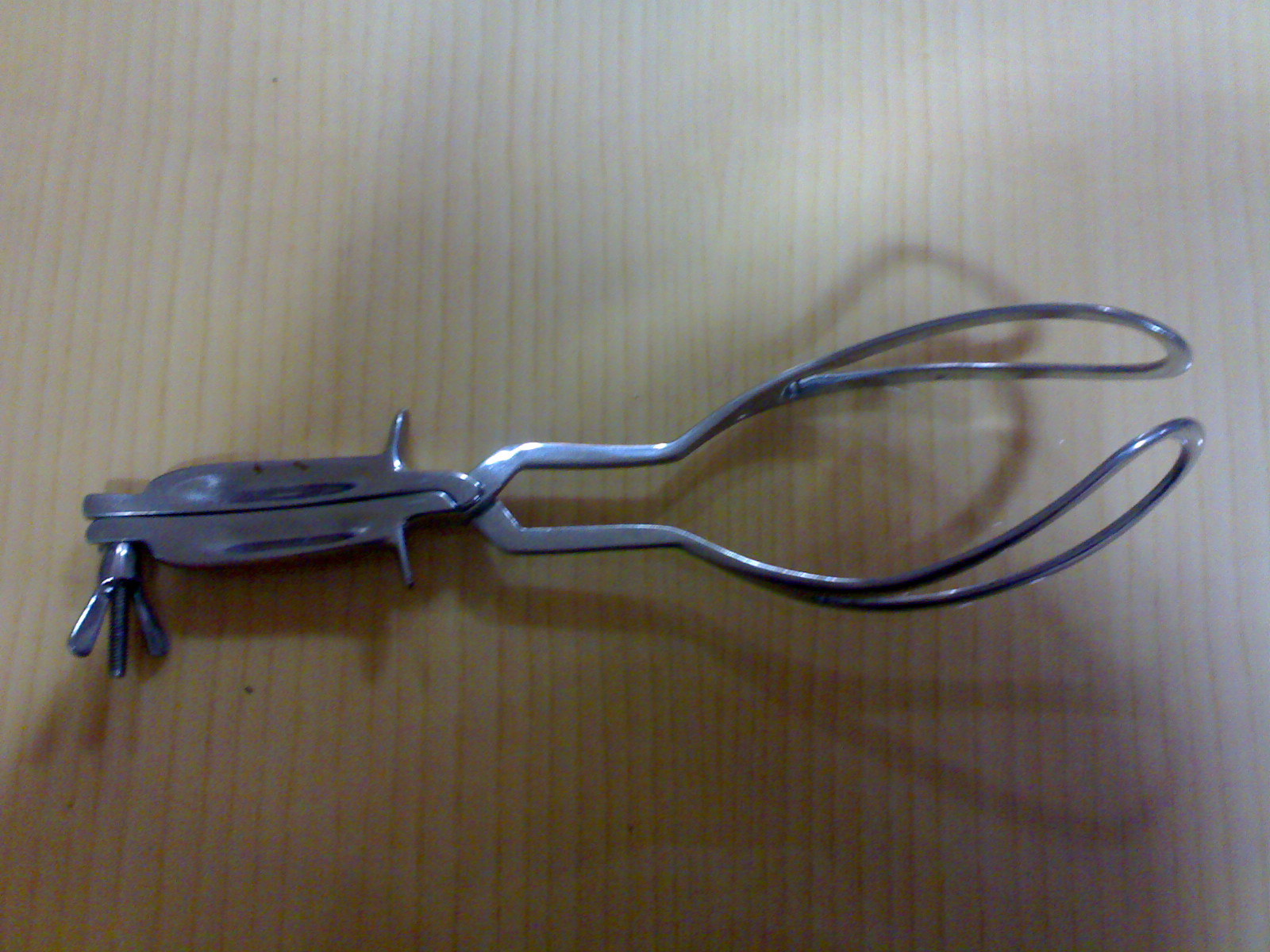
Das's modification to the long curved delivery forceps with the blades locked in place

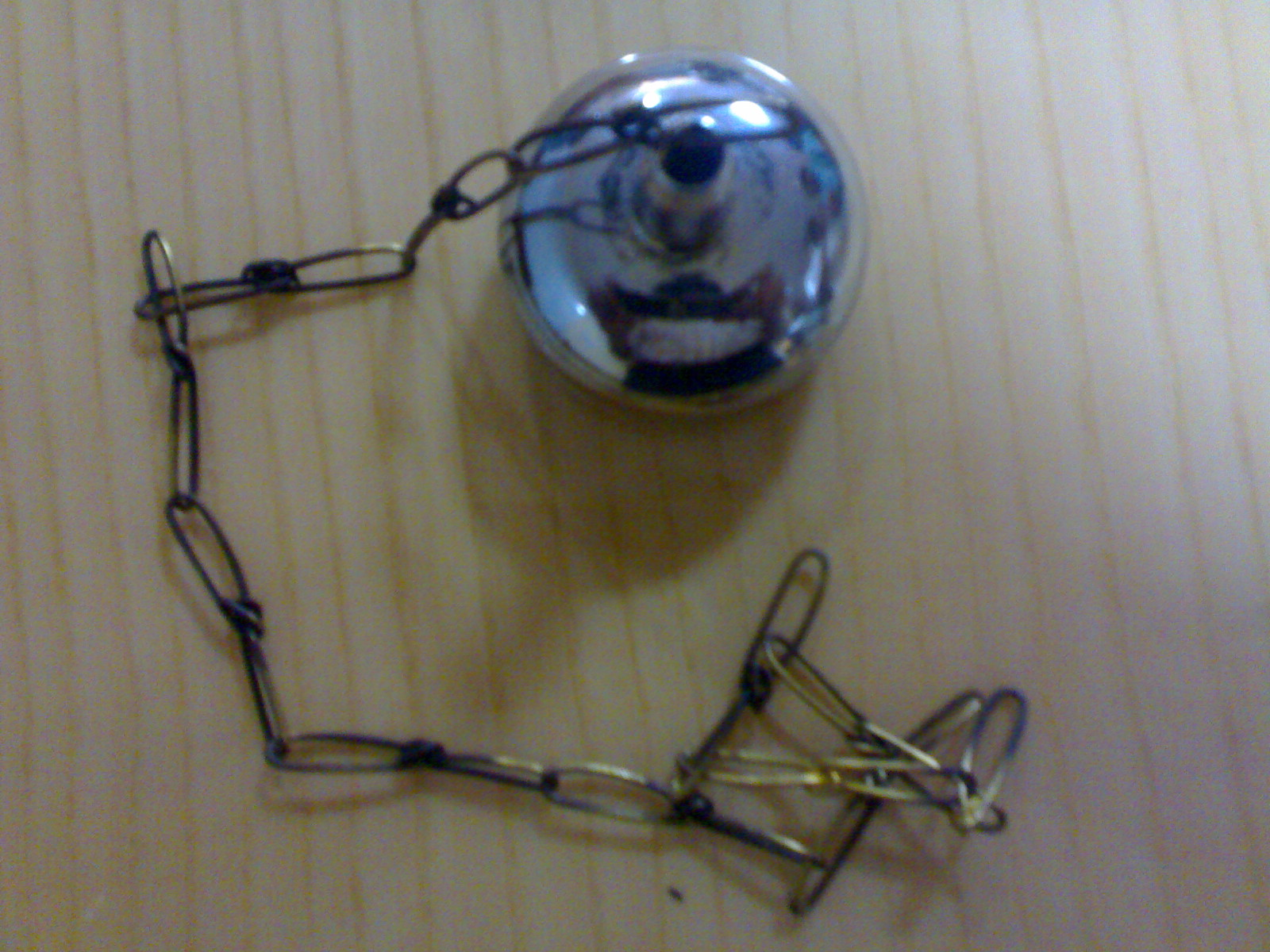
Metallic cup for the Ventouse suction device used to assist deliveries

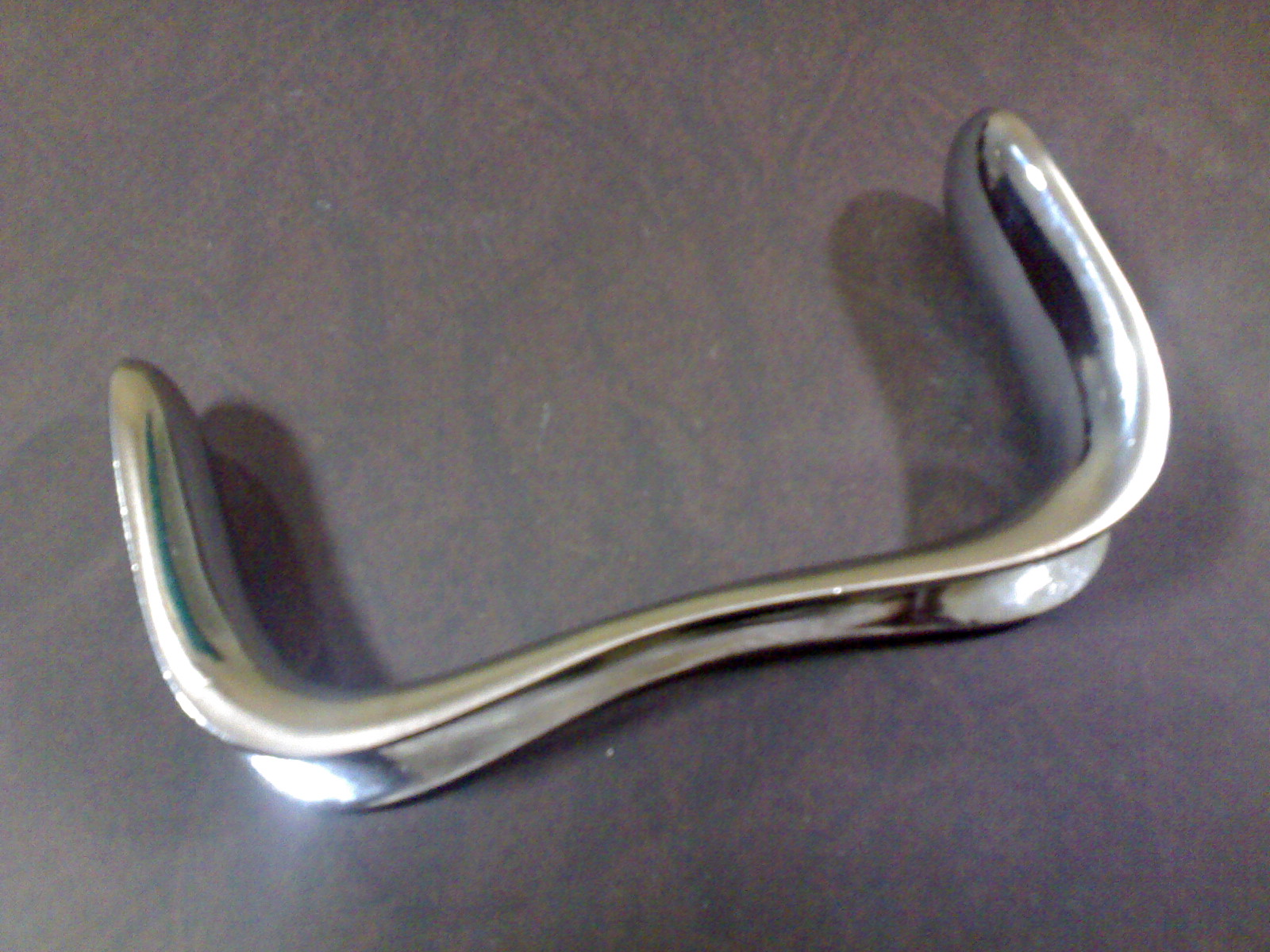
Sim's double-bladed vaginal speculum

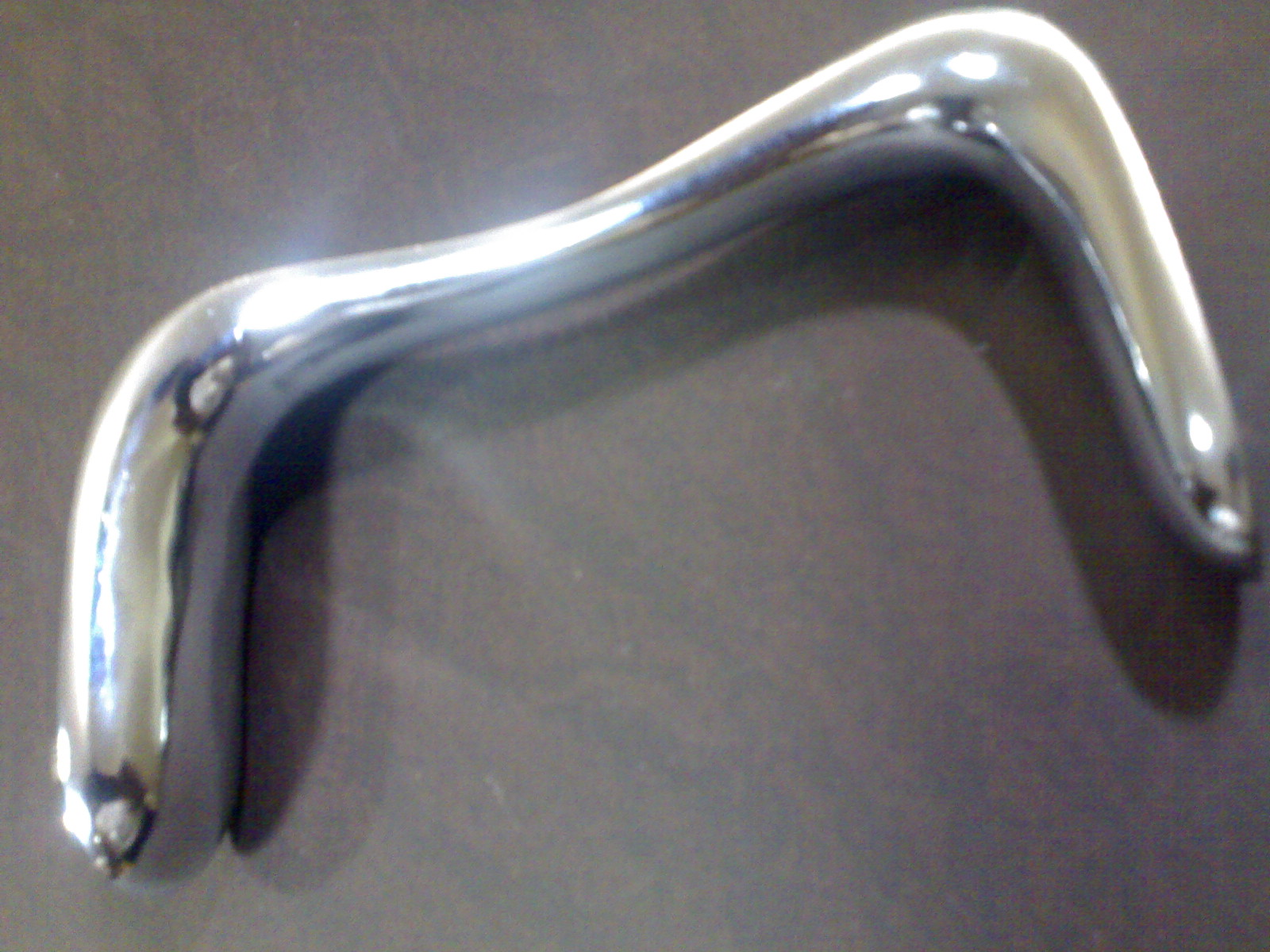
Sim's double-bladed vaginal speculum

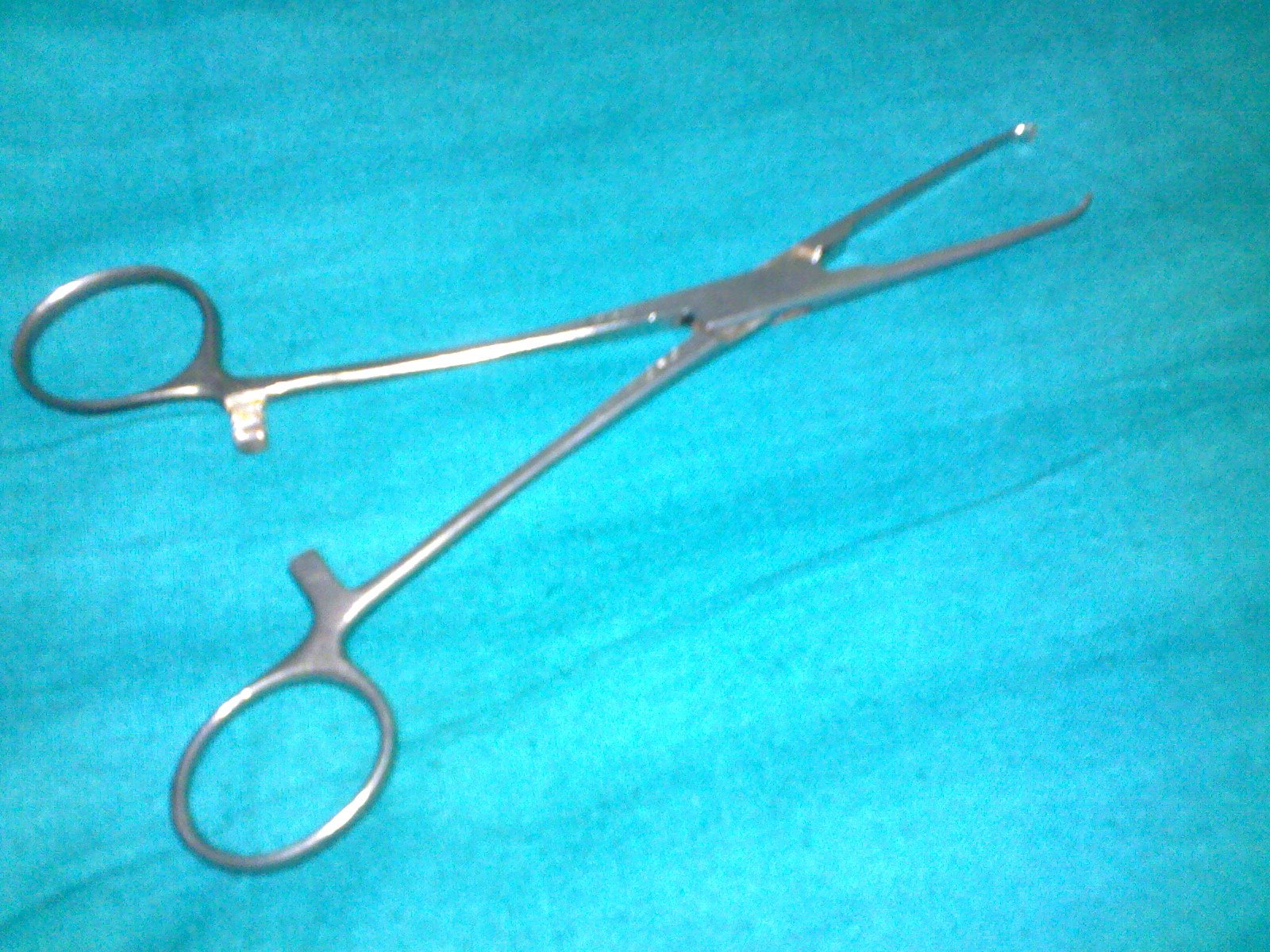
Allis tissue forceps

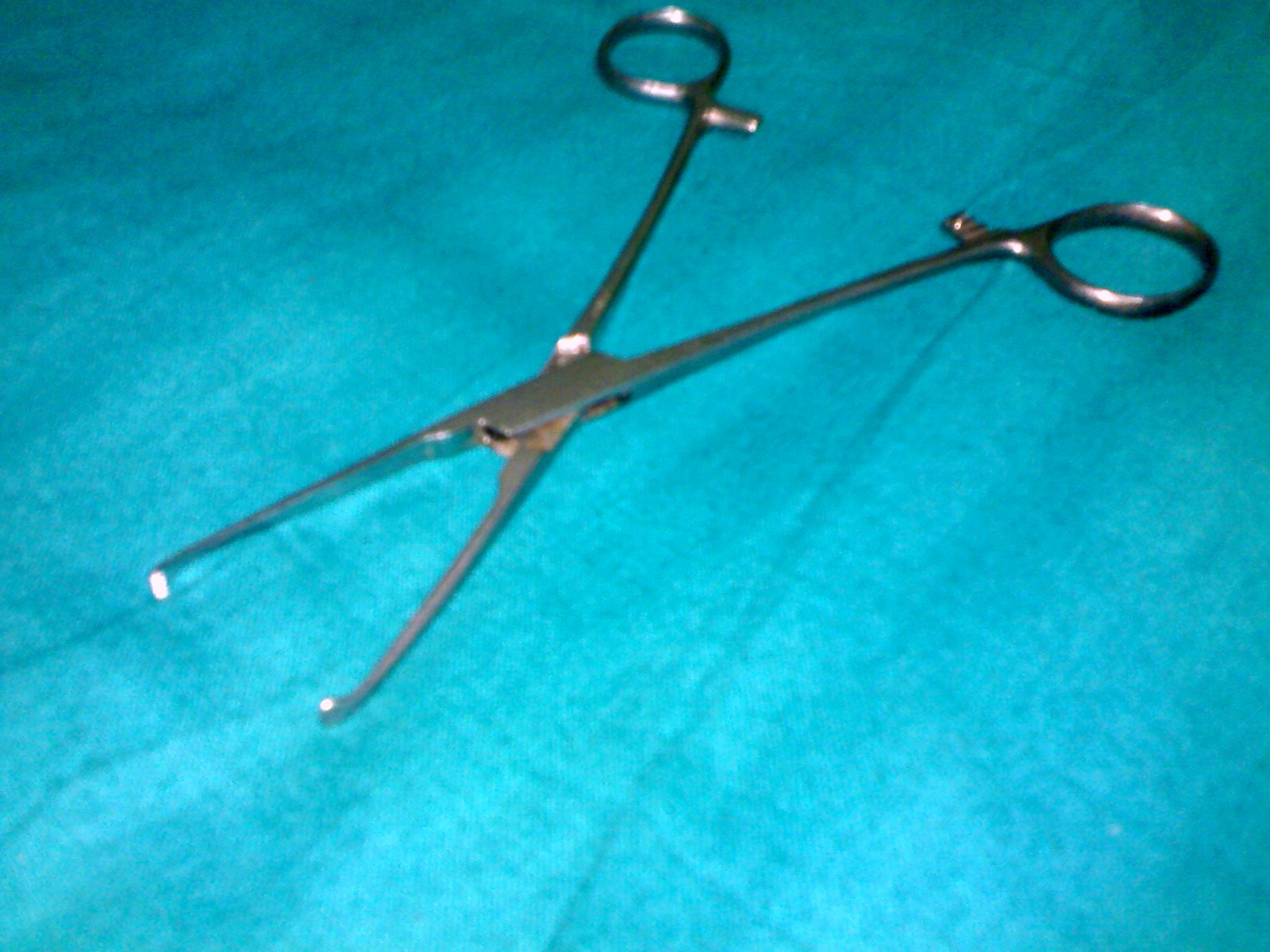
Allis tissue forceps

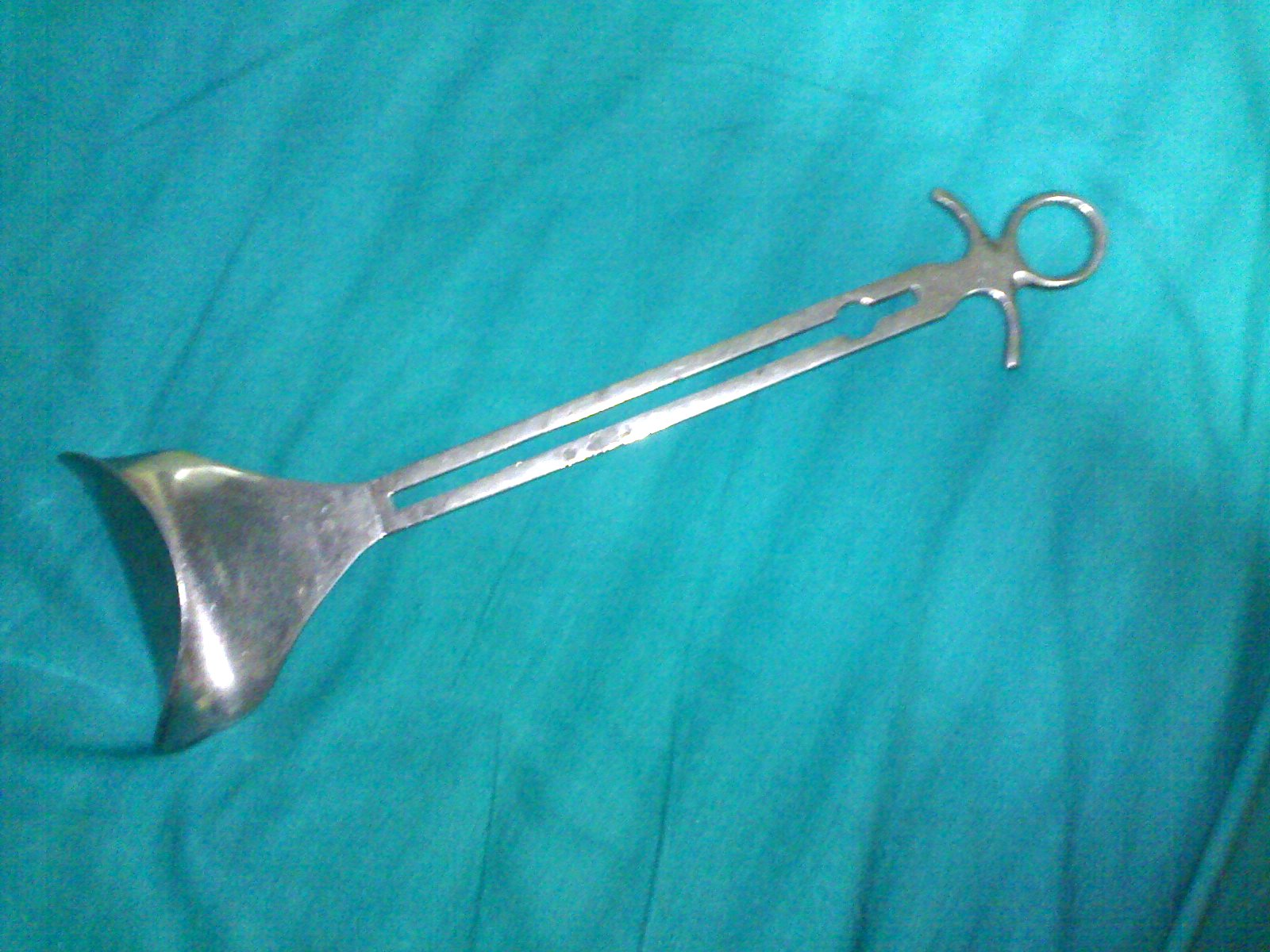
Doyen's retractor

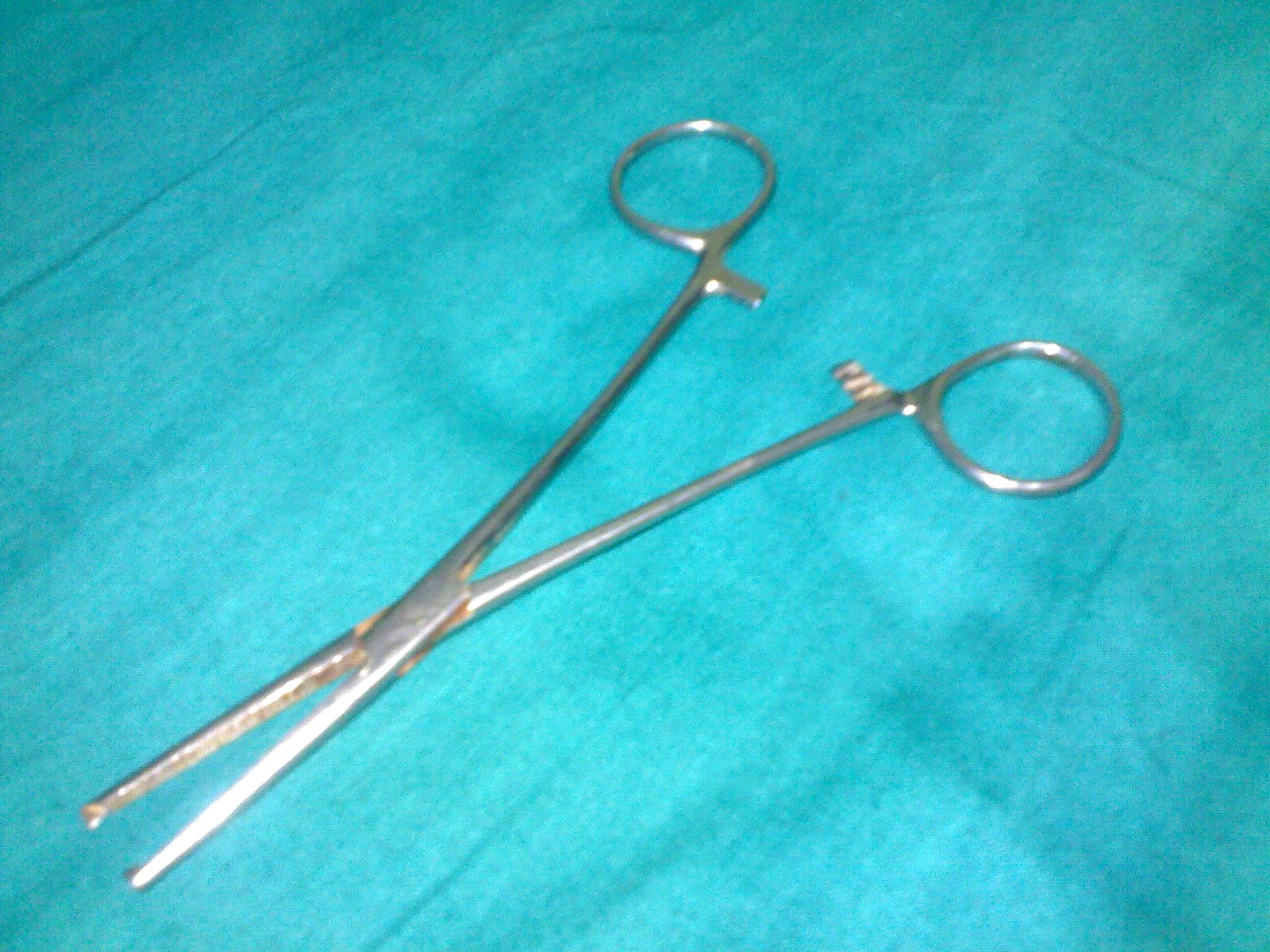
Kocher's forceps with toothed jaw

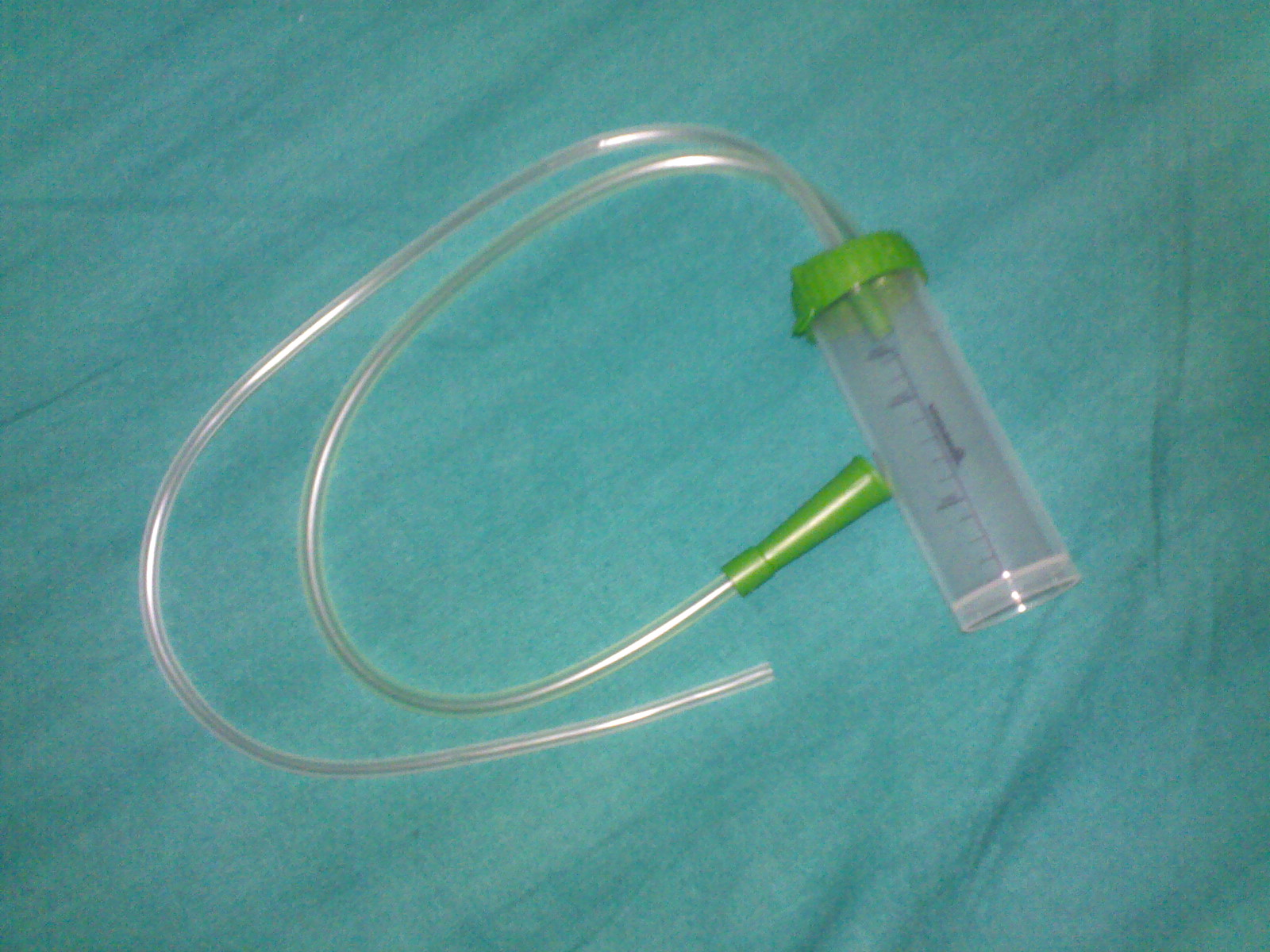
Disposable manual mucous sucker

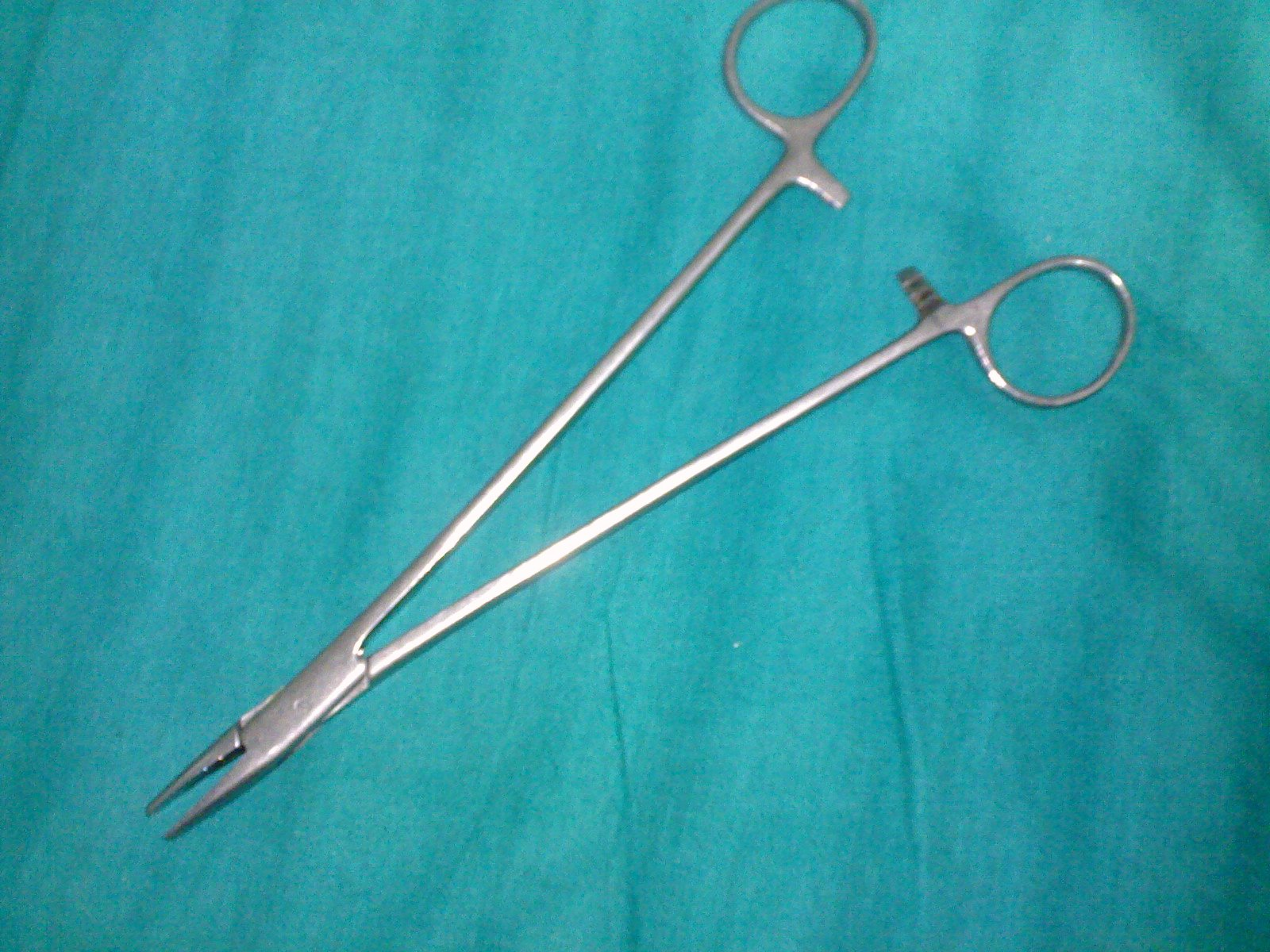
Straight needle holding forceps

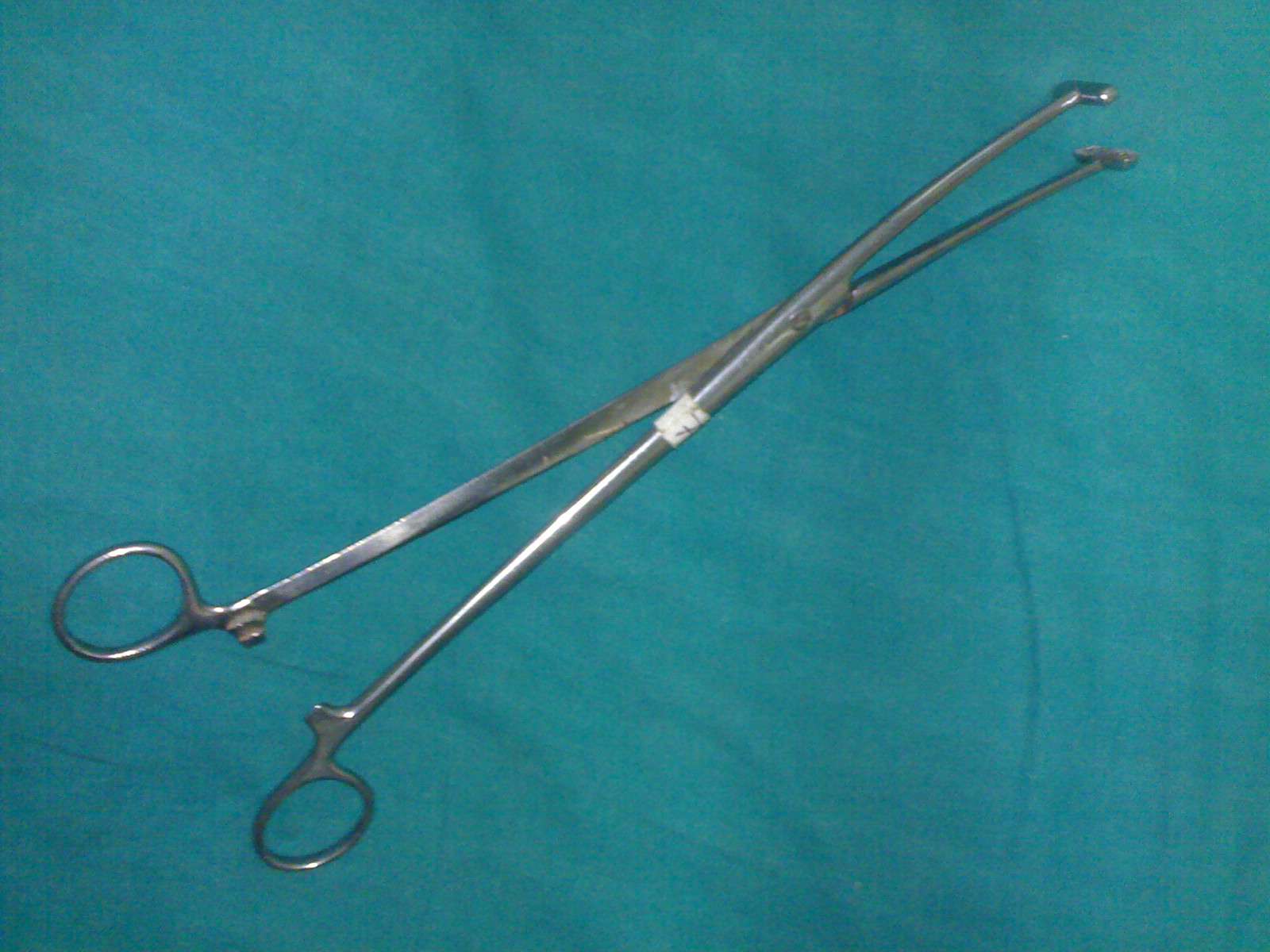
Willet's scalp traction forceps

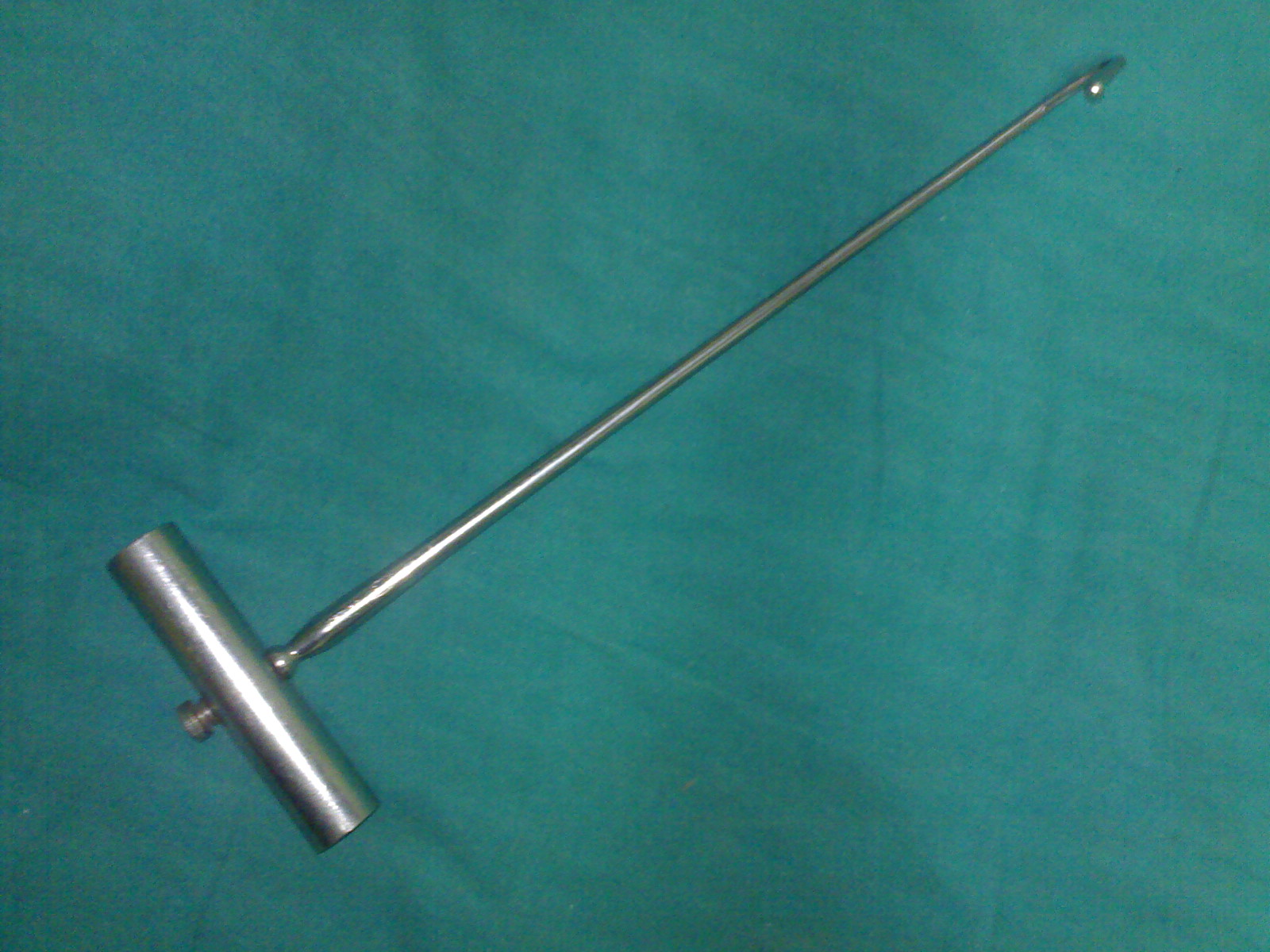
Jardine's decapitation hook with knife

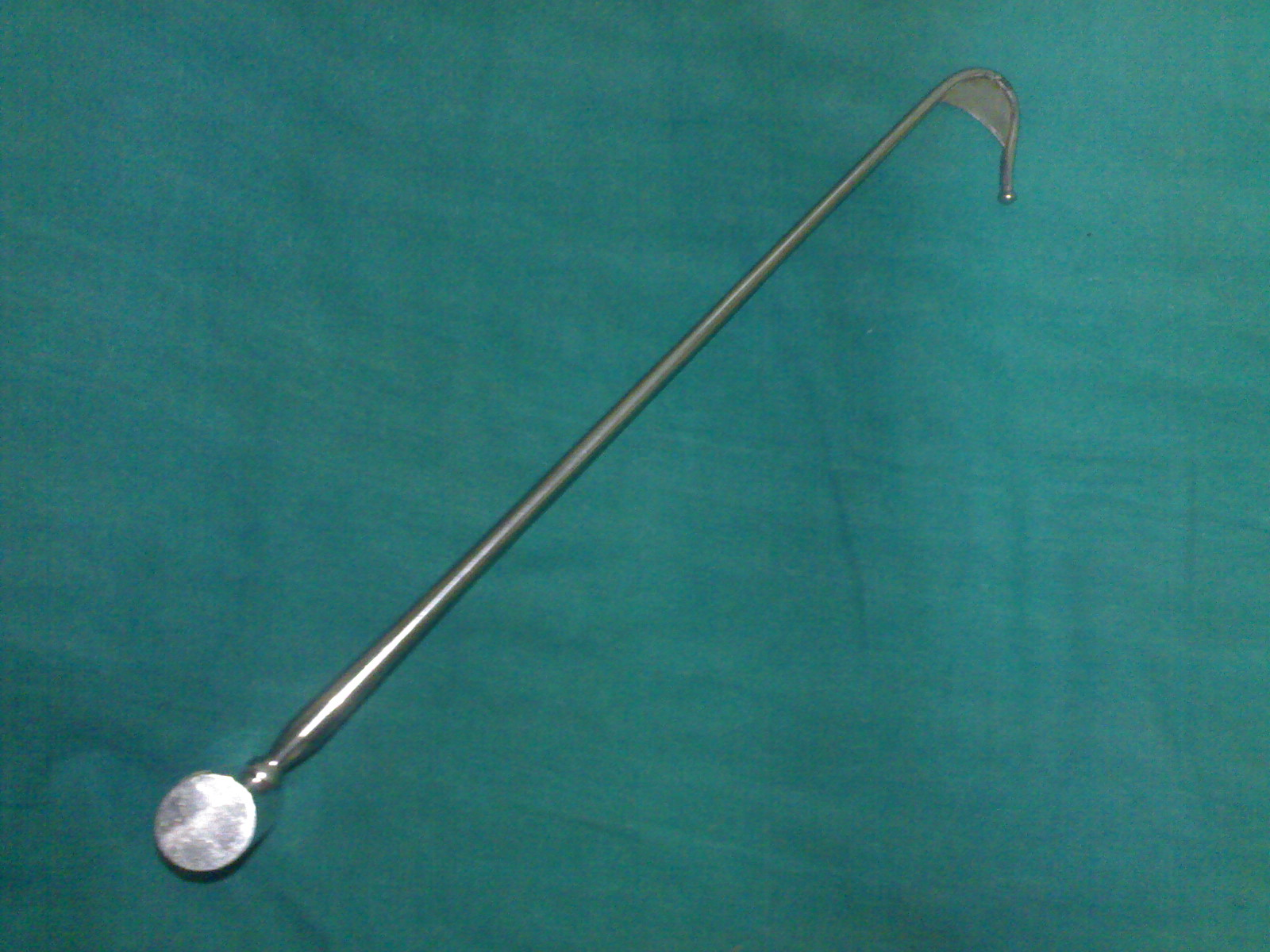
Jardine's decapitation hook with knife

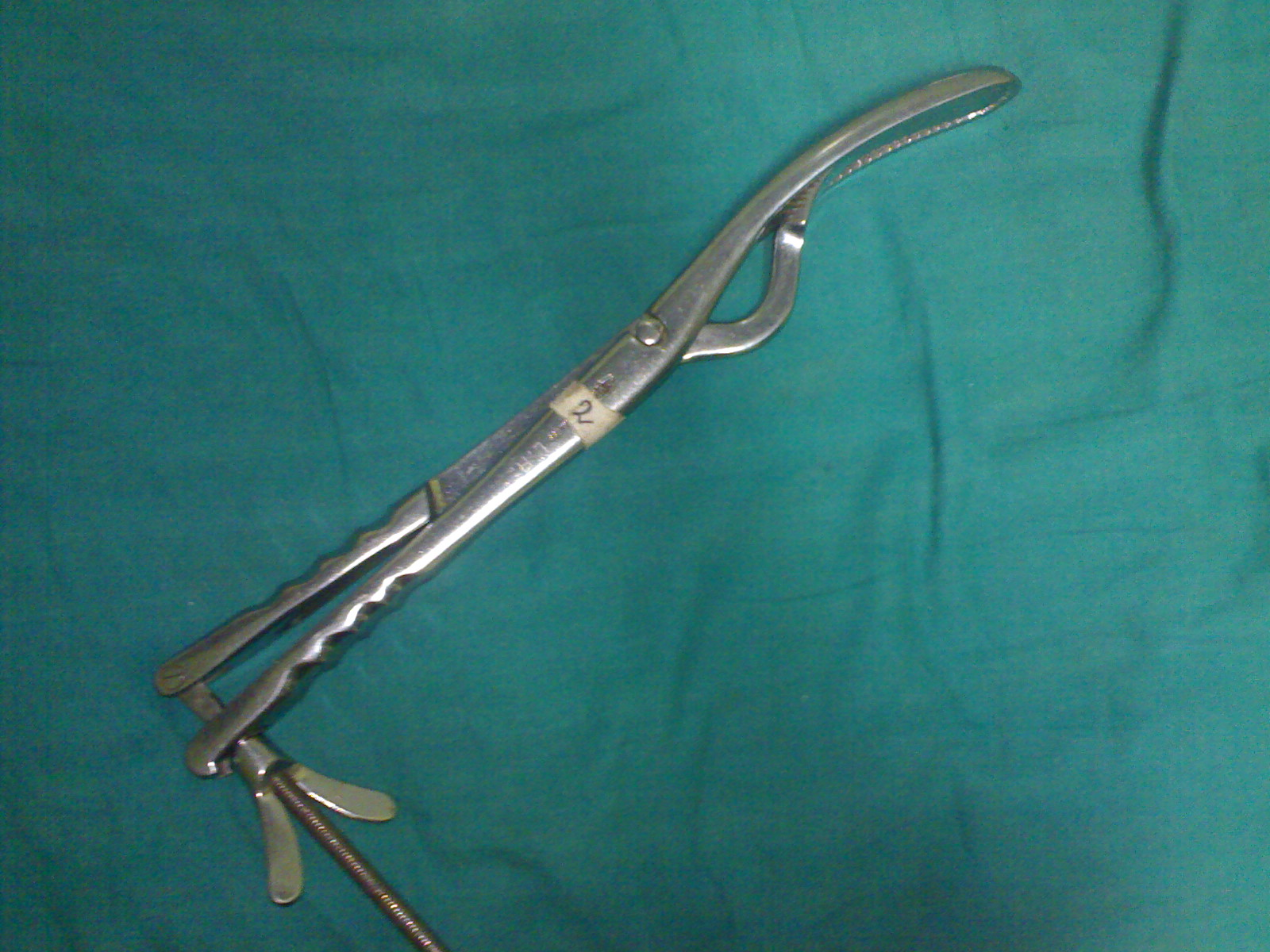
A cranioclast

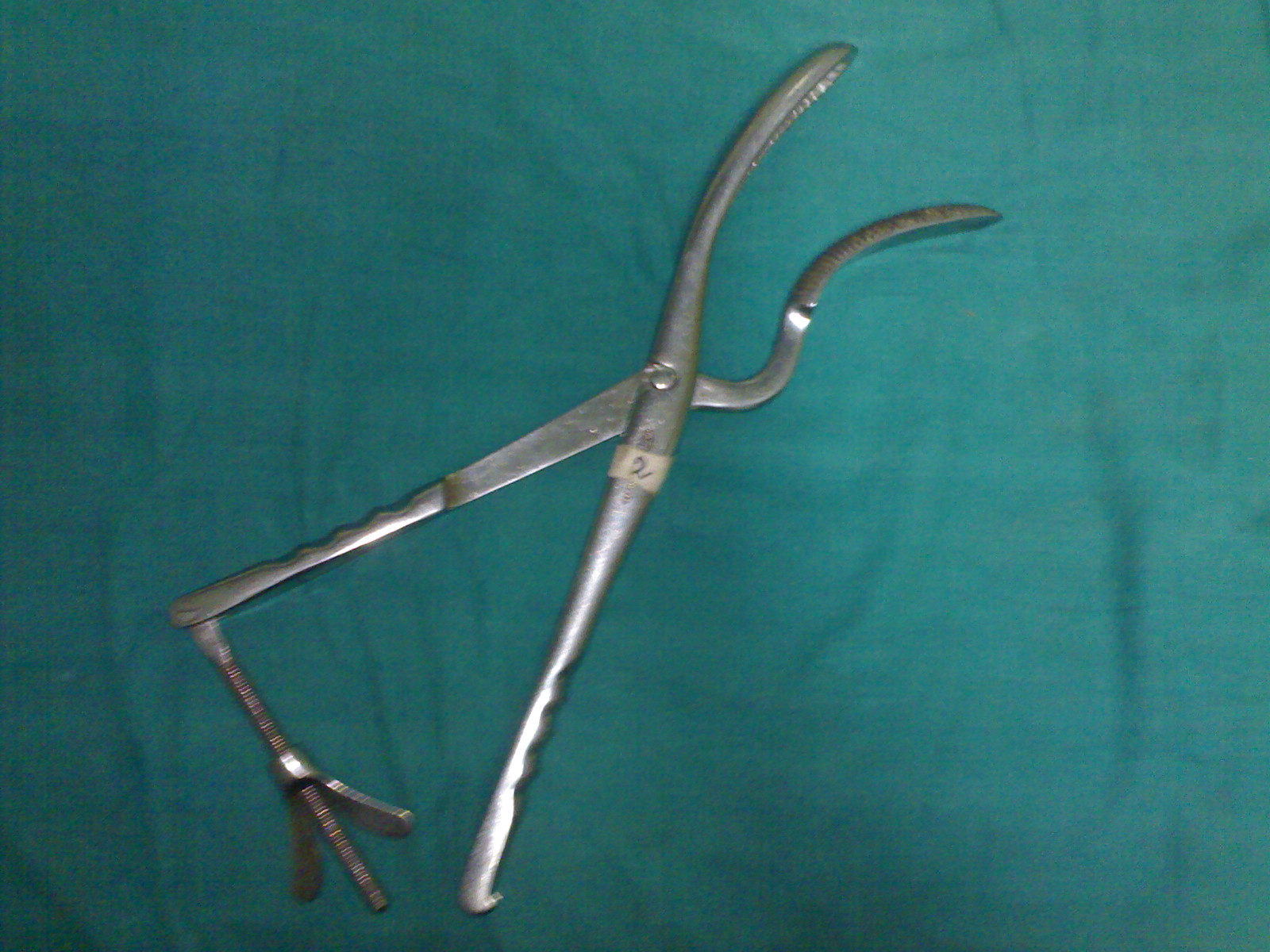
A cranioclast

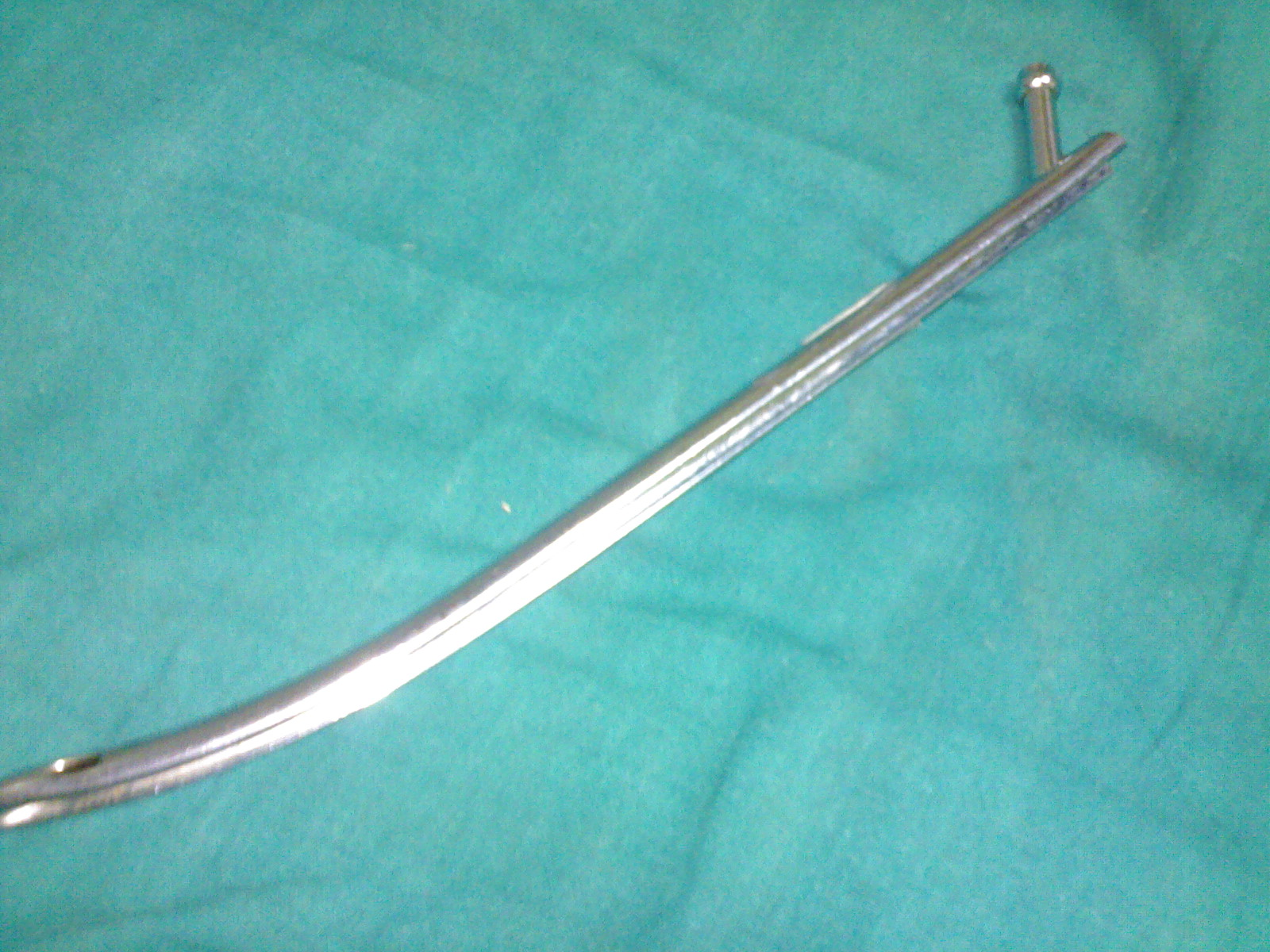
Budine's cannula

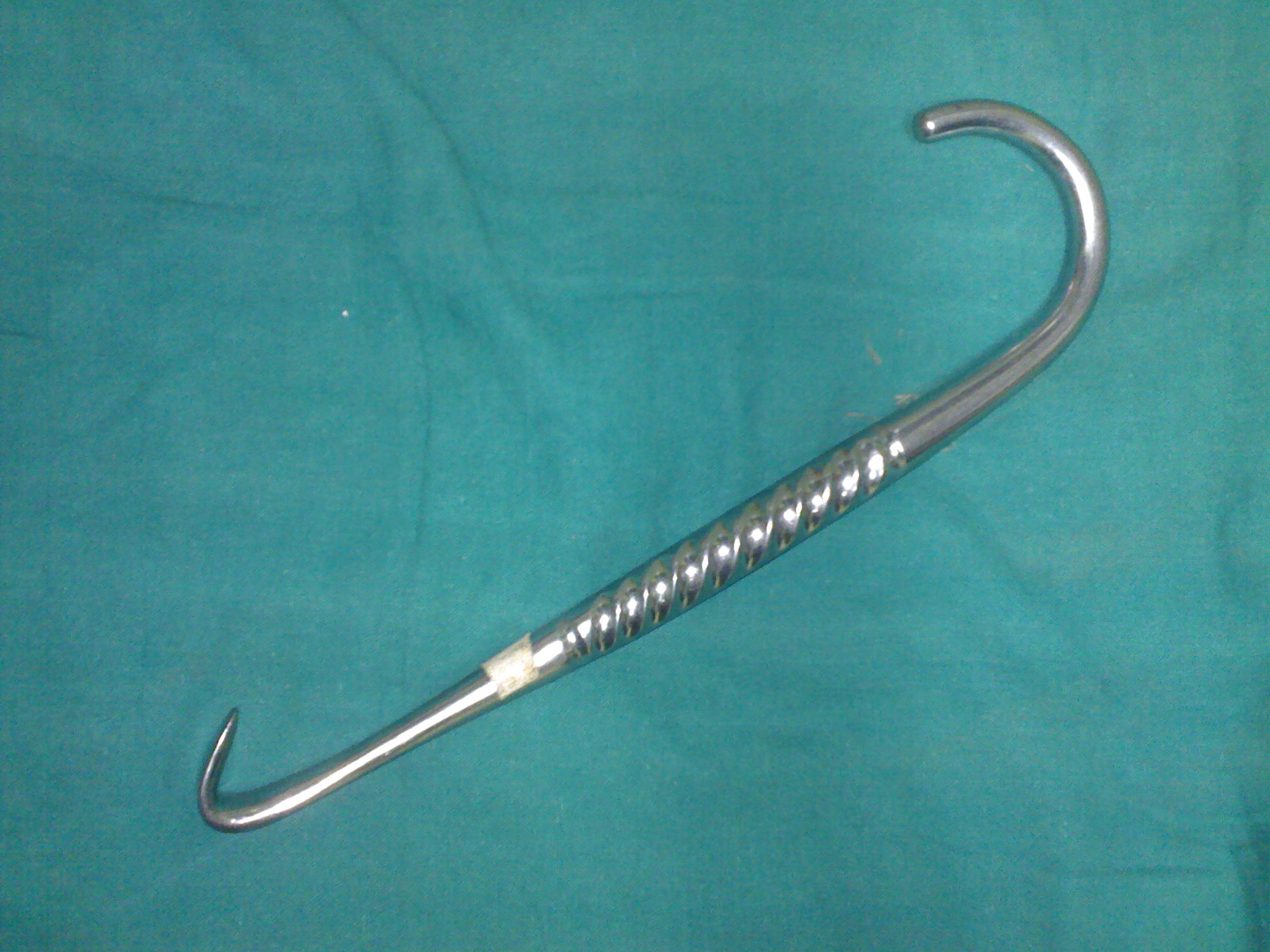
Hook with crochet

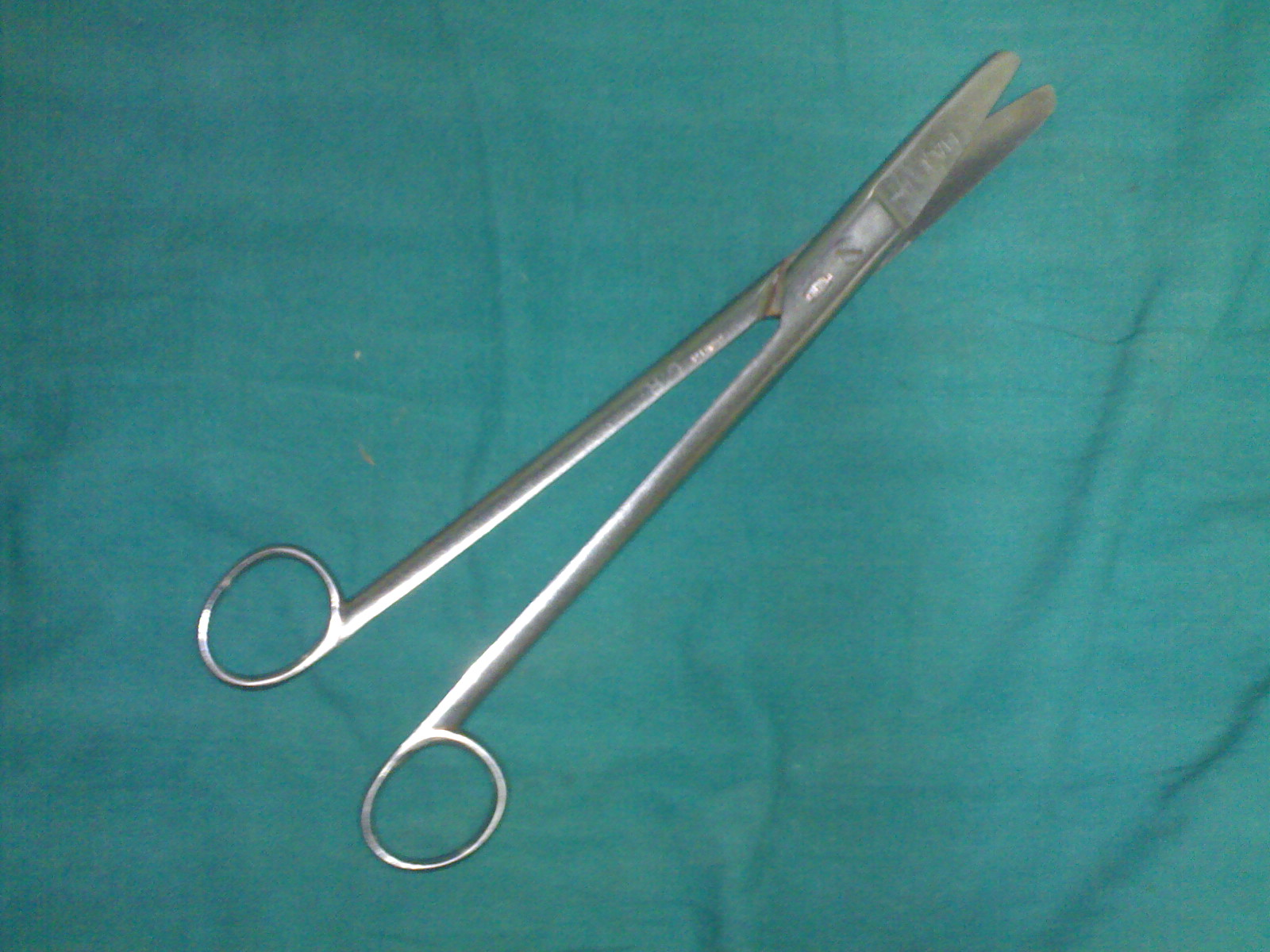
Embryo scissors

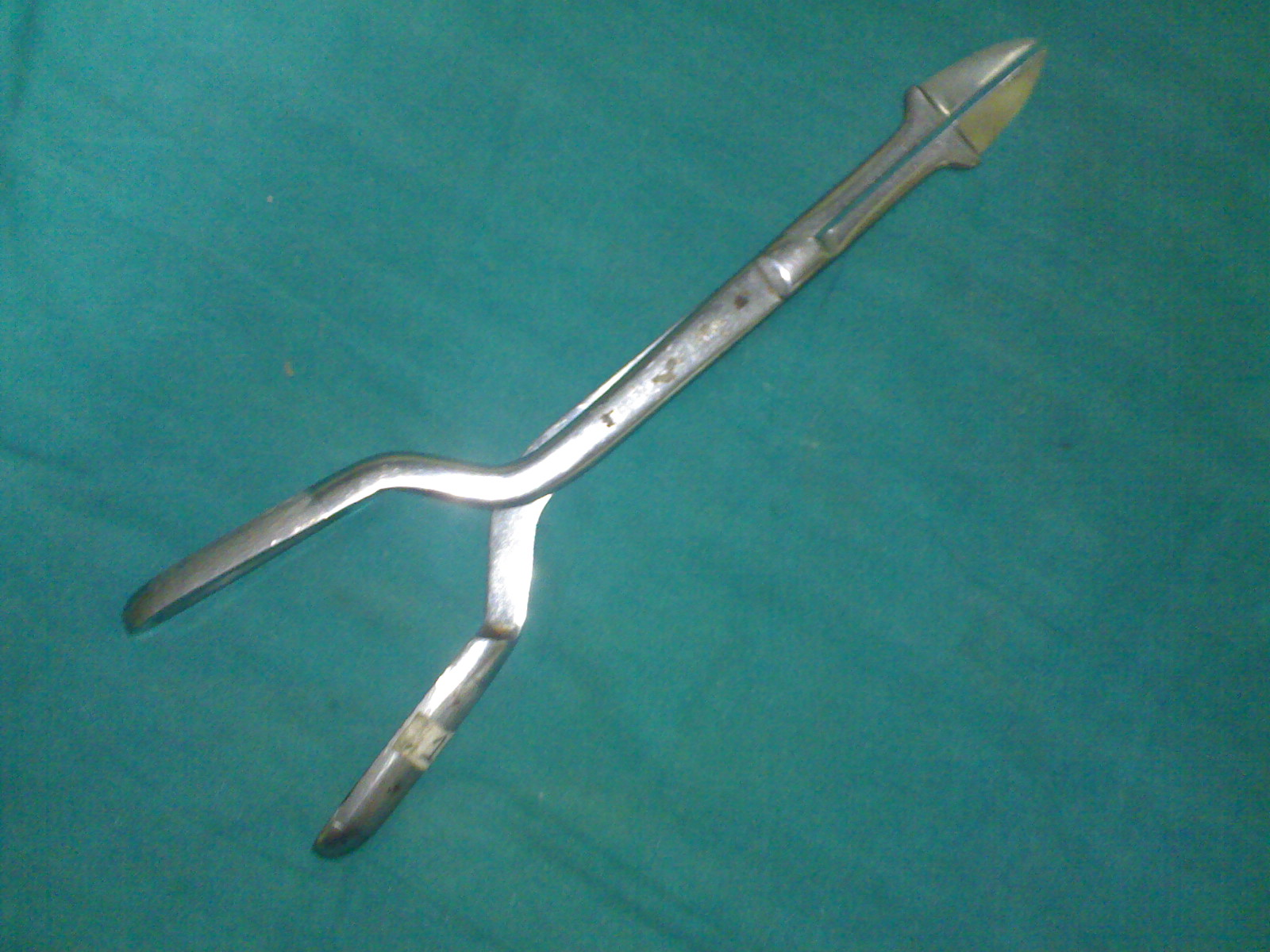
Oldham's perforator

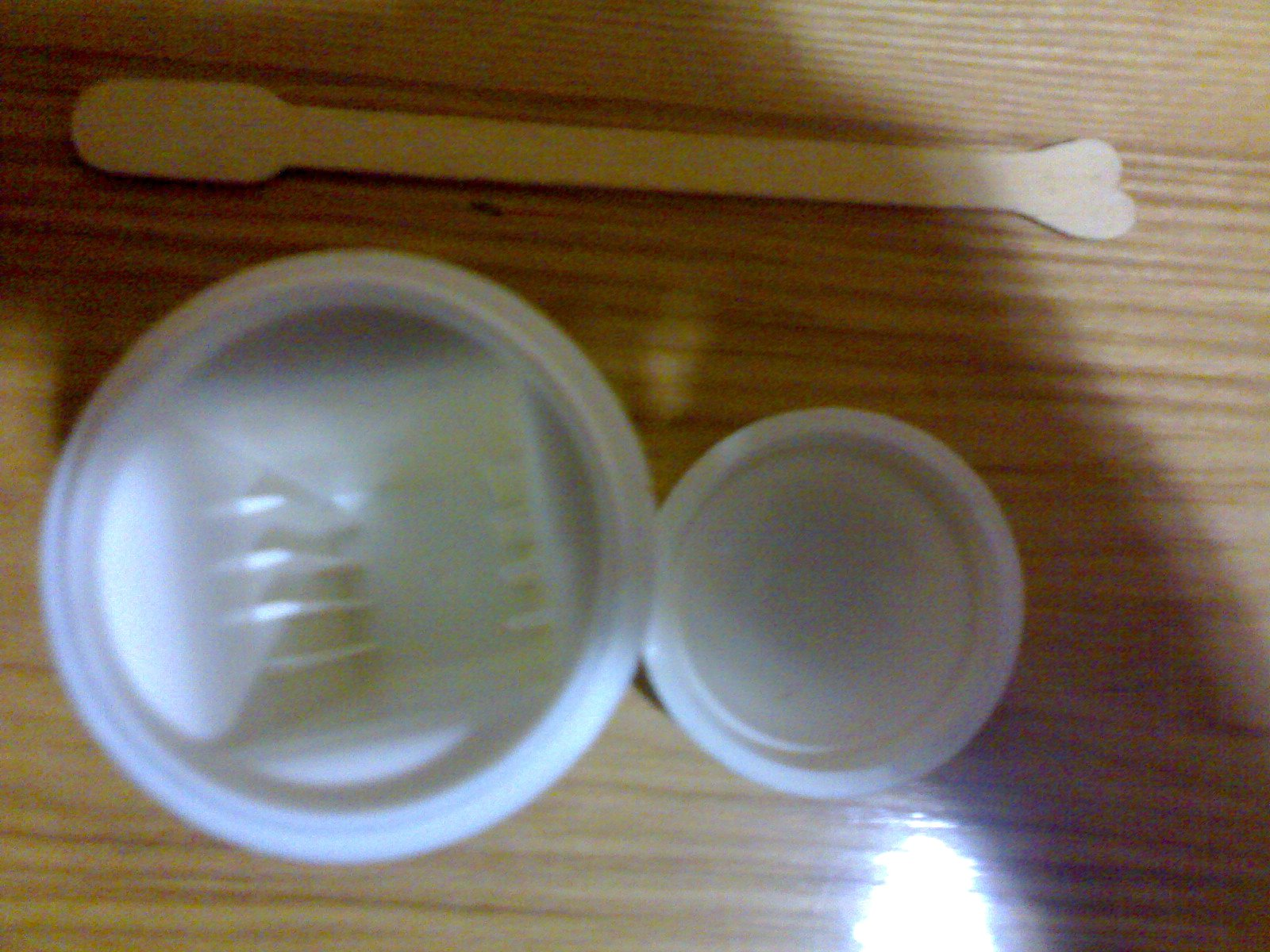
Ayre's spatula and Slide holding bottle(open) used for Papanicoulau smear

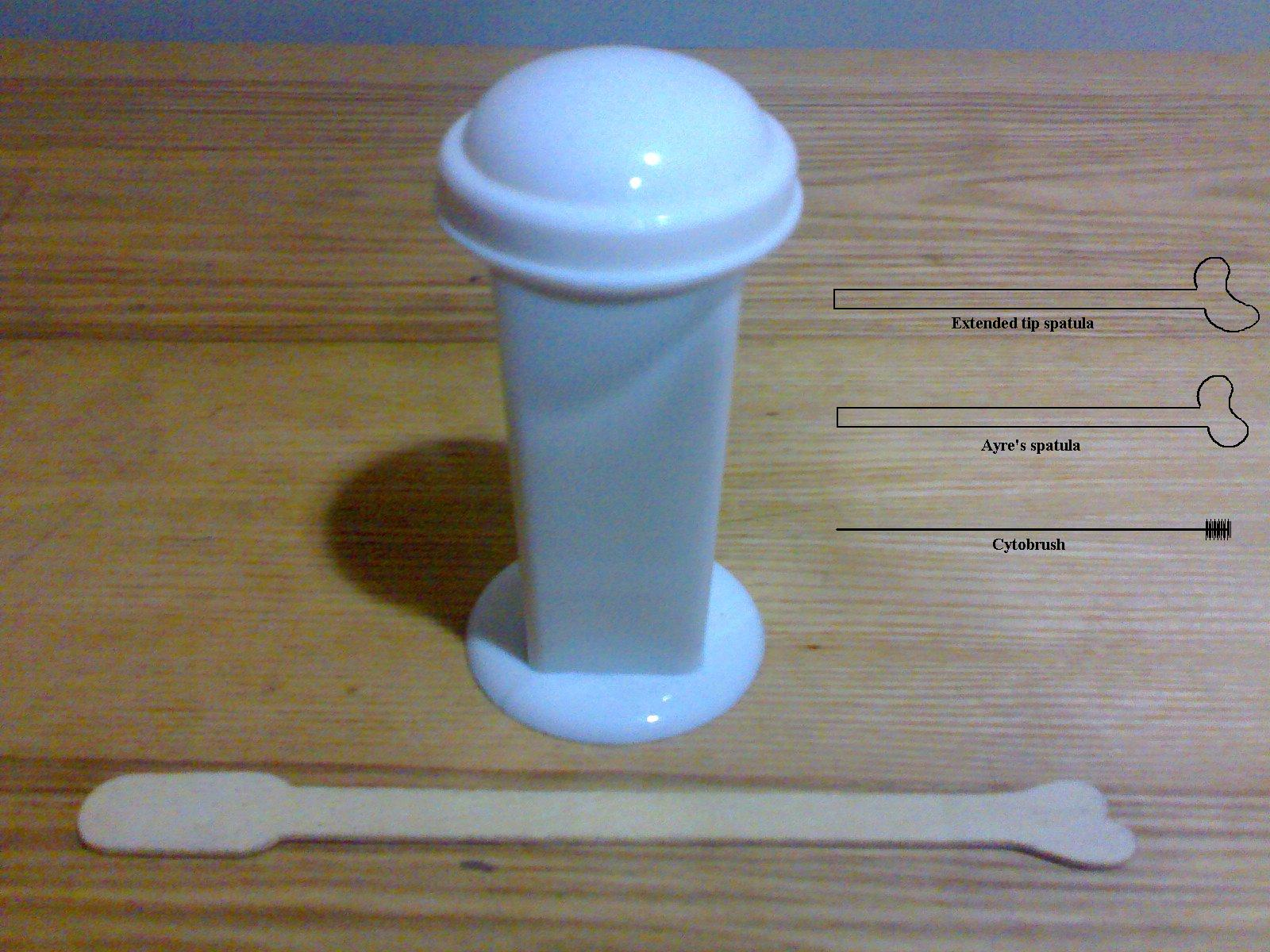
Ayre's spatula and Slide holding bottle - Koplick's jar (open) used for Papanicoulau smear

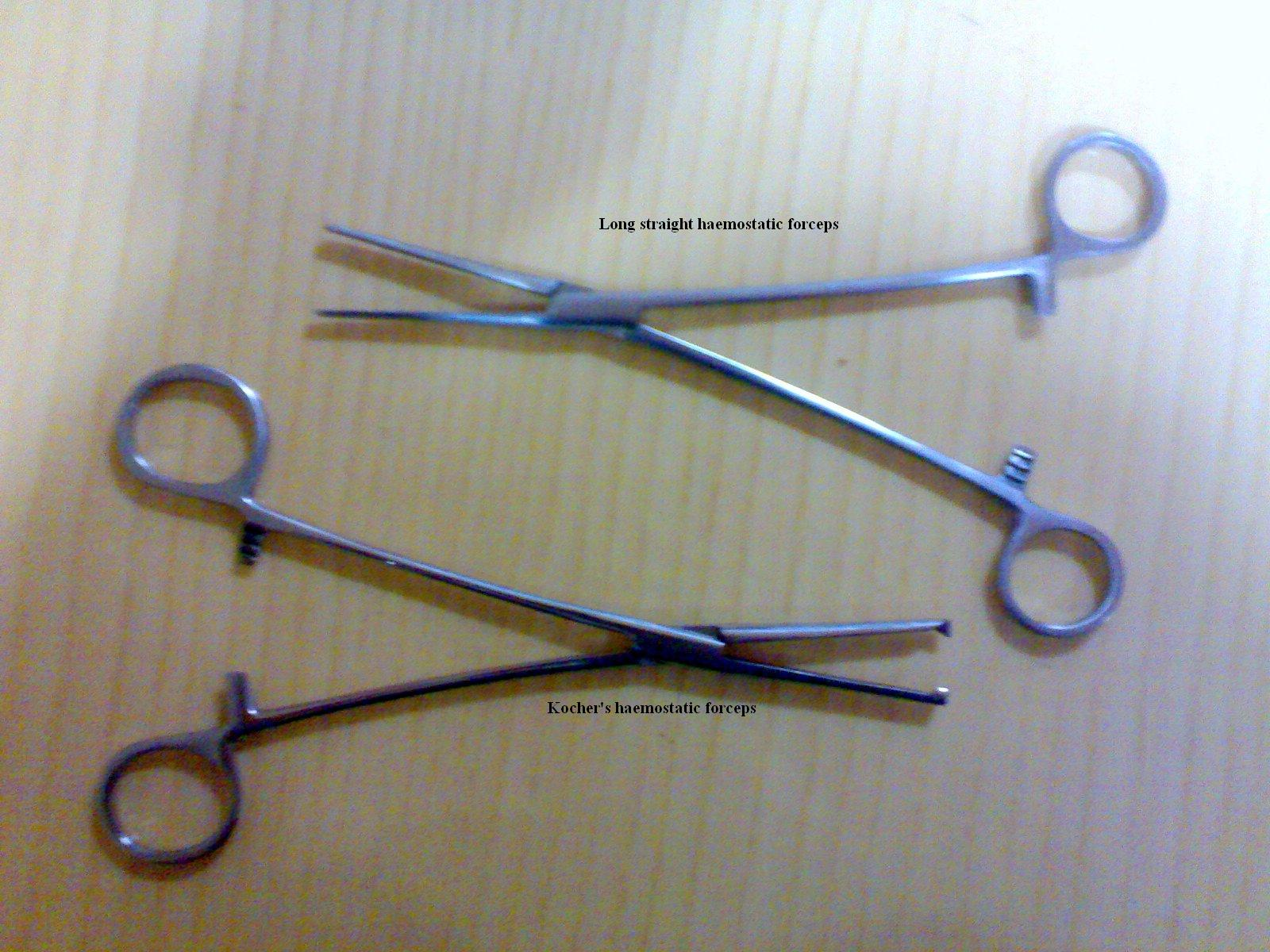
Upper-Long straight hemostatic forceps;Lower-Kocher's hemostatic forceps

== See also ==
- Instruments used in general medicine
- Medical procedure
- Women's health
