= Ferric subsulfate solution =

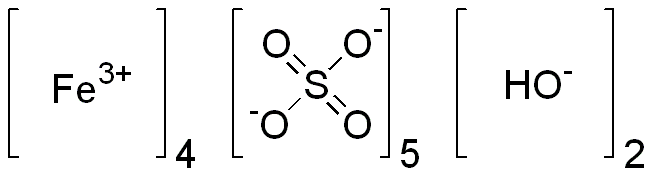

Clinical data
- Routes of administration: topical

Identifiers
- IUPAC name: Iron(+3) cation dihydroxide pentasulfate
- CAS Number: 1310-45-8
- PubChem CID: 159372
- ChemSpider: 140157
- UNII: 3QJ8WS6V8H
- CompTox Dashboard (EPA): DTXSID30893846
- ECHA InfoCard: 100.013.800

Chemical and physical data
- Formula: Fe_{4}H_{2}O_{22}S_{5}
- Molar mass: 737.67 g·mol^{−1}
- 3D model (JSmol): Interactive image
- SMILES: [OH-].[OH-].[O-]S(=O)(=O)[O-].[O-]S(=O)(=O)[O-].[O-]S(=O)(=O)[O-].[O-]S(=O)(=O)[O-].[O-]S(=O)(=O)[O-].[Fe+3].[Fe+3].[Fe+3].[Fe+3]
- InChI: InChI=1S/4Fe.5H2O4S.2H2O/c;;;;5*1-5(2,3)4;;/h;;;;5*(H2,1,2,3,4);2*1H2/q4*+3;;;;;;;/p-12; Key:GDPKWKCLDUOTMP-UHFFFAOYSA-B

Ferric subsulfate solution is a styptic or hemostatic agent used after superficial skin biopsies. Ferric subsulfate solution is also known as basic ferric sulfate solution or Monsel's solution. It has a recognised formula published in United States Pharmacopeia 29.

== Active ingredients ==
Ferric subsulfate solution is prepared from ferrous sulfate, sulfuric acid and nitric acid. It contains, per 100 mL, basic ferric sulfate equivalent to not less than 20g and not more than 22g of iron.

== Storage ==
Ferric subsulfate solution is generally stored in airtight containers at a temperature above 22 degrees Celsius. Crystallization may occur at temperatures below 22 degrees. Warming the solution may redissolve the crystals. The solution is typically protected from light.

== Other uses ==
Ferric subsulfate (also known as Monsel's solution) is often used by Jewish burial societies (chevra kadisha) to stop post-mortem bleeding. Since Jewish burial does not allow any external skin adhesives such as bandages, tape, glue or resin, ferric subsulfate is an effective way to stop post-mortem bleeding. Most post-mortem bleeding stems from surgery, emergency room situations, autopsies or blood which may result when removing IV lines during Jewish burial preparation. A piece of cotton, or Q-tip, soaked with this solution is pressed against the open wound and held for a few seconds. This is usually enough time for the seal to take effect. For more severe cases, such as arterial lines, if the line is still inside, the solution can be inserted directly into the IV line.

== Brand names ==
AstrinGyn by CooperSurgical is a thickened and specially modified gel formulation.

== History ==
It was invented in the late 1840s by Leon Monsel (March 13, 1816 – April 15, 1878), a French military pharmacist. His invention soon became a standard in the French Corps, which saved many lives during battles of the French Army.
