= Stirrup (disambiguation) =

A stirrup is a metal loop supporting the foot, fastened to a saddle on a riding animal. Stirrup may also refer to:

- Baseball stirrups, a type of socks worn by baseball players
- the braces supporting the lithotomy position utilised in medical examinations such as a pelvic exam
- A clamp (tool) or support in the shape of a stirrup
- Rebar bent in a loop and used to reinforce concrete
- The stapes, a bone of the ear resembling a stirrup
- Stirrup pants, a form of leggings with a strap beneath the arch of the foot

== See also ==
- Jock Stirrup, nickname of Britain's Air Chief Marshal Sir Graham Eric Stirrup
- Frank Stirrup, English rugby league footballer of the 1950s and 1960s
- Stirrup cup
- Stirrup jar, a two-handled amphora whose opposing handles connect the aperture to the sides of the vessel
- Stirrup shell, a species of bivalve
- Stirrup spout vessel, a type of ceramic vessel used by indigenous cultures of South America
- Stir-up Sunday, in religion
- Stir (disambiguation)
