= Pelvic examination =

Physical medical examination

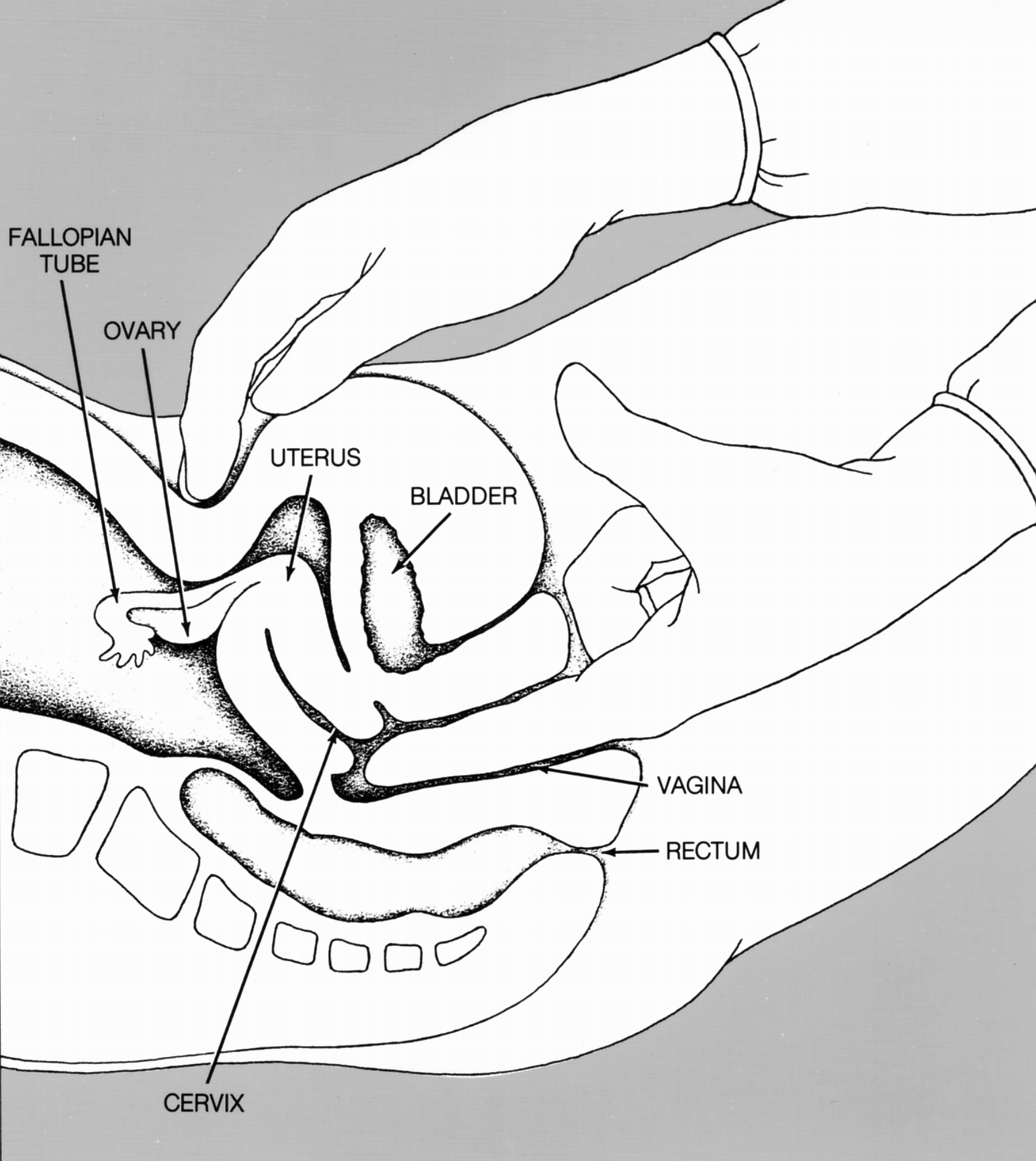
- Line drawing showing bimanual palpation as part of a pelvic exam
- Specialty: Gynaecology
- ICD-9-CM: 89.26

A pelvic examination is the physical examination of the external and internal female pelvic organs. It is frequently used in gynecology for the evaluation of symptoms affecting the female reproductive and urinary tract, such as pain, bleeding, discharge, urinary incontinence, or trauma (e.g. sexual assault). It can also be used to assess a woman's anatomy in preparation for procedures. The exam can be done awake in the clinic and emergency department, or under anesthesia in the operating room. The most commonly performed components of the exam are 1) the external exam, to evaluate the vulva 2) the internal exam with palpation (commonly called the bimanual exam) to examine the uterus, ovaries, and structures adjacent to the uterus (adnexae) and 3) the internal exam using a speculum to visualize the vaginal walls and cervix. During the pelvic exam, sample of cells and fluids may be collected to screen for sexually transmitted infections or cancer (the Pap test).

Some clinicians perform a pelvic exam as part of routine preventive care. However, in 2014, the American College of Physicians published guidelines against routine pelvic examination in adult women who are not pregnant and lack symptoms, with the exception of pelvic exams done as part of cervical cancer screening.

== Medical guidelines ==
Traditionally in the field of gynecology, the benefits of routine pelvic examinations were assumed, and the exam was a recommended part of the initial gynecology visit, annual visits, and as needed for treatment. In 2014, the American College of Physicians (ACP) published a review of the benefits and the risks of the exam and issued a guideline that recommended against performing this examination to screen for conditions in asymptomatic, nonpregnant, adult women, concluding that the potential harms outweighed the demonstrated benefits and that screening pelvic exams in asymptomatic women did not reduce mortality or morbidity rates. The guideline did not consider the necessity or frequency of Pap smears. The ACP guideline concluded that there was no evidence that the exam in asymptomatic adult women reduced morbidity or mortality, and that there were no studies that addressed the exam's diagnostic accuracy for identifying specific gynecologic conditions. The guideline concluded that there was evidence of harm, including fear, embarrassment, pain, discomfort and unnecessary surgery. This was a strong recommendation, based on moderate-quality evidence. In 2018, the American College of Obstetricians and Gynecologists (ACOG) issued a committee opinion that pelvic exams should be performed for 1) symptoms of gynecologic disease, 2) screening for cervical dysplasia, or 3) management of gynecologic disorders or malignancy, using shared decision-making with the patient. ACOG acknowledged that given changes in screening recommendations and an assessment of harms vs benefits as reviewed by the US Preventive Services Task Force, re-evaluation of routine screening pelvic examination for asymptomatic, non-pregnant women with average risk for gynecologic disease was indicated. A 2020 update of the literature by the US Preventive Services Task Force concluded that the evidence remained insufficient to assess the balance of benefits and harms of screening pelvic examinations in asymptomatic women.

Annual "well-woman visits" are an occasion for gynecologists to identify health risks for women; ACOG has noted that these visits may also include clinical breast examinations, immunizations, contraceptive care discussions, and preventive health care counseling. ACOG reinforced the potential value of pelvic examinations in allowing clinicians to explain a patient's anatomy, reassure her of normalcy, and answer specific questions, thus establishing open communication between patient and clinician.

== Preparation, communication, and trauma-informed care ==
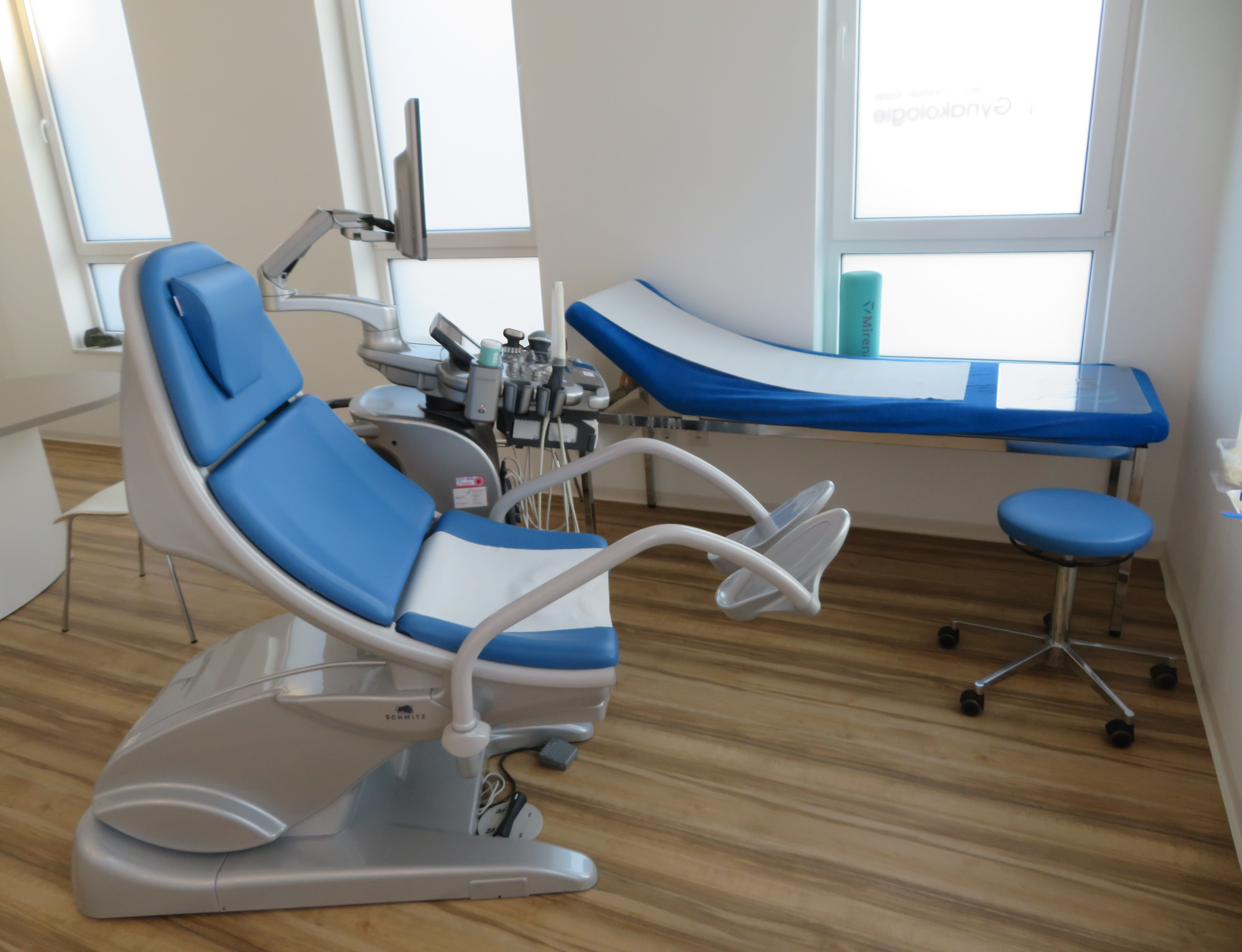
Chair for gynaecological examinations. Next to the chair a sonography device and screen.

The examination can be emotionally and physically uncomfortable for women. Preparation, good communication, thoughtful technique, and trauma-informed care can help mitigate this discomfort.

Prior to the exam, before the patient is undressed and lying on the examination table or chair, examiners should ask the patient if she has had a pelvic exam in the past and whether she has any questions or concerns about the exam. Women may be concerned about pain, or they may be embarrassed about the examination of sensitive areas of the body. They may have experienced sexual assault or negative experiences with pelvic examination in the past, which may lead to the exam triggering strong emotional and physical symptoms. Additionally, patients may have concern about odor or menstruation during exam, neither of which should impact the examiner's ability to perform a thorough, respectful exam. Patients generally prefer to be asked about past experiences and are often helpful in suggesting ways to mitigate the discomfort of the exam. Prior to the exam, the examiner should offer to show the patient models or diagrams of the pelvic anatomy and any instruments that will be used during the exam.

Careful preparation is helpful for an efficient and comfortable exam. Prior to asking the patient to position herself on the exam table or chair for examination, the examiner should collect all the instruments needed for the exam and any planned procedures, including the speculum, light source, lubricant, gloves, drapes, and specimen collection media. Warming the speculum with warm tap water or keeping the speculum in a warmer will also increase comfort. The patient should be given the opportunity to have a chaperone or support person in the room during the exam. In general, male examiners should always be accompanied by a female chaperone.

The examiner should explain each step of the exam and its purpose, should address and normalize any concerns, should assert that the patient has full control over the exam, and should ask permission before each step of the exam. The examiner should keep as much of the patient's body covered as possible during the exam. Relaxation of the pelvic muscles can reduce discomfort during the exam. Rather than telling the patient to "relax", which can trigger strong emotions for women who are survivors of assault, patients can be told to breathe slowly and deeply into their abdomens, or which is a more instructive way of describing how to relax the pelvic muscles.

The patient should be informed that she can stop the procedure at any time. If the patient does not want to continue the exam, the examiner should stop, speak with the patient about her concerns and how to mitigate them, and only continue when the patient is ready to do so. In 2024, the US Department of Health and Human Services banned pelvic exams (and breast, prostate and rectal exams) without written informed consent, when such exams are done by medical students, nurse practitioners, or physician assistants for “educational and training purposes”.

== External examination ==
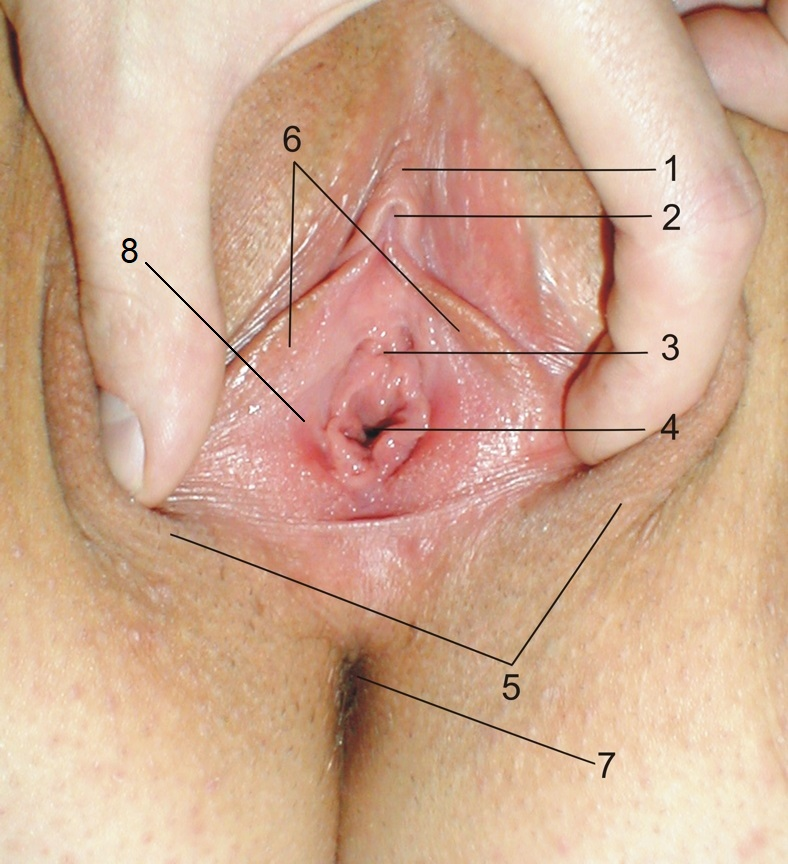
An image that shows the introitus (the opening of the vagina) in relation to its surrounding structures, when the labia are displaced by the individual's own fingers. Individual structures include: 1. Clitoral hood 2. Clitoral glans (clitoris) 3. Urethra 4. Vaginal opening 5. Labia majora 6. Labia minora 7. Anus

The pelvic exam begins with a discussion as described above, and an explanation of the procedure. The patient is asked to put on an examination gown, get on the examination table, and lie on her back with her feet in footrests. Sliding down toward the end of the table is the best position for the clinician to do a visual examination. A pelvic exam begins with an assessment of the reproductive organs that can be seen without the use of a speculum. Many women may want to 'prepare' for the procedure. One possible reason for delaying an exam is if it is to be done during menstruation, but this is a preference of some patients and not a requirement of the clinician. The clinician may want to perform pelvic examination and assessment of the vagina because there are unexplained symptoms of vaginal discharge, pelvic pain, unexpected bleeding, or urinary problems.

The typical external examination begins with making sure that the patient is in a comfortable position and her privacy respected.

- In some instances, different positioning and assistance may be required to keep tissue from blocking the view of the perineal area.
- The pubic hair is inspected for pubic lice and hair growth patterns. Sparse hair patterns can exist in older and in some Asian patients.
- The labia majora are evaluated. Their position and symmetry are assessed. The expected finding in older patients is that the labia majora can be thinner and smaller. The examiner is looking for ulcers, inflammation, warts and rashes. If drainage is present from these structures, its color, location and other characteristics are noted. Infection control is accomplished by frequent glove changes.
- The labia minora are then evaluated. They should appear moist, smooth in texture and pink. The presence of tearing, inflammation and swelling is noted. Thinner and smaller labia minora are an expected finding in older patients.
- The clitoris is assessed for size, position, symmetry, and inflammation.
- The urethral opening is inspected. No urine should leak when the patient is asked to cough. Urine leakage may indicate stress incontinence and the weakening of pelvic structures. The opening should be midline, pink, and smooth. The presence of inflammation or discharge may indicate an infection. Excoriation can be present in obese patients due to urinary incontinence.
- The vaginal opening is inspected for position, presence of the hymen, and shape. The examiner should look for the presence of bruising, tearing, inflammation and discharge. Pelvic examinations are usually procedures that are designed to obtain objective, measurable descriptions of what is observed. If sexual abuse is suspected, questions regarding this are discussed after the examination and not during it. When the patient is requested to 'bear down', the presence of prolapsed structures such as the bladder (cystocele), rectum (rectocele) or uterus are documented. Prolapsed structures can appear when abdominal pressure increases or they can protrude without bearing down.
- The perineum, the space between the vagina and the anus, is inspected. It should be smooth, firm, and free of disease. Scars from episiotomies are visible on women who have had the procedure during childbirth.
- The anus is assessed for lesions, inflammation or trauma. It should appear dark, continuous and moist. In some patients, excoriation may be present, and can be a sign of fecal incontinence.

== Internal examination ==
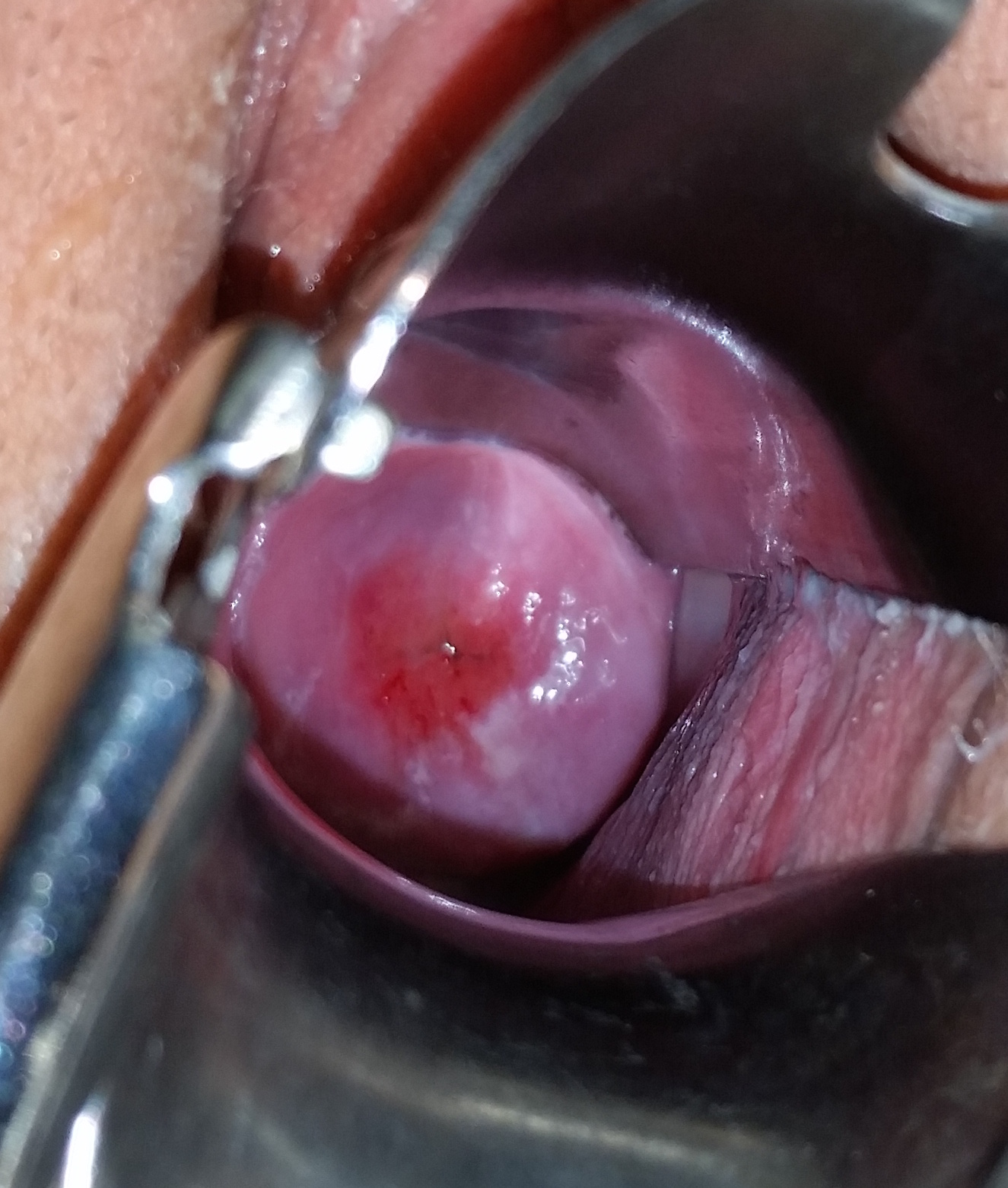
A speculum exam showing the ectocervix of a postmenarchal, nulliparous woman

Before inserting the speculum, the vaginal wall, urethra, Skene's glands and Bartholin's glands are palpated through the vaginal wall. During the internal exam, the examiner describes the procedure while doing the assessment, making sure that the patient can anticipate where she will feel the palpations.

- The patient is first informed that the examiner will insert their finger into the vagina. The palpation of the vagina is done by evaluating the condition of the vaginal walls. These should feel smooth, consistent and soft. The rugae can also be assessed by palpation.
- The patient is again asked to bear down while the examiner continues the internal examination. The presence of bulging is assessed.
- The position of the urethra is assessed by palpation with a finger through the vaginal wall.
- The Skene's glands, located on each side of the urethra, are palpated to produce secretion from the glands.
- The Bartholin glands are also assessed internally by gently squeezing them with one finger placed externally, on the posterior labia majora and the other finger in the vagina.

At this point of the pelvic exam, the examiner will insert the speculum to visualize other internal structures: the cervix, uterus, and ovaries. If this is the first pelvic exam of the patient, the examiner will show the speculum to the patient, explain its use and answer any questions.

- The appropriate sized speculum is selected. The speculum is slowly inserted in its collapsed state at a 45-degree angle to match the slope of the vagina. The blades are then expanded until the cervix comes into view. If the speculum is transparent, the vaginal walls can be seen.
- The cervix is then assessed. It should look moist, round, pink, and centered to the middle. The secretions of the cervix should be clear or whitish with no odor. The presence or absence of polyps, ulcers, and inflammation are noted.
- A swab or cytobrush will be used to collect or scrape cervical cells off of the surface of the cervix to be evaluated for changes. Other vaginal swabs can be taken at this time to test for sexually transmitted infections.

== Bimanual examination ==
The bimanual component of the pelvic examination allows the examiner to feel ("palpate" in medical terms) the structures of the pelvis, including the vagina, cervix, uterus, and adnexae (structures adjacent to the uterus, which include the ovaries and any adnexal masses). The bimanual exam traditionally occurs after the speculum is removed. The examiner explains this part of the exam. From a standing position, the examiner typically applies lubricant to the fingers of the glove of their dominant hand, and the index finger or index finger and middle finger are gently inserted into the vagina. The examiner's opposite hand is place on the patient's abdomen to allow palpation of the pelvic structures; thus the exam is termed a "bimanual: examination". A systematic exam of the pelvic structures allows an assessment of the vaginal introitus (opening), pelvic floor muscles, bladder, rectum, cervix, and the area posterior to the uterus; this portion of the exam is particularly helpful for individuals with pelvic pain, as it allows an assessment of tenderness and an anatomic source of pain. In assessing the uterus, elevation of cervix with the vaginal hand allows palpation of the uterus above the pubic symphysis with the opposite hand, and the size, shape, mobility, contour, consistency, and position of the uterus can be determined. Observing the patient's face during this exam can provide information about the additional characteristic of uterine tenderness, and the patient can also provide verbal feedback. The adnexal structures are similarly palpated, noting any enlargement of the ovaries and if present, the size, shape, mobility, consistency, and tenderness of ovarian/adnexal masses. Normally Fallopian tubes are not palpable.

An additional component of the pelvic examination may include recto-vaginal examination. The examiner puts on a clean glove, and using sufficient lubricant, places the index finger within the vagina and the middle finger within the rectum. This component of the exam assesses rectal tone and lesions such as hemorrhoids, anal fissures, rectal polyps, or masses including carcinoma. It also allows palpation of the recto-vaginal septum, the intra-abdominal area posterior to the uterus (the cul-de-sac or pouch of Douglas), and the adnexal. Nodularity posterior to the uterus along the uterosacral ligaments has been associated with pelvic endometriosis as well as implants of ovarian cancer.

After completion of the exam, the examiner discards their gloves, washes their hands, assists the patient in sitting up, and describes their findings on the examination.

== During pregnancy ==
Prenatal care includes pelvic exams during the pregnancy.

The pelvic exam during pregnancy is similar to the exam for non-pregnant women; however, more attention is given to the uterus and cervix. The size of the uterus is assessed at the initial visit, and the growth of the uterus is assessed at subsequent visits. In the first trimester the uterine size can be assessed on bimanual examination. Subsequently, beyond the 12th week of gestation, the uterus can be felt above the pubic bone, and abdominal examinations assess growth. Attention is given to the vulva to assess any perineal abnormalities. A speculum exam is typically performed at the initial visit; the cervix typically appears bluish, which is a sign of increased blood flow. A Pap test may be performed according to guidelines, and testing for Neisseria gonorrhea and Chlamydia trachomatis may be performed as indicated. A bimanual examination during early pregnancy will reveal that the uterus is enlarged, softened and globular; the external os may be dilated, but the internal os is typically closed. The structures adjacent to the uterus will be assessed, along with the size and shape of the bony pelvis. As the due date approaches, assessment of the cervix with bimanual examwill indicate whether the cervix has begun to dilate and soften.

== See also ==
- Well-woman examination
- Pap test
- Trauma-Informed Care
