= Lesbian Health Initiative of Houston =

American nonprofit organization

- Founded at: Houston, Texas, United States
- Type: 501(c)(3) organization
- Purpose: LGBT healthcare
- Headquarters: Houston, Texas, United States
- Region served: Houston and Harris County, Texas
- Interim executive director: Aurora Harris
- Website: www.lhihouston.org

The Lesbian Health Initiative of Houston, also known simply as Lesbian Health Initiative or LHI, is a 501(c)(3) nonprofit organization in Houston, Texas, United States. LHI focuses on advocating for and promoting health and wellness among LGBTQ women and transgender men. It is certified by CenterLink.

== Description and mission ==
The LHI defines its mission as consisting of access, education, and advocacy. At its headquarters, LHI offers physical and mental health services, civic engagement and medical training programs, and a specialized program for LGBT senior citizens. It also provides outreach to the medical community and runs a regular publication (titled ACCESS) and speaking events. Additionally, LHI partners with several other organizations to advocate for LGBT health, including the Breast Health Collaborative of Texas, Comprehensive Cancer Control Program, Gateway to Care, Harris County Healthcare Alliance, LINCC, National Coalition for LGBT Health, One Voice Texas, and Texas Women's Health Initiative. Other partners include Planned Parenthood and Memorial Hermann–Texas Medical Center.

The center hosts a biannual Health Fair, which provides free medical services to the LGBT community, including mammograms, blood work, flu shots, pap tests, bone density tests, well-woman examinations, and heart screenings. To offer medical services, the LHI partners with Caremark Rx, Legacy Community Health Services, M.D. Anderson Cancer Center, Montrose Center, The Rose, Baylor St. Luke's Medical Center, and The Texas Heart Institute.

== History ==
LHI was established in 1992 in Houston, Texas, by a group of lesbian women who were working in medical services. By that time, new medical research had revealed lesbians were at higher risk of breast and cervical cancer than their straight counterparts. It became a 501(c)(3) organization in 1994. The same year, LHI created a study called the Houston Area Health Care Needs Assessment for LGBT Women, to assess the issues LHI would address. The study found that 1 in 4 LGBT women had barriers that restricted their access to medical care, ranging from finances to discrimination, and the same number of women were assumed heterosexual by healthcare providers. 25% of these women also reported signs of cancer within the previous year before the study. Additionally, trends indicated high stress, alcohol consumption, and tobacco usage levels among these women, and indicated a desire among the community for better access to adequate healthcare.

LHI's Health Fair began in 1996 and became biannual in 2005. In 2011, LHI established its advocacy and education programs. In 2015 and 2016, LHI partnered with other organizations to fuel an assessment, titled the State of Health in Houston/Harris County, to establish demographic data on the Houston LGBT community's health and wellbeing. The study affirmed the 1994 study's data: demographic data indicated that about half of the Texas LGBT population was uninsured, encountered barriers to adequate healthcare, and had higher rates and risk of homelessness and tobacco usage. Additionally, it addressed the large data gap surrounding the LGBT community's welfare and the negative consequences it had on public health and the economy. They advocated for the Texas Department of State Health Services to adapt its BRFSS to include an LGBT module in 2015.

== See also ==
- Healthcare and the LGBT community
