= Cervicography =

- Purpose: Test for cervical cancer (screening)

Cervicography is a diagnostic medical procedure in which a non-physician takes pictures of the cervix and submits them to a physician for interpretation. Other related procedures are speculoscopy and colposcopy. The procedure is considered a screening test for cervical cancer and is complementary to Pap smear. The technique was initially developed by Adolf Stafl, MD, of Medical College of Wisconsin in 1981.

Unlike colposcopy, cervicography does not have a current CPT/HCPCS code and typically is not covered by most medical insurance companies. (Cervicography was given a Category III CPT code of 0003T, but this was discontinued in 2006.)

Cervicography is no more sensitive than Pap smear screening, and has a higher false positive rate (thus increasing the number of colposcopies needed).

Whether cervicography could have a role in countries where Pap smear screening programs are not in place depends on cost effectiveness and remained to be determined as of 1998. A 2005 study found the sensitivity and specificity of cervicography for cervical intraepithelial neoplasia to be 72.3% and 93.2% respectively; however, a 2007 study criticized the sensitivity figure as "likely... inflated" because the "gold standard" of colposcopy/biopsy may have missed cases of cervical intraepithelial neoplasia.
