= Chaperone (social) =

Person who accompanies an unmarried woman in public

A chaperone (also spelled chaperon) in its original social usage was a person who for propriety's sake accompanied an unmarried girl in public; usually she was an older married woman, and most commonly the girl's own mother.

In modern social usage, a chaperon (frequent in British spelling) or chaperone (usual in American spelling) is a responsible adult who accompanies and supervises young people. By extension, the word chaperone is used in clinical contexts.

== Origin ==
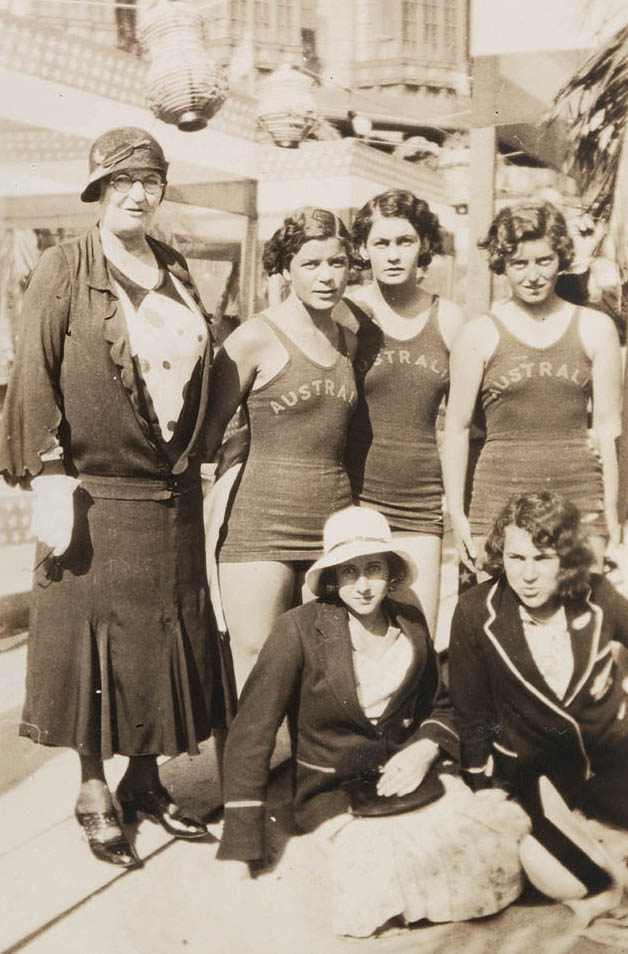
Mrs. Chambers (chaperone), Bonnie Mealing, Clare Dennis, Frances Bult, Eileen Wearne, Thelma Kench (N.Z. sprinter) at the 1932 Summer Olympics in Los Angeles, California, USA

The word derives figuratively from the French word chaperon (originally from the Late Latin cappa, meaning "cape"), which referred to a hood that was worn by individuals generally. A chaperone was part of the costume of the Knights of the Garter when they were in full dress and, probably, since the Knights were court attendants, the word chaperon changed to mean escort. An alternative explanation comes from the sport of falconry, where the word meant the hood placed over the head of a bird of prey to stop its desire to fly.

According to the Oxford English Dictionary the noun (in its figurative sense of escort of females) is attested from 1721, and the verb 'to chaperon' from 1811. A synonymic or related concept is third wheel, third party, fifth wheel or gooseberry.

== Traditional institution ==
Although the supervision of vulnerable women in public spaces may be common in many cultures, the specific word chaperon began to be used in the eighteenth century to denote a particular social institution, namely, a woman who would accompany a young unmarried woman in public, and especially where she might be expected to meet a man. In circumstances where, for whatever reason, the mother was unavailable to perform this function, another woman, usually well known to the family, was chosen. A chaperon was usually expected to be a married woman, although a respected, older unmarried or widowed woman (typically someone beyond child-bearing age) was often acceptable.

Chaperones were usually not required in situations where an unmarried woman's father was able to accompany his daughter(s). Chaperones for young men were not commonly employed in Western society until the latter half of the 20th century, although depending on the precise nature of the business he was on, a young male who temporarily left the company of his parents would usually find himself under the supervision of coaches, employers or other such individuals (such personnel were not typically seen to be chaperones in the traditional sense).

== Duenna ==
English-speaking cultures supposed, perhaps correctly, that the institution was particularly strict in southern Europe, especially in Spain, to which they attributed the word duenna, an Old Spanish spelling (ñ arose as a ligature of nn; the tilde was shorthand for the second n, written over the first) of the modern Spanish word dueña. By an extended usage the word duenna has come to mean a young woman's female companion from any culture, particularly one who is exceedingly strict. The Oxford English Dictionary instances "There is no duenna so rigidly prudent as ... a superannuated coquette", and even any disapproving person irrespective of gender (where it instances "He drew his lips together in that duenna-like way").

== Current usage ==
Chaperones were expected to exercise stern authority over their charges; this, combined with the fact that young people typically had little or no say in the choice of a chaperone, could lead to resistance and resentment on the part of the young people being supervised. One particular effect of the perceived need for the chaperoning of young women was that the early development of women's sport, already impaired by a reluctance on the part of society to accept the presence of females in organized sports, was further inhibited for several decades due to the extra costs involved in hiring chaperones.

The practice of one-on-one chaperones for social occasions has largely fallen out of use in Western society. Today, the term is most often applied to parents and teachers who supervise groups of young people (often of mixed genders) at school dances, sporting events, field trips and other such events. Often, for short trips where adults are required to perform other functions (such as coaching) these adults will be expected to perform chaperoning duties as well. This practice both saves money and has the potential to foster a better relationship between young people and the adults chaperoning them.

A major drawback of such an arrangement is that the adults involved are often hired for other reasons besides their qualifications to supervise children and adolescents. There is, therefore, the potential that such adults may be presented an opportunity to engage in physical, emotional and/or sexual abuse of their charges. Therefore, in present-day situations where young people plan to be away from their families for an extended period of time, such as modern-day cinema, theatre and television productions where the cast includes children as well as other areas such as high-level sport or modeling, there is often a legal obligation to have a staff role of a chaperone, responsible for their general safety and well-being while away from their parents. Chaperones must be qualified in specialist childcare areas such as pediatric first aid, child protection, and all required reporting and workforce requirements.

== See also ==
- Baedeker, a 19th-century German publisher which pioneered travel guides
- Bodyguard
- Chaperone (clinical), a person whose role is to witness and safeguard both a patient and a medical practitioner
- Cicisbeo
- Reproductive rights
- Women and Islam for a discussion of the requirement for an unmarriageable male relative (called a mahram) to accompany women
