= Ayre spatula =

Device for collecting a Pap smear

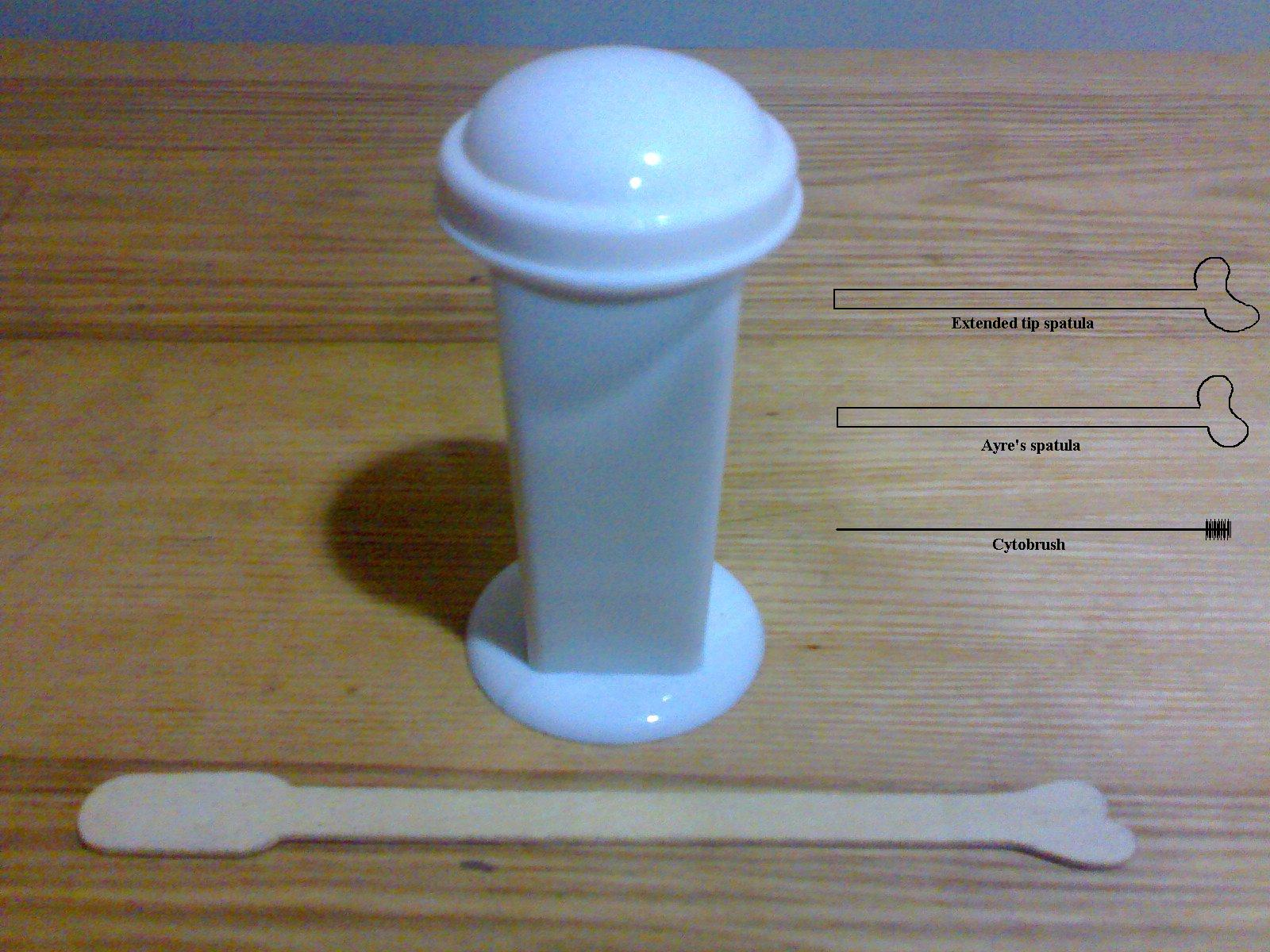
An Ayre spatula (bottom) with a slide holding bottle

The Ayre spatula is a device used to collect Pap smear. It is a wooden spatula with U-shaped openings on one side and a flat surface on another. The broad end is for vaginal sample collection and the narrow end is for cervical sample collection. It is rotated 360 degrees in the vagina to obtain the cells to be sent for Pap smear examination. Recent studies have shown that long-tipped spatulas (Aylesbury device) or a cytobrush along with an extended-tip spatula are better than an Ayre spatula in collecting endocervical cells. However, the Ayre spatula continues to be used for cervical sample collection in lower-income countries. The Ayre spatula is introduced into the cervix after exposing the external os using a speculum. The cytology specimens are obtained by rotating the spatula firmly over the ectocervix and quickly transferring the cells to a slide or jar.

The Ayre spatula was invented by James Ernest Ayre and Georgios Papanikolaou. Ayre was granted a patent for it in 1949 and donated the profits from sales of the spatula to the American Cancer Society.
