= National Cancer Center =

US nonprofit organization

- Formation: 1953
- Founder: James Ernest Ayre M.D.
- Type: not-for-profit organization
- Services: Programs include: Aggressive Cancer Research, The Breast Cancer Project, The Children's Cancer Project, Fighting Childhood Leukemia, NCC Special Programs, and the Prostate Cancer Project
- Website: nationalcancercenter.org

National Cancer Center ("NCC" or "Center"), founded in 1953, is a (501)(c)(3) not-for-profit organization in the United States that funds young cancer researchers who are working to discover how the body's immune system sees and responds to cancer when it initially develops and why certain cancer cells are resistant to different treatments. The organization also provides educational information to the public on the prevention, diagnosis and treatment of cancer.

Grants are awarded based on the recommendations of NCC's Scientific Advisory Board, which uses National Institutes of Health evaluation standards. Scientific Advisory Board members are cancer research professionals, headed by Dr. Darell Bigner, founder and director of Duke University’s Preston Robert Tisch Brain Tumor Center, the largest brain tumor research facility in the country. Other Grant Review Committee members represent such institutions as the Dana-Farber Cancer Institute, the University of Pittsburgh Cancer Institute, and the Duke University Medical Center.

The Center's funding of basic research epitomizes the high standards of founder Dr. James Ernest Ayre. Dr. James Ernest Ayre was a ground-breaking gynecologist dedicated to cancer research by ways of immunology and cytology detection. He was the co-inventor of the Ayre spatula, a wooden device used to collect cervical cells in women to detect cancer, and a strong advocate for early cancer screening.

The National Cancer Center funds these research programs: The Breast Cancer Project, The Children’s Cancer Project, Aggressive Cancer Research, Fighting Childhood Leukemia, and The Prostate Cancer Project.
