= Triple smear =

- Synonyms: Vaginal-cervical-endocervical smear
- Test of: Samples of the ectocervix, vagina, and endocervix

Triple smear, also known as vaginal-cervical-endocervical (VCE) smear is a cytopathology technique for identifying lesions of the female genital tract. The smear is prepared on separate areas of a single slide with three distinct samples, each from ectocervix, vagina and endocervix. Each sample occupies one-third of the glass slide. This method requires expertise as three samples need to be collected rapidly to avoid drying up of the smear. Triple smear is recommended in patients who had a previous abnormal smear (or endometrial debris in previous smear in a climacteric woman), in postmenopausal women, women with perimenopausal bleeding and those with high risk for endometrial carcinoma.
