= Pap test =

Papanicolaou test
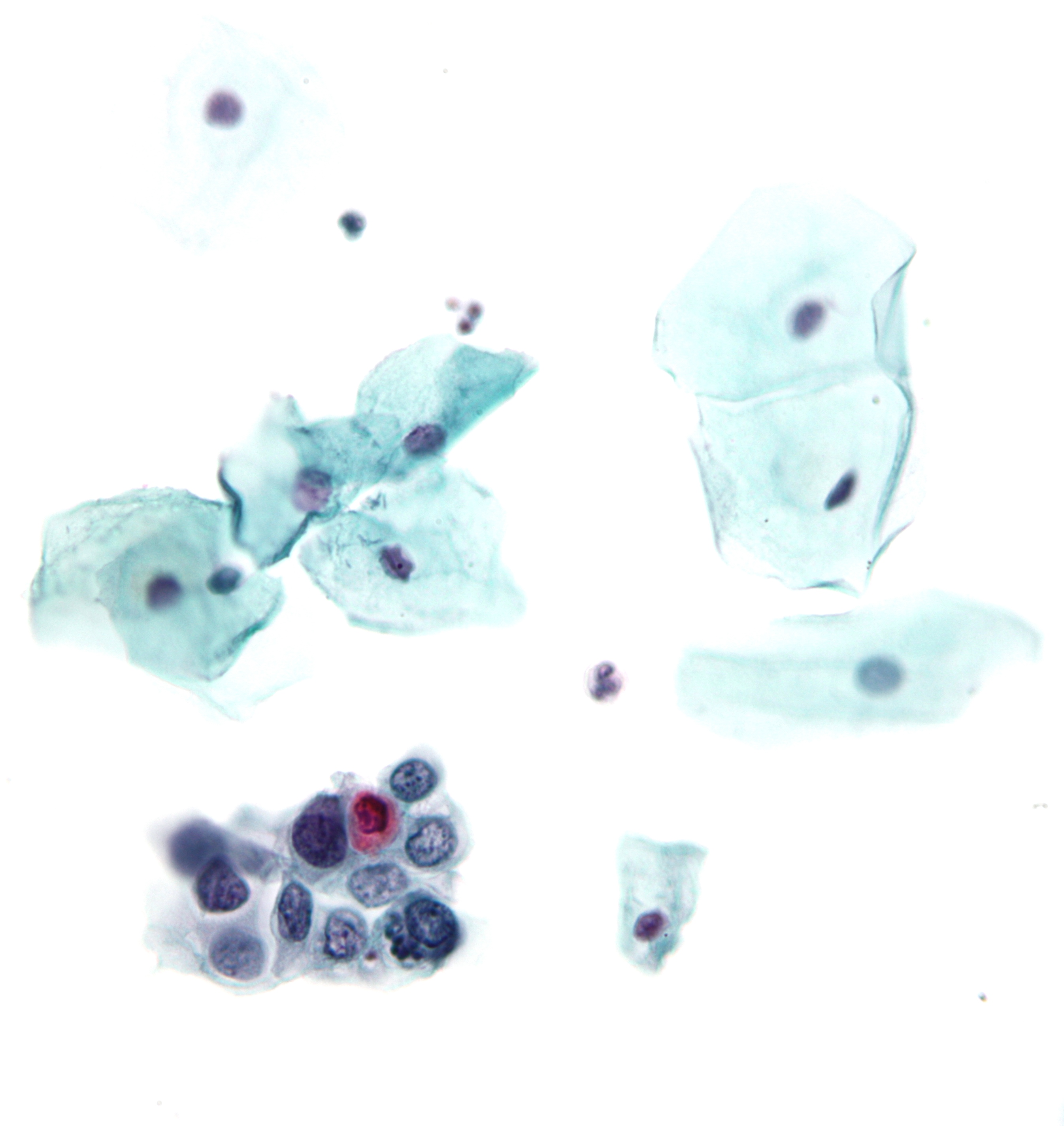
- High-grade squamous intraepithelial lesion
- Specialty: Gynaecology, cytopathology
- ICD-9-CM: 795.00
- MeSH: D014626
- MedlinePlus: 003911

The Papanicolaou test (abbreviated as Pap test, also known as Pap smear (AE), cervical smear (BE), or smear test (BE)) is a method of cervical screening used to detect potentially precancerous and cancerous processes in the cervix (opening of the uterus or womb) or, more rarely, anus (in both men and women) or the vaginal vault. In patients who have had a hysterectomy, the cervix is normally removed and Pap smears are not indicated (unless the uterus was removed on suspicion of neoplasia). Abnormal findings are often followed up by more sensitive diagnostic procedures and, if warranted, interventions that aim to prevent progression to cervical cancer. The test was independently invented in the 1920s by the Greek physician Georgios Papanikolaou and named after him. A simplified version of the test was introduced by the Canadian obstetrician Anna Marion Hilliard in 1957.

A Pap smear is performed by opening the vagina with a speculum and collecting cells at the outer opening of the cervix at the transformation zone (where the outer squamous cervical cells meet the inner glandular endocervical cells), using an Ayre spatula or a cytobrush. The collected cells are examined under a microscope to look for abnormalities. The test aims to detect potentially precancerous changes (called cervical intraepithelial neoplasia (CIN) or cervical dysplasia; the squamous intraepithelial lesion system (SIL) is also used to describe abnormalities) caused by human papillomavirus, a sexually transmitted DNA virus. The test remains an effective, widely used method for early detection of precancer and cervical cancer. While the test may also detect infections and abnormalities in the endocervix and endometrium, it is not designed to do so.

Guidelines on when to begin Pap smear screening are varied, but usually begin in adulthood. Guidelines on frequency vary from every three to five years. If results are abnormal, and depending on the nature of the abnormality, the test may need to be repeated in six to twelve months. If the abnormality requires closer scrutiny, the patient may be referred for detailed inspection of the cervix by colposcopy, which magnifies the view of the cervix, vagina and vulva surfaces. The person may also be referred for HPV DNA testing, which can serve as an adjunct to Pap testing. In some countries, viral DNA is checked for first, before checking for abnormal cells. Additional biomarkers that may be applied as ancillary tests with the Pap test are evolving.

== Medical uses ==
Summary of reasons for testing
patient's characteristic	indication	rationale
under age 21, regardless of sexual history	no test	more harms than benefits
age 20–25 until age 50–60	test every 3–5 years if results normal	broad recommendation
over age 65; history of normal tests	no further testing	recommendation of USPSTF, ACOG, ACS and ASCP;
had total hysterectomy for non-cancer disease – cervix removed	no further testing	harms of screening after hysterectomy outweigh the benefits
had partial hysterectomy – cervix remains	continue testing as normal	
has received HPV vaccine	continue testing as normal	vaccine does not cover all cancer-causing types of HPV
history of endometrial cancer, with history of hysterectomy	discontinue routine testing	test no longer effective and likely to give false positive

Screening guidelines vary from country to country. In general, screening starts about the age of 20 or 25 and continues until about the age of 50 or 60. Screening is typically recommended every three to five years, as long as results are normal.

American Congress of Obstetricians and Gynecologists (ACOG) and others recommend starting screening at age 21. Many other countries wait until age 25 or later to start screening. For instance, some parts of Great Britain start screening at age 25. ACOG's general recommendation is that people with female reproductive organs age 30–65 have an annual well-woman examination, that they not get annual Pap tests, and that they do get Pap tests at three to five year intervals.

HPV is passed through skin to skin contact; sex does not have to occur, although it is a common way for it to spread. It takes an average of a year, but can take up to four years, for a person's immune system to clear the initial infection. Screening during this period may show this immune reaction and repair as mild abnormalities, which are usually not associated with cervical cancer, but could cause the patient stress and result in further tests and possible treatment. Cervical cancer usually takes time to develop, so delaying the start of screening a few years poses little risk of missing a potentially precancerous lesion. For instance, screening people under age 25 does not decrease cancer rates under age 30.

HPV can be transmitted in sex between females, so those who have only had sex with other females should be screened, although they are at somewhat lower risk for cervical cancer.

Guidelines on frequency of screening vary—typically every three to five years for those who have not had previous abnormal smears. Some older recommendations suggested screening as frequently as every one to two years, however there is little evidence to support such frequent screening; annual screening has little benefit but leads to greatly increased cost and many unnecessary procedures and treatments. It has been acknowledged since before 1980 that most people can be screened less often. In some guidelines, frequency depends on age; for instance in Great Britain, screening is recommended every three years for women under 50, and every five years for those over.

Screening should stop at about age 65 unless there is a history of abnormal test result or disease. There is probably no benefit in screening people aged 60 or over whose previous tests have been negative. If a woman's last three Pap results were normal, she can discontinue testing at age 65, according to the USPSTF, ACOG, ACS, and ASCP; England's NHS says 64. There is no need to continue screening after a complete hysterectomy for benign disease.

Pap smear screening is still recommended for those who have been vaccinated against HPV since the vaccines do not cover all HPV types that can cause cervical cancer. Also, the vaccine does not protect against HPV exposure before vaccination.

Those with a history of endometrial cancer should discontinue routine Pap tests after hysterectomy. Further tests are unlikely to detect recurrence of cancer but do bring the risk of giving false positive results, which would lead to unnecessary further testing.

More frequent Pap smears may be needed to follow up after an abnormal Pap smear, after treatment for abnormal Pap or biopsy results, or after treatment of cancer (cervical, anal, etc.).

=== Effectiveness ===
The Pap test, when combined with a regular program of screening and appropriate follow-up, can reduce cervical cancer deaths by up to 80%.

Failure of prevention of cancer by the Pap test can occur for many reasons, including not getting regular screening, lack of appropriate follow-up of abnormal results, and sampling and interpretation errors. In the US, over half of all invasive cancers occur in females who have never had a Pap smear; an additional 10–20% of cancers occur in those who have not had a Pap smear in the preceding five years. About one-quarter of US cervical cancers were in people who had an abnormal Pap smear but did not get appropriate follow-up (patient did not return for care, or clinician did not perform recommended tests or treatment).

Adenocarcinoma of the cervix has not been shown to be prevented by Pap smears. In the UK, which has a Pap smear screening program, adenocarcinoma accounts for about 15% of all cervical cancers.

Estimates of the effectiveness of the United Kingdom's call and recall system vary widely, but it may prevent about 700 deaths per year in the UK.

Multiple studies have performed sensitivity and specificity analyses on Pap smears. Sensitivity analysis captures the ability of Pap smears to correctly identify women with cervical cancer. Various studies have revealed the sensitivity of Pap smears to be 47.19–55.5%. Specificity analysis captures the ability of Pap smears to correctly identify women without cervical cancer. Various studies have revealed the specificity of Pap smears to be 64.79–96.8%. While Pap smears may not be entirely accurate, they remain one of the most effective cervical cancer prevention tools. Pap smears may be supplemented with HPV DNA testing.

=== Results ===
In screening a general or low-risk population, most Pap results are normal. The main target is cellular atypia, which may be transient, but may also potentially progress to cancer, or even indicate existing cancer.

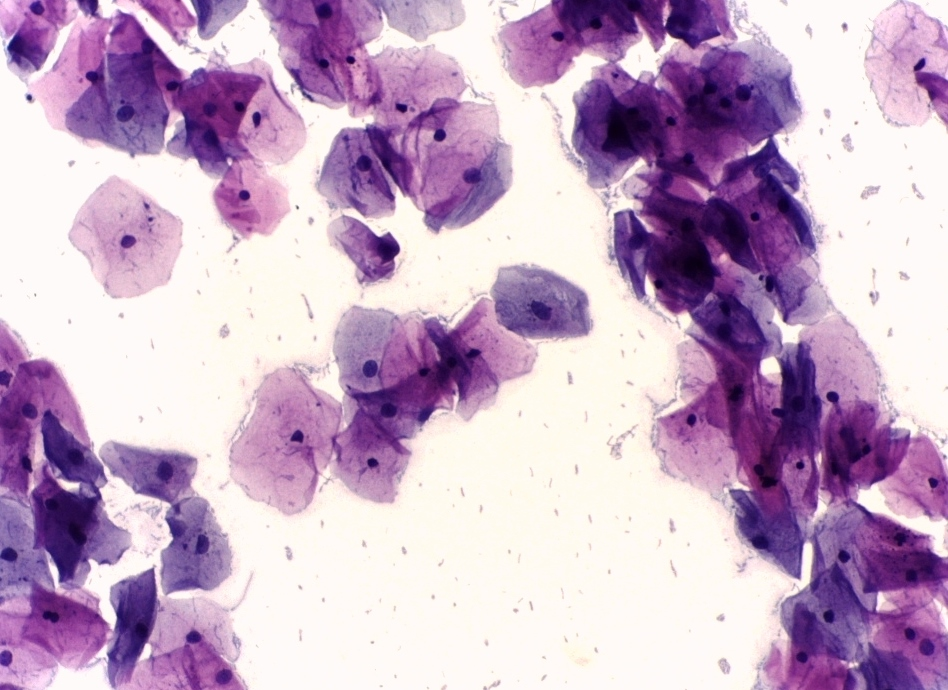
Micrograph of a normal Pap smear

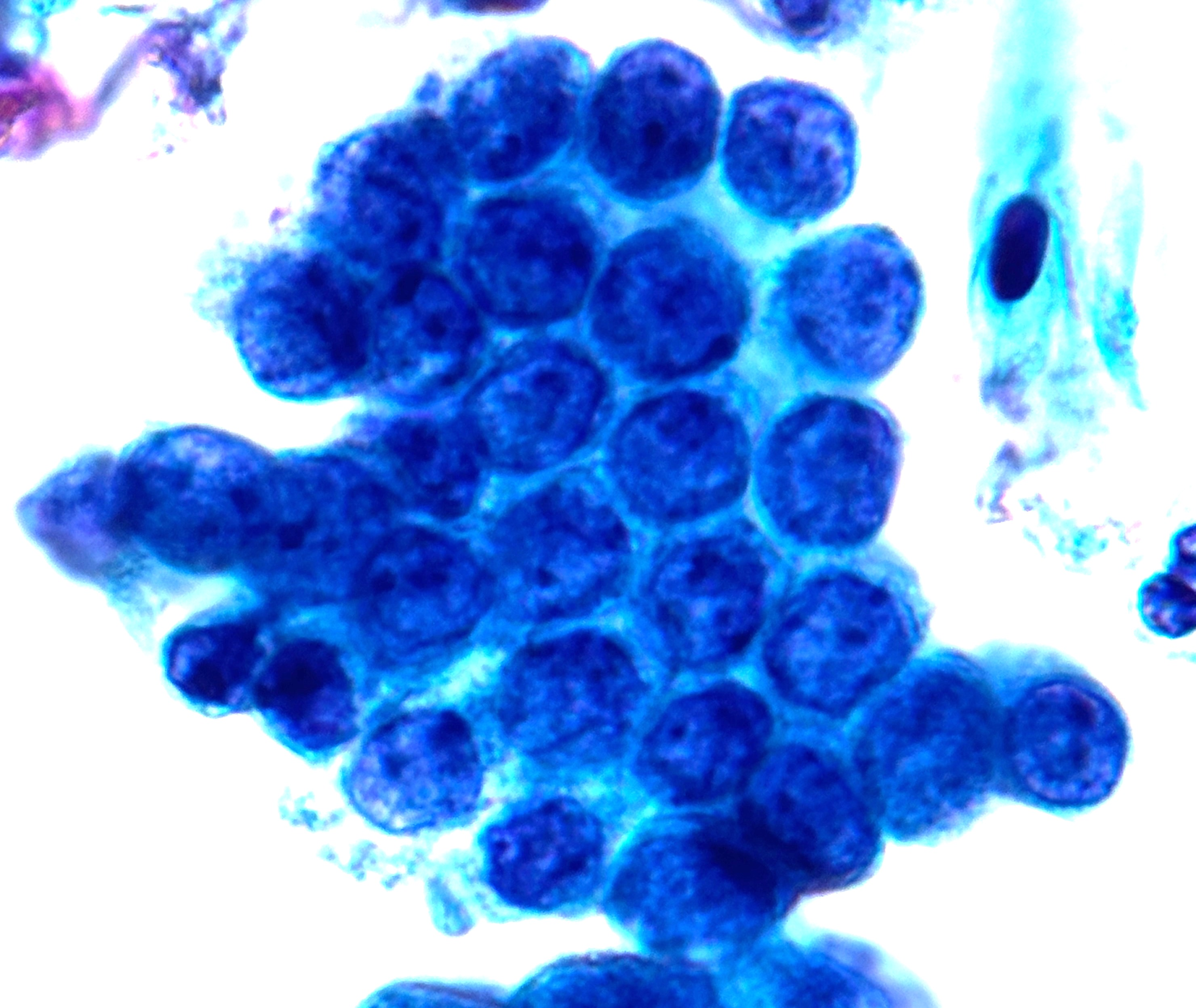
Endocervical cells on a Pap test, appearing as sheets with a honeycomb pattern. Such cells should be present on the slide as evidence of adequate sampling.

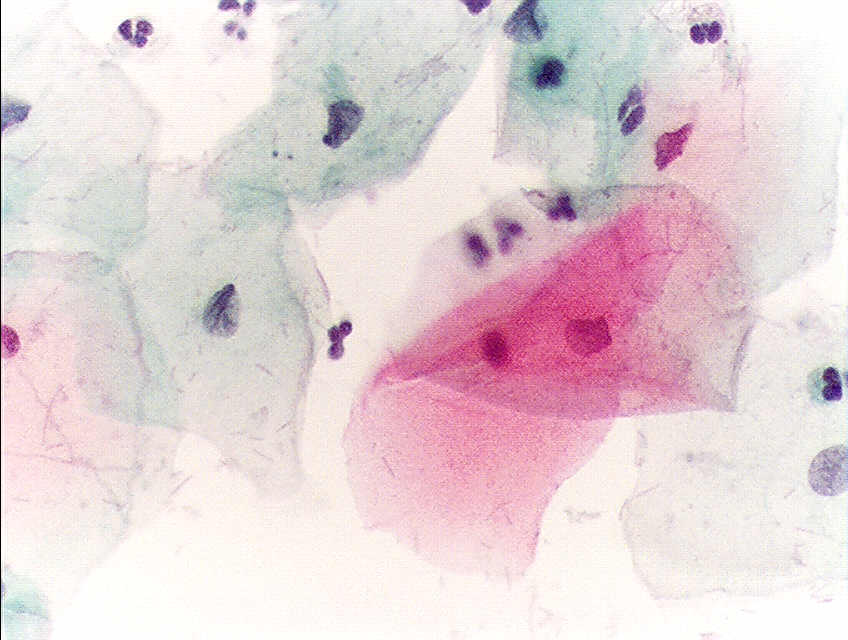
Normal squamous epithelial cells in premenopausal women

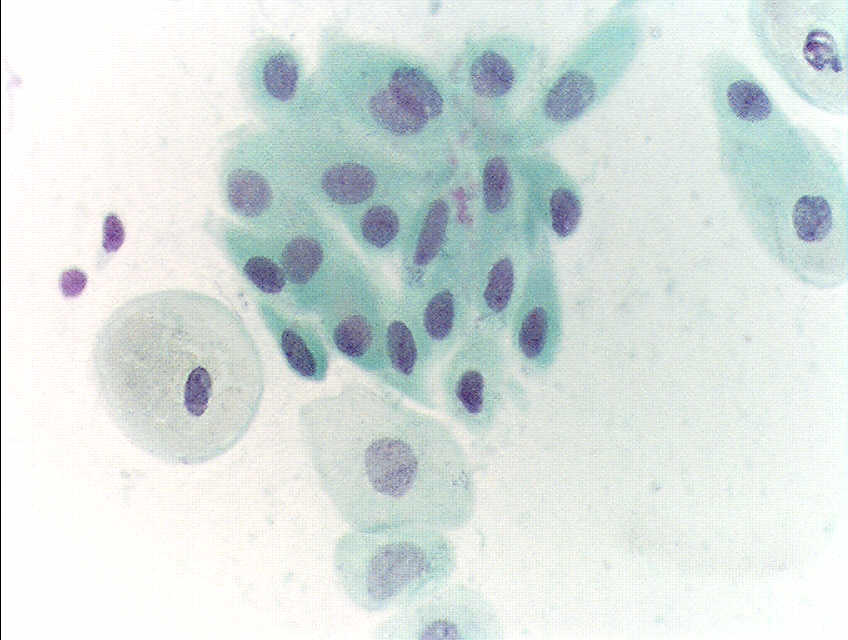
Atrophic squamous cells in postmenopausal women

Cellular atypia

In the United States, about 2–3 million abnormal Pap smear results are found each year. Most abnormal results are mildly abnormal (ASC-US (typically 2–5% of Pap results) or low-grade squamous intraepithelial lesion (LSIL) (about 2% of results)), indicating HPV infection. Although most low-grade cervical dysplasias spontaneously regress without ever leading to cervical cancer, dysplasia can serve as an indication that increased vigilance is needed.

In a typical scenario, about 0.5% of Pap results are high-grade SIL (HSIL), and less than 0.5% of results indicate cancer; 0.2 to 0.8% of results indicate Atypical Glandular Cells of Undetermined Significance (AGC-NOS).

As liquid-based preparations (LBPs) become a common medium for testing, atypical result rates have increased. The median rate for all preparations with low-grade squamous intraepithelial lesions using LBPs was 2.9% in 2006, compared with a 2003 median rate of 2.1%. Rates for high-grade squamous intraepithelial lesions (median, 0.5%) and atypical squamous cells have changed little.

Abnormal results are reported according to the Bethesda system. They include:

- Atypical squamous cells (ASC)
  - Atypical squamous cells of undetermined significance (ASC-US)
  - Atypical squamous cells – cannot exclude HSIL (ASC-H)
- Squamous intraepithelial lesion (SIL)
  - Low-grade squamous intraepithelial lesion (LGSIL or LSIL)
  - High-grade squamous intraepithelial lesion (HGSIL or HSIL)
- Squamous cell carcinoma
- Glandular epithelial cell abnormalities
  - Atypical glandular cells not otherwise specified (AGC or AGC-NOS)
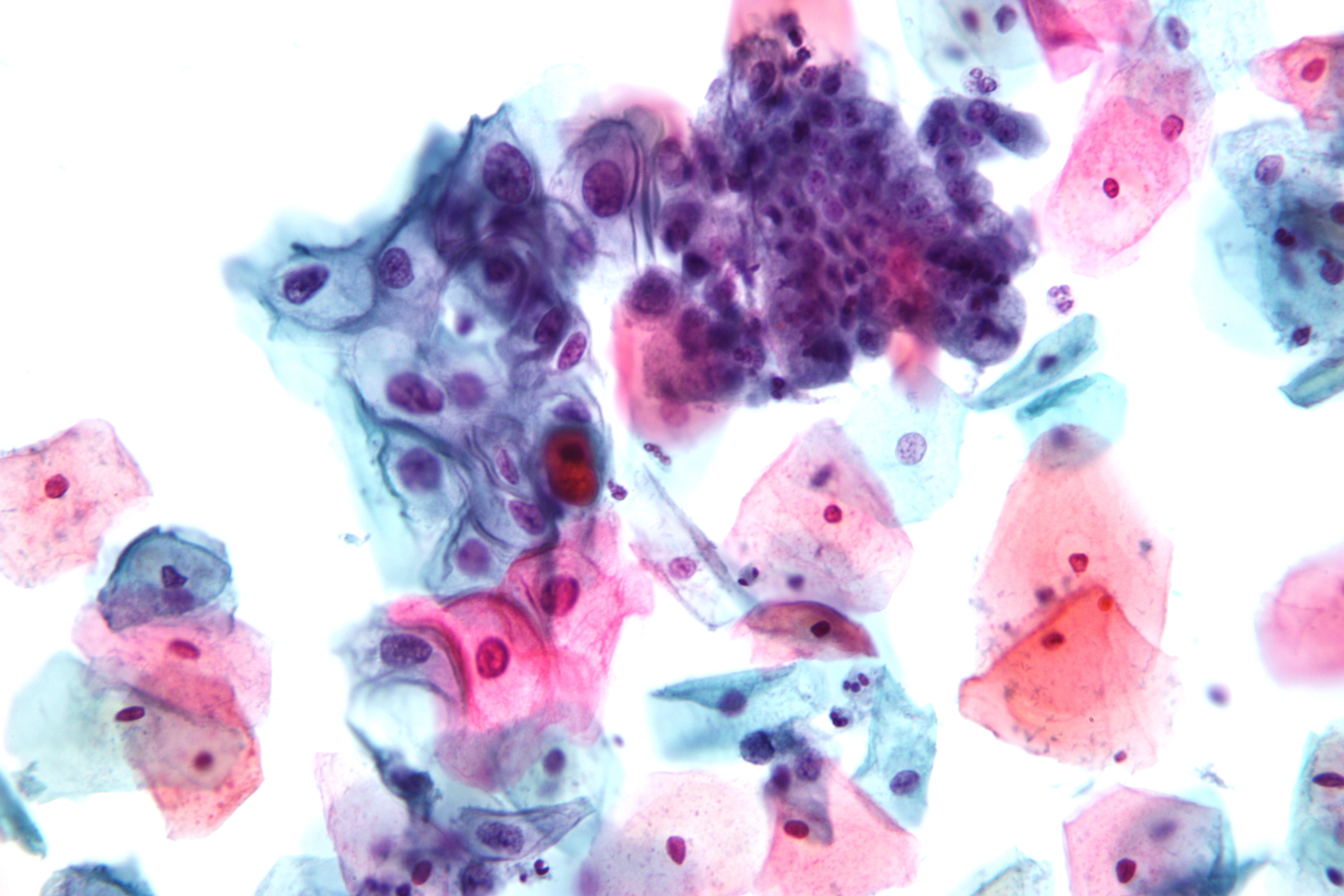
Micrograph of a Pap test showing a low-grade squamous intraepithelial lesion (LSIL) and benign endocervical mucosa. Pap stain.

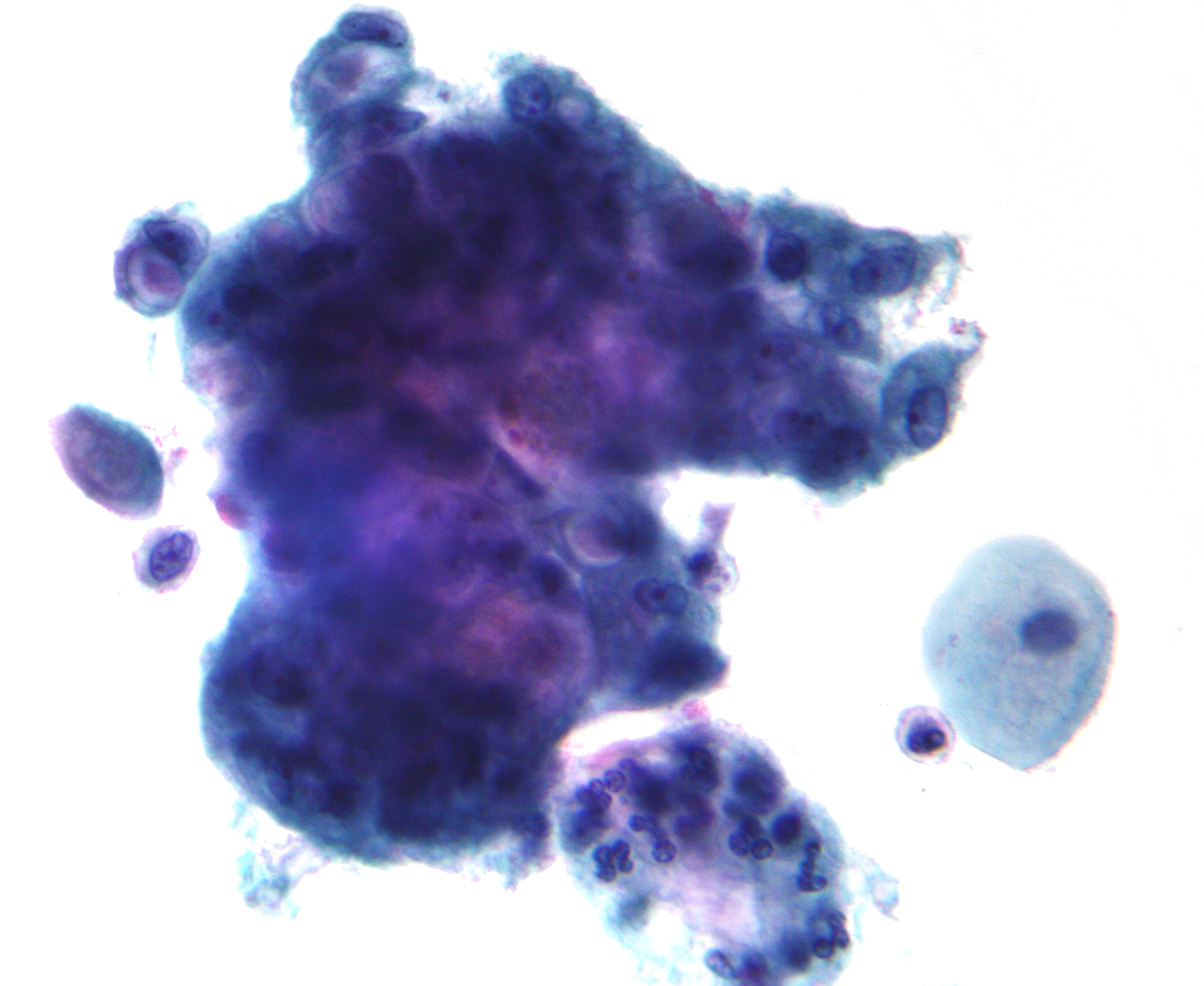
Endocervical adenocarcinoma on a Pap test

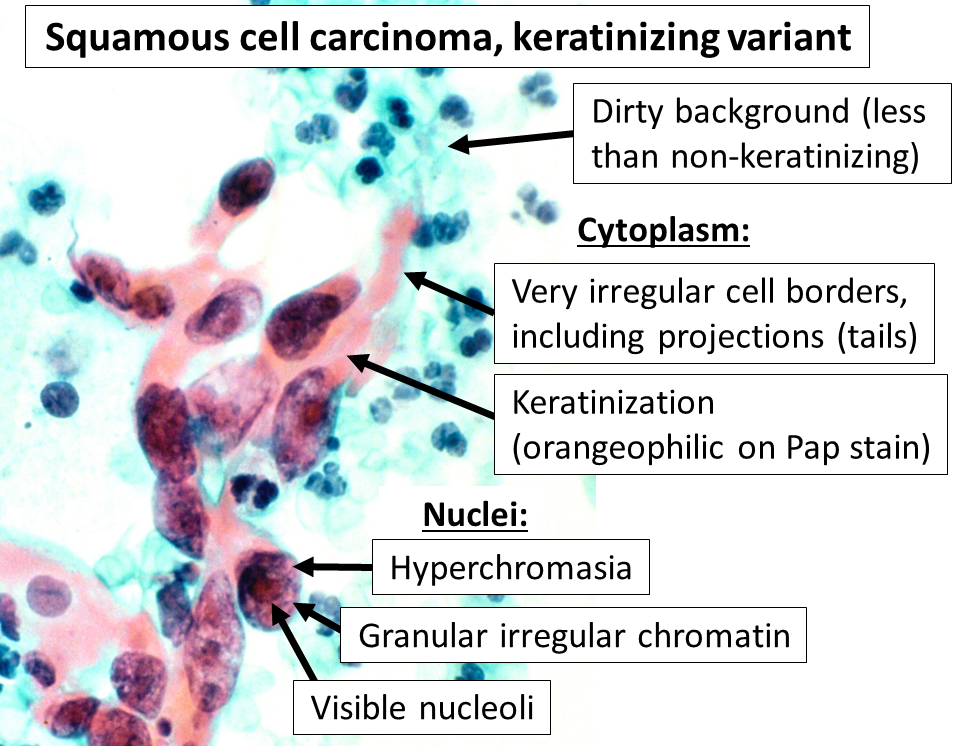
Keratinizing squamous cell carcinoma

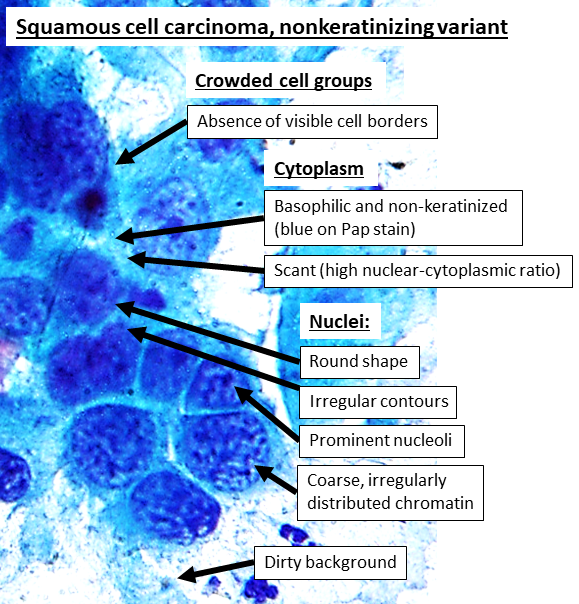
Nonkeratinizing squamous cell carcinoma

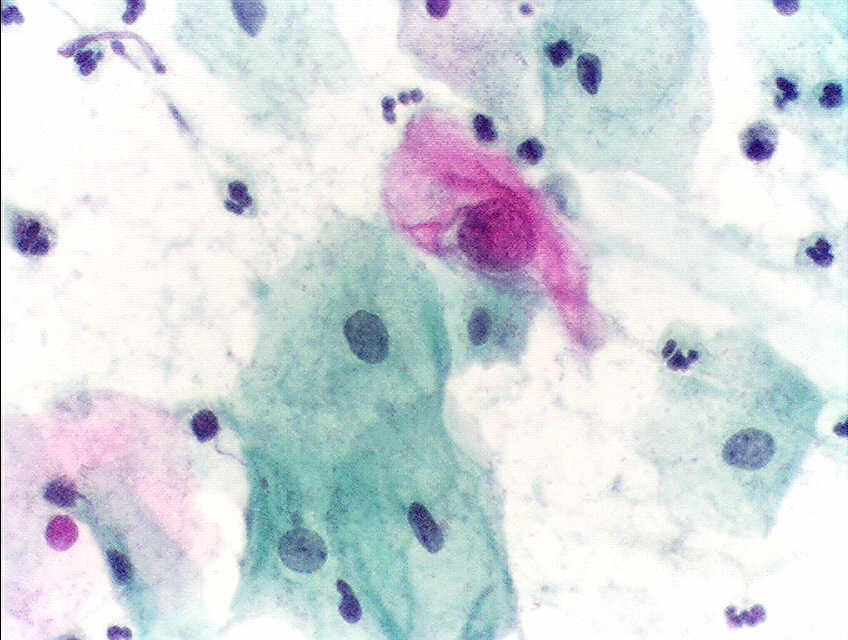
An obviously atypical cell

Other abnormal findings

Endocervical and endometrial abnormalities can also be detected, as can a number of infectious processes, including yeast, herpes simplex virus and trichomoniasis. However it is not very sensitive at detecting these infections, so absence of detection on a Pap does not mean absence of the infection.

Micrograph of a Pap test showing trichomoniasis as oval-to-pear-shaped Trichomonas vaginalis organisms with cyanophilic, granular cytoplasm and faint eccentric nuclei.

Herpes simplex: multinucleation, nuclear molding, chromatin margination, and a Cowdry type A inclusion.

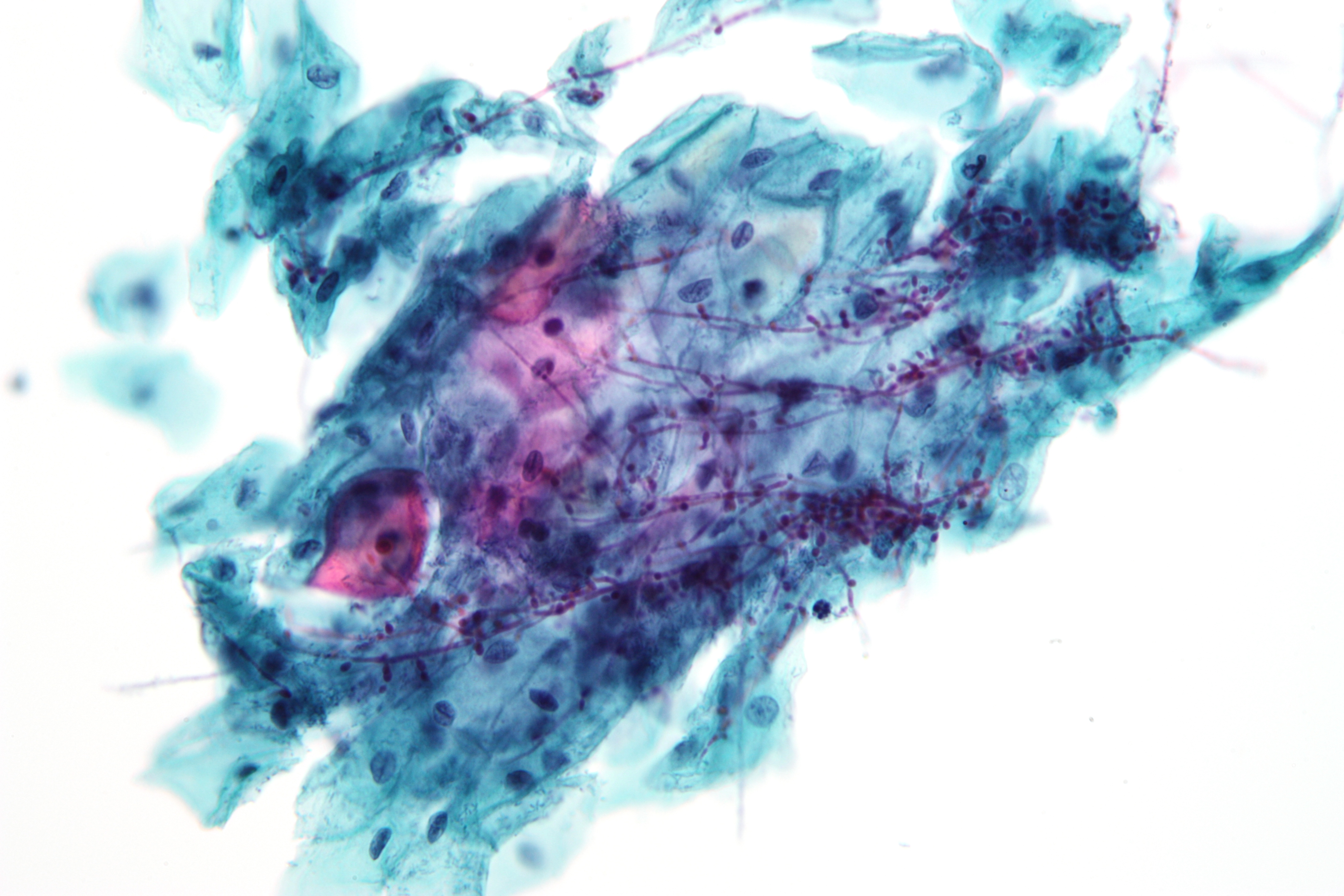
Candida organisms on a Pap test

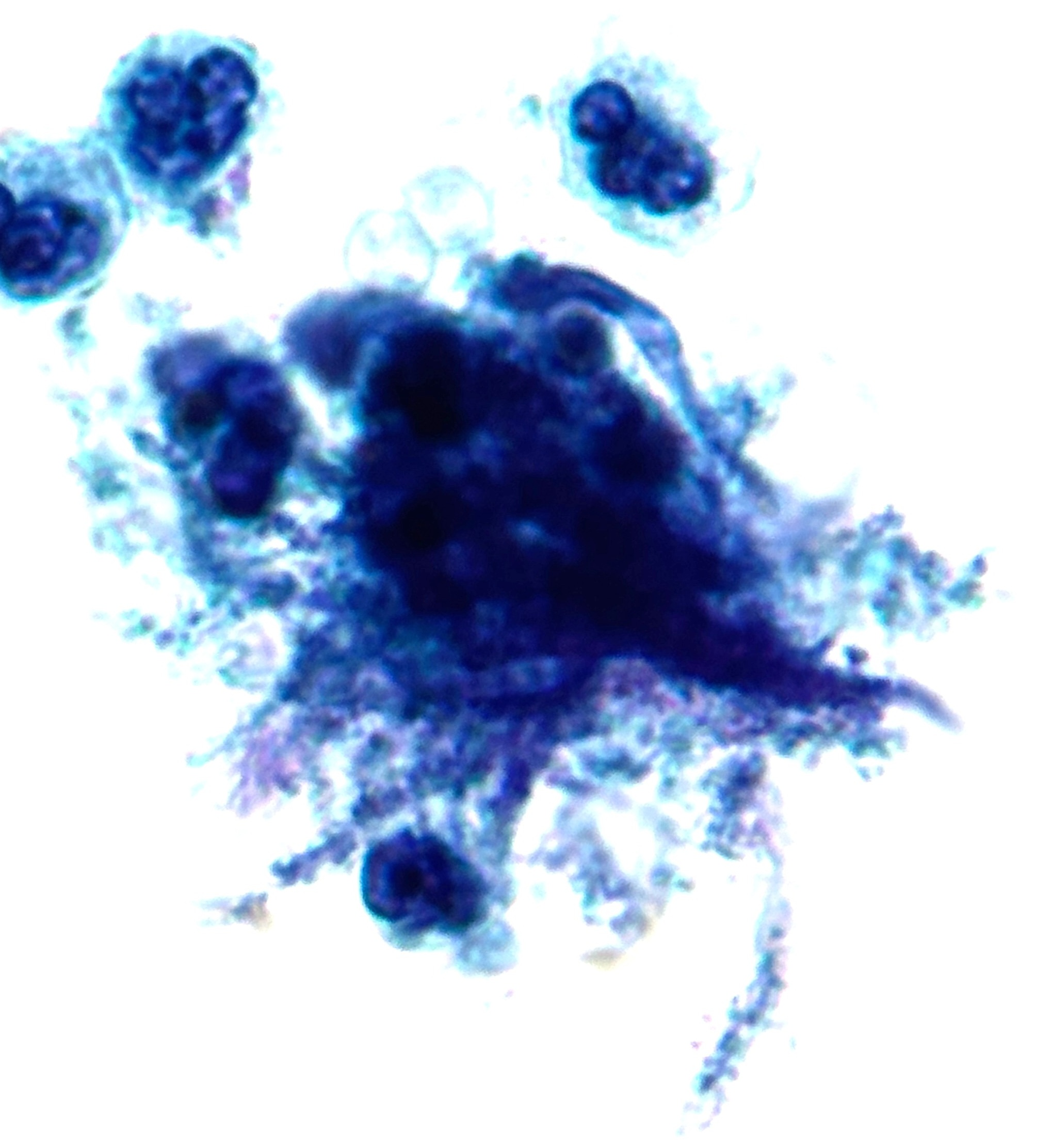
Actinomyces: dense basophilic “cotton-ball” colonies with radiating, tangled filamentous organisms, surrounded by neutrophil granulocytes

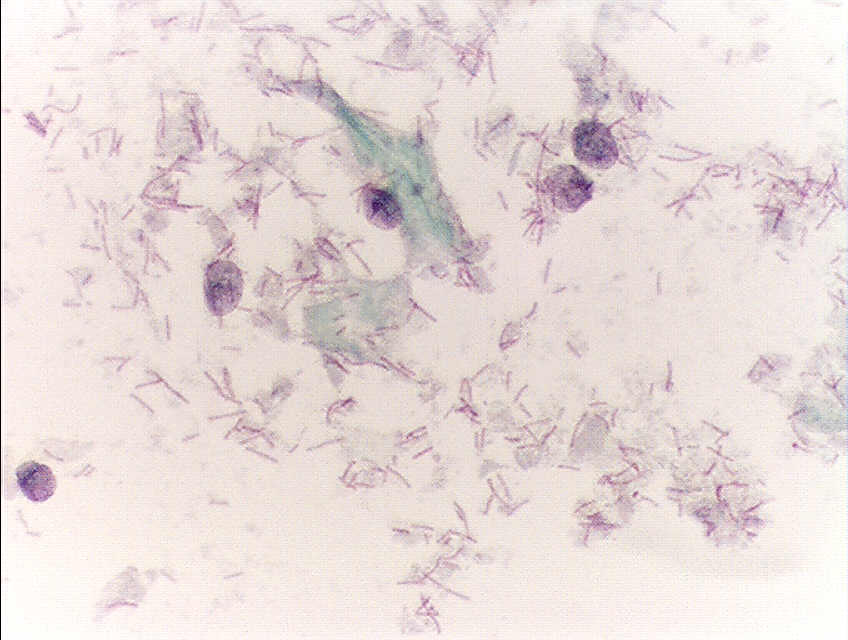
The cytoplasm of squamous epithelial cells is lysed; numerous Döderlein bacilli are present

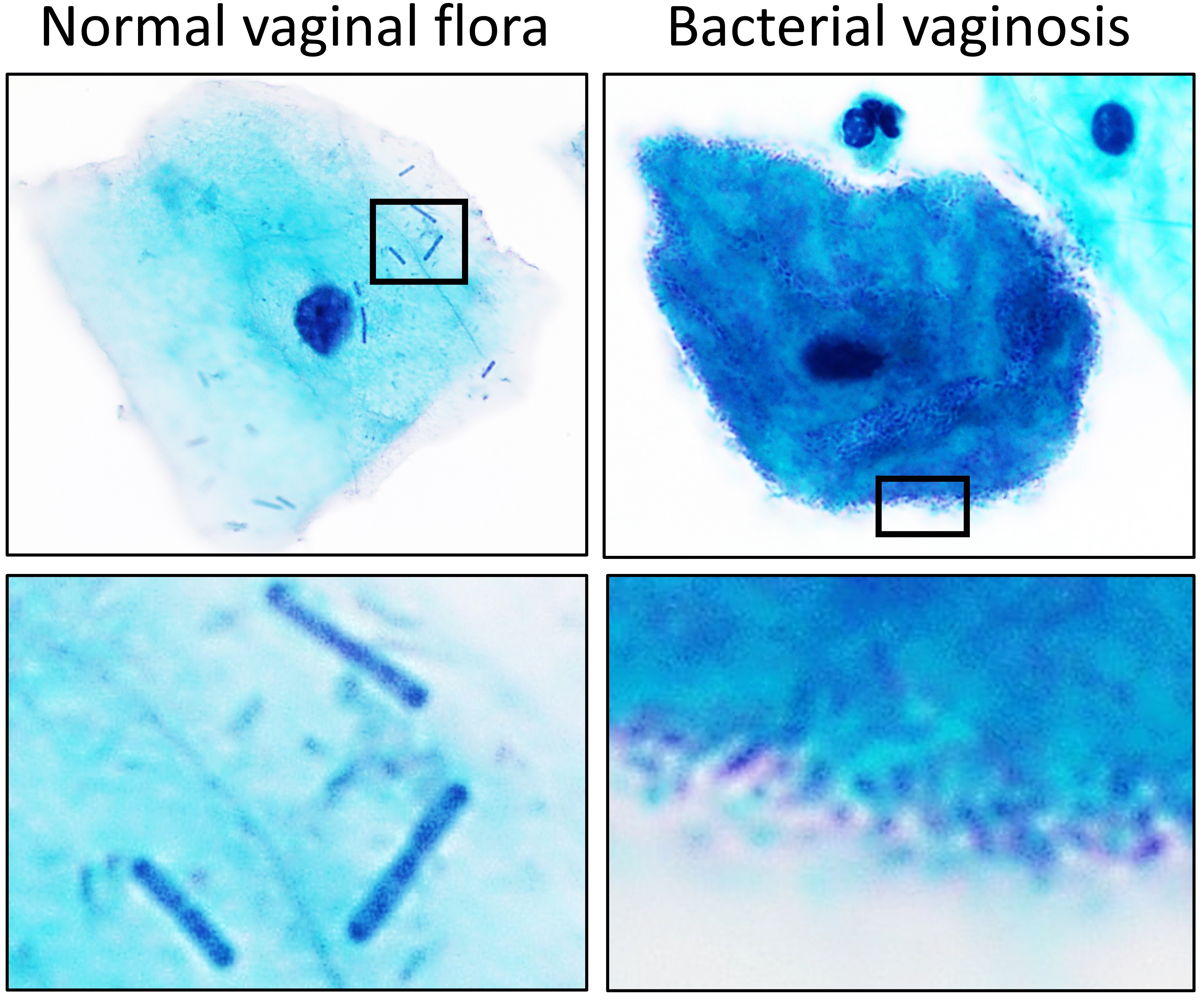
Normal vaginal flora versus bacterial vaginosis

=== Pregnancy ===
Pap tests can usually be performed during pregnancy up to at least 24 weeks of gestational age. Pap tests during pregnancy have not been associated with increased risk of miscarriage. An inflammatory component is commonly seen on Pap smears from pregnant women and does not appear to be a risk for subsequent preterm birth.

After childbirth, it is recommended to wait 12 weeks before taking a Pap test because inflammation of the cervix caused by the birth interferes with test interpretation.

=== In transgender individuals ===
Transgender men are also typically at risk for HPV due to retention of the uterine cervix in the majority of individuals in this subgroup. As such, professional guidelines recommend that transgender men be screened routinely for cervical cancer using methods such as Pap smear, identical to the recommendations for cisgender women.

However, transgender men have lower rates of cervical cancer screening than cisgender women. Many transgender men report barriers to receiving gender-affirming healthcare, including lack of insurance coverage and stigma/discrimination during clinical encounters, and may encounter provider misconceptions regarding risk in this population for cervical cancer. Pap smears may be presented to patients as non-gendered screening procedures for cancer rather than one specific for examination of the female reproductive organs. Pap smears may trigger gender dysphoria in patients and gender-neutral language can be used when explaining the pathogenesis of cancer due to infection, emphasizing the pervasiveness of HPV infection regardless of gender.

Transgender women who have not had vaginoplasties are not at risk of developing cervical cancer because they do not have cervices. Transgender women who have had vaginoplasties and have a neo-cervix or neo-vagina have a small chance of developing cancer, according to the Canadian Cancer Society. Surgeons typically use penile skin to create the new vagina and cervix, which can contract HPV and lead to penile cancer, although it is considerably rarer than cervical cancer. Because the risk of this kind of cancer is so low, cervical cancer screening is not routinely offered for those with a neo-cervix.

== Procedure ==
According to the CDC, intercourse, douching, and the use of vaginal medicines or spermicidal foam should be avoided for 2 days before the test. A number of studies have shown that using a small amount of water-based gel lubricant does not interfere with, obscure, or distort the Pap smear. Further, cytology is not affected, nor are some STD testing. The CDC states that Pap smears can be performed during menstruation. However, the NHS recommends against cervical screening during, or in the 2 days before and after, menstruation. Pap smears can be performed during menstruation, especially if the physician is using a liquid-based test; however if bleeding is extremely heavy, endometrial cells can obscure cervical cells, and if this occurs the test may need to be repeated in 6 months.

Pap smears begin with the insertion of a speculum into the vagina, which spreads the vagina open and allows access to the cervix. The health care provider then collects a sample of cells from the outer opening or external os of the cervix by scraping it with either a spatula or brush.

Obtaining a Pap smear should not cause much pain, but may be uncomfortable. Conditions such as vaginismus, vulvodynia, or cervical stenosis can cause insertion of the speculum to be painful.

In a conventional Pap smear, the cells are placed on a glass slide and taken to the laboratory to be checked for abnormalities.

A plastic-fronded broom is sometimes used in place of the spatula or brush. The broom is not as good a collection device, since it is much less effective at collecting endocervical material than the spatula and brush. The broom is used more frequently with the advent of liquid-based cytology, although either type of collection device may be used with either type of cytology.

The sample is stained using the Papanicolaou technique, in which tinctorial dyes and acids are selectively retained by cells. Unstained cells cannot be seen adequately with a light microscope. Papanicolaou chose stains that highlighted cytoplasmic keratinization, which actually has almost nothing to do with the nuclear features used to make diagnoses now.

A single smear has an area of 25 x 50 mm and contains a few hundred thousand cells on average. Screening with light microscopy is first done on low (10x) power and then switched to higher (40x) power upon viewing suspicious findings. Cells are analyzed under high power for morphologic changes indicative of malignancy (including enlarged and irregularly shaped nucleus, an increase in nucleus to cytoplasm ratio, and more coarse and irregular chromatin). Approximately 1,000 fields of view are required on 10x power for screening of a single sample, which takes on average 5 to 10 minutes.

In some cases, a computer system may prescreen the slides, indicating those that do not need examination by a person or highlighting areas for special attention. The sample is then usually screened by a specially trained and qualified cytotechnologist using a light microscope. The terminology for who screens the sample varies according to the country; in the UK, the personnel are known as cytoscreeners, biomedical scientists (BMS), advanced practitioners and pathologists. The latter two take responsibility for reporting the abnormal sample, which may require further investigation.

=== Automated analysis ===
Since the early 2000s, there have been successful attempts to develop automated, computer image analysis systems for screening. Although, on the available evidence, automated cervical screening could not be recommended for implementation into a national screening program, an NHS Health technology appraisal in 2005 concluded that the "general case for automated image analysis ha(d) probably been made". Automation may improve sensitivity and reduce unsatisfactory specimens. Two systems have been approved by the FDA and function in high-volume reference laboratories, with human oversight.

=== Types of screening ===
- Conventional Pap – In a conventional Pap smear, samples are smeared directly onto a microscope slide after collection.
- Liquid-based cytology – The sample of (epithelial) cells is taken from the transitional zone, the squamocolumnar junction of the cervix, between the ectocervix and the endocervix. The cells taken are suspended in a bottle of preservative for transport to the laboratory, where they are analyzed using Pap stains.

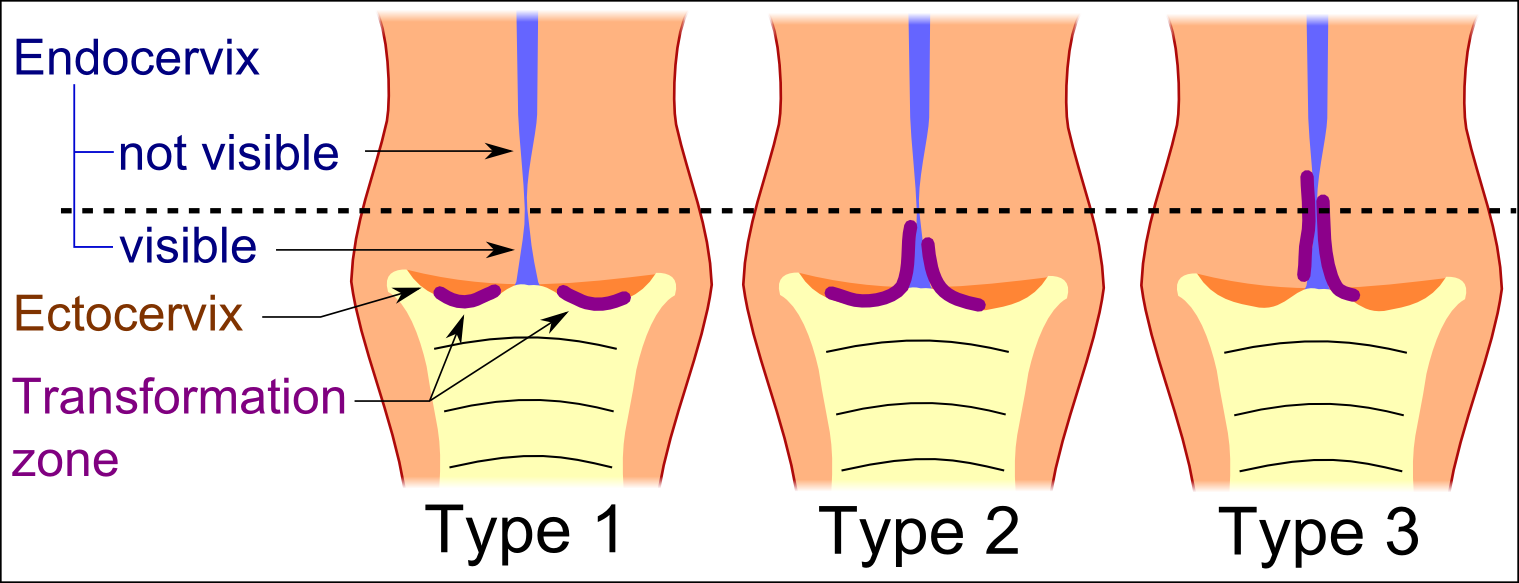
Transformation zone types, determining the Pap test location: Type 1: Completely ectocervical. Type 2: Endocervical component but fully visible. Type 3: Endocervical component, not fully visible.

Cervix in relation to upper part of vagina and posterior portion of uterus

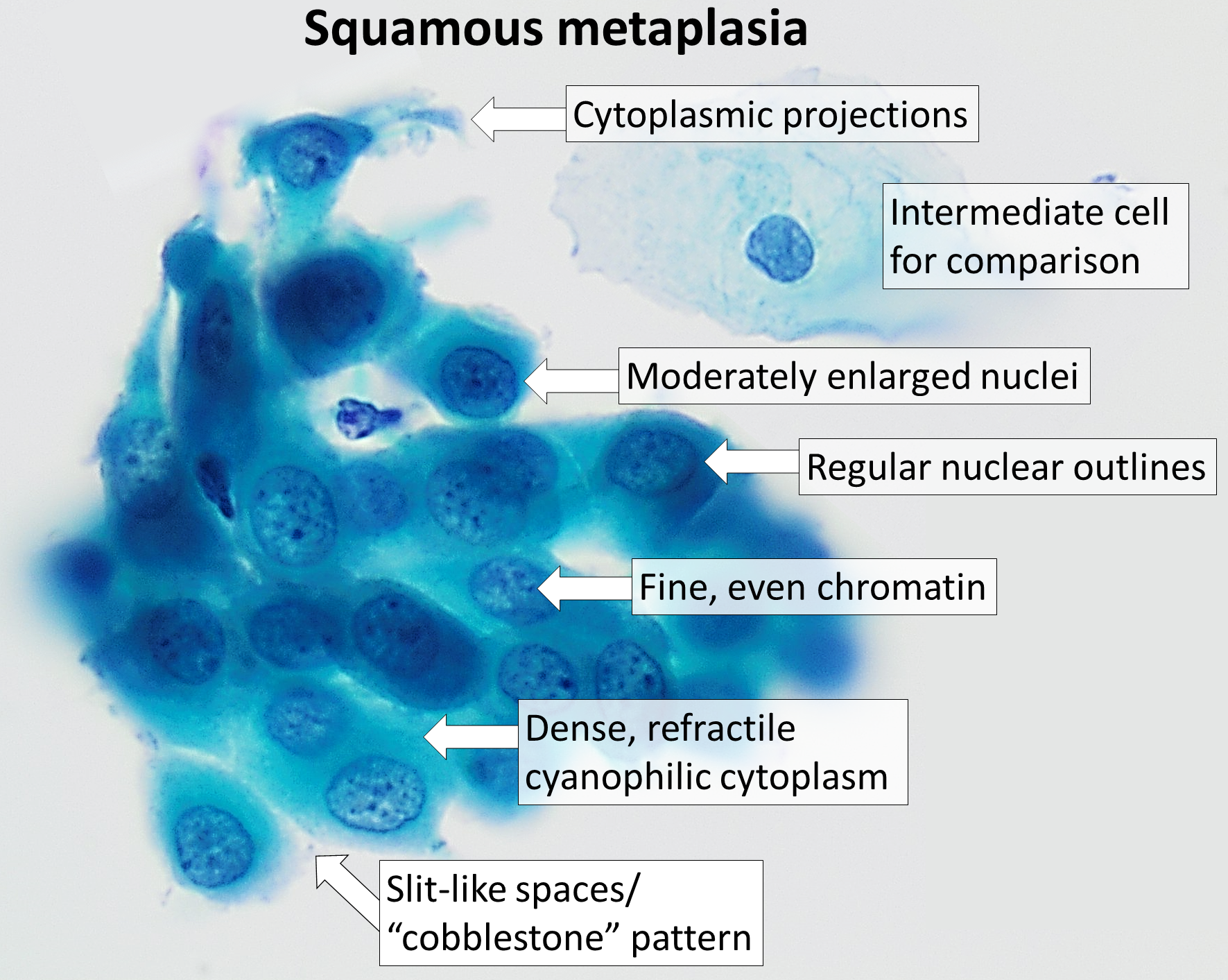
Squamous metaplasia of the cervix, with typical features. Pap stain.

Pap tests commonly examine epithelial abnormalities, such as metaplasia, dysplasia, or borderline changes, all of which may be indicative of CIN. Nuclei will stain dark blue, squamous cells will stain green and keratinised cells will stain pink/ orange. Koilocytes may be observed where there is some dyskaryosis (of epithelium). The nucleus in koilocytes is typically irregular, indicating possible cause for concern; requiring further confirmatory screens and tests.

In addition, human papillomavirus (HPV) test may be performed either as indicated for abnormal Pap results, or in some cases, dual testing is done, where both a Pap smear and an HPV test are done at the same time (also called Pap co-testing).

=== Practical aspects ===
The endocervix may be partially sampled with the device used to obtain the ectocervical sample, but due to the anatomy of this area, consistent and reliable sampling cannot be guaranteed. Since abnormal endocervical cells may be sampled, those examining them are taught to recognize them.

The endometrium is not directly sampled with the device used to sample the ectocervix. Cells may exfoliate onto the cervix and be collected from there, so as with endocervical cells, abnormal cells can be recognised if present but the Pap test should not be used as a screening tool for endometrial malignancy.

In the United States, a Pap test itself costs $20 to $30, but the costs for Pap test visits can cost over $1,000, largely because additional tests are added that may or may not be necessary.

== History ==
The test was invented by and named after the Greek doctor Georgios Papanikolaou, who started his research in 1923. Aurel Babeș independently made similar discoveries in 1927. However, Babeș' method was radically different from Papanikolaou's.

The Pap test was finally recognized only after a leading article in the American Journal of Obstetrics and Gynecology in 1941 by Papanikolaou and Herbert F. Traut, an American gynecologist. A monograph titled Diagnosis of Uterine Cancer by the Vaginal Smear that they published contained drawings of the various cells seen in patients with no disease, inflammatory conditions, and preclinical and clinical carcinoma. The monograph was illustrated by Hashime Murayama, who later became a staff illustrator with the National Geographic Society. Both Papanikolaou and his wife, Andromachi Papanikolaou, dedicated the rest of their lives to teaching the technique to other physicians and laboratory personnel.

== Experimental techniques ==
In the developed world, cervical biopsy guided by colposcopy is considered the "gold standard" for diagnosing cervical abnormalities after an abnormal Pap smear. Other techniques such as triple smear are also done after an abnormal Pap smear. The procedure requires a trained colposcopist and can be expensive to perform. However, Pap smears are very sensitive and some negative biopsy results may represent undersampling of the lesion in the biopsy, so negative biopsy with positive cytology requires careful follow-up.

Experimental visualization techniques use broad-band light (e.g., direct visualization, speculoscopy, cervicography, visual inspection with the application of acetic acid or with Lugol's Iodine, and colposcopy) and electronic detection methods (e.g., Polarprobe and in vivo spectroscopy). These techniques are less expensive and can be performed with significantly less training. They do not perform as well as Pap smear screening and colposcopy. At this point, these techniques have not been validated by large-scale trials and are not in general use.

== Implementation by country ==
=== Australia ===
Australia has used the Pap test as part of its cervical screening program since its implementation in 1991 which required women past the age of 18 be tested every two years. In December 2017 Australia discontinued its use of the Pap test and replaced it with a new HPV test that is only required to be conducted once every five years from the age of 25. Medicare covers the costs of testing; however, if a patient's doctor does not allow bulk billing, they may have to pay for the appointment and then claim the Medicare rebate.

=== Taiwan ===
Free Pap tests were offered from 1974 to 1984 before being replaced by a system in which all women over the age of 30 could have the cost of their Pap test reimbursed by the National Health Insurance in 1995. This policy was still ongoing in 2018 and encouraged women to screen at least every three years.

Despite this, the number of people receiving Pap tests remain lower than countries like Australia. Some believe this is due to a lack of awareness regarding the test and its availability. It has also been found that women who have chronic diseases or other reproductive diseases are less likely to receive the test.

=== England ===
As of 2020 the NHS maintains a cervical screening program in which women between the age of 25–49 are routinely invited for a smear test every three years, and women past 50 every five years. Much like Australia, England uses a HPV test before examining cells that test positive using the Pap test. The test is free as part of the national cervical screening program. Patients between 25-49 testing HPV negative after the 1st of July 2025 will now be invited after 5 years from the date that their test has been taken.

== Coccoid bacteria ==
The finding of coccoid bacteria on a Pap test is of no consequence with otherwise normal test findings and no infectious symptoms. However, if there is enough inflammation to obscure the detection of precancerous and cancerous processes, it may indicate treatment with a broad-spectrum antibiotic for streptococci and anaerobic bacteria (such as metronidazole and amoxicillin) before repeating the smear. Alternatively, the test will be repeated at an earlier time than it would otherwise. If there are symptoms of vaginal discharge, bad odor or irritation, the presence of coccoid bacteria also may indicate treatment with antibiotics as per above.

== Other Papanicolaou Stained Specimens ==
Papanicolaou staining is also performed on other cytology samples in diagnostic (AKA non-gynaecological) cytology, often in conjunction with other forms of staining such as the May-Grunwald Giemsa technique of Romanowsky staining. This may include fine needle aspirations (FNAs), Ascitic fluid, Urine, Seminal fluid, Cerebrospinal fluid,Peritoneal fluid, Bile duct brushings or sputum

For the further information on Papanicolaou staining, please see Papanicolaou stain
