= Well-woman examination =

Reproductive health examination for women

A well-woman examination is an exam offered to women to review elements of their reproductive health. The exam includes a breast examination, a pelvic examination and a Pap smear but may include other procedures. Hospitals employ strict policies relating to the provision of consent by the patient, the availability of chaperones at the examination, and the absence of other parties.

== Importance ==
Although women often undergo well-woman examinations on an annual basis, the interval for this visit and exam will vary depending on the needs of the patient. The purpose of this exam in asymptomatic women is to screen for potential abnormalities, such as sexually transmitted infections, and malignancy.

== Breast examination ==
=== Visual inspection ===
The breast examination begins with a visual inspection. With the patient in a supine or seated position, the medical professional will look at both breasts to check the color, symmetry, dimensions according to age, lean body mass, the physiological (pregnancy and lactation) and race, looking for abnormalities, such as bulges and shrinkage. One of these abnormalities is changed in the areola or nipple. If it is flattened or retracted (umbilicated), it is necessary to consider the possibility of a cancerous lesion which has caused the malformation.

=== Palpation ===
Next, the breasts are palpated, again with the patient lying or sitting. The patient has to lift the arm and put one hand behind her head. With this position, the entire gland is palpated. It is also important to examine the armpits, because of masses that may be found there. The test is executed pressing the gland with two or three fingers against the chest wall, making a radial route or by quadrants. The nipples are also squeezed to check for secretions, such as secretion of milk (galactorrhea), serous, blood or purulent secretions. If a node is detected, it is necessary to determine its place, size, shape, edges, consistency and sensitivity.

=== Self-examination ===
Breast self-examination is not recommended as this practice is associated with increased false positive findings and no evidence of benefit. Instead breast self-awareness is encouraged. Breast self-awareness includes being familiar with the normal contour of one's breast but does not involve monthly self-examinations.

=== Further examination of the breasts ===
A mammogram is a special X-ray of the breasts. They are the procedure most likely to detect early breast cancer in asymptomatic women. Mammograms can show tumors long before they are large enough to palpate. They are recommended for women who have symptoms of breast cancer or who are at increased risk of developing the disease. They are performed with the patient standing, the breast pressed between two plastic plates, as the image is taken. The interpretation has to be performed by a specialist.

Breast ultrasound is a complementary study of mammography. In many women the tissue that makes up the breast is very dense, representing fibrous tissue and glandular tissue, which produces milk during lactation. This limits the radiologist interpreting the study, so, in these cases, the ultrasound is helpful, since this is capable of distinguishing tumors in women with dense breast tissue, where identification is otherwise difficult. Additionally, it is advisable to follow up a mammogram that shows indications of tumors with an ultrasound, to confirm, before more invasive procedures are undertaken.

== Pelvic exam ==
The pelvic exam is part of the physical examination of the internal pelvic organs (uterus, cervix, ovaries), vagina, and vulva. This exam often includes three parts:

1. Inspection of the vulva
2. Bimanual examination
3. Inspection of the cervix and vagina using a speculum.

=== Inspection of vulva ===
The patient is placed in a supine position on a special examination table, which has two protrusions called "stirrups". With the feet in these stirrups, the legs are placed in a position such that the medical professional can access the pelvic area. The external genitalia is examined first, looking for abnormalities like lesions, ulcers, warts and color changes. The elements of this exam include the vulva, which contains the mons pubis, of which there are two longitudinal folds of skin forming the labia majora; then the labia minora and hair follicles. The clitoral hood is also checked.

=== Bimanual exam ===
The purpose of this exam is to palpate or feel the pelvic organs. The index and middle finger are inserted into the vagina. This maneuver allows the doctor to palpate the vagina for any deep lacerations, masses, or nodularity. Next, the cervix is palpated to check position, size, consistency, and mobility. The other hand is placed on the abdomen, compressing the uterus between both hands. This maneuver allows the clinician to assess the size, shape, consistency, tilt, and mobility of the uterus. With this technique, the ovaries may also be palpable. This examination is useful for identifying clinical signs of medical conditions, such as infection, presence of a mass, or structural abnormality. "Regular performance of this examination is crucial in early detection and management of gynecological conditions, which can significantly enhance treatment outcomes."

=== Speculum examination ===
The speculum is an instrument made of metal or plastic and is constructed with two flaps. Its purpose is to separate and widen the vaginal opening and keep it open. This allows direct observation by the physician into the vaginal canal with the help of a lamp or a mirror. There are different types of speculums used within the different characteristics of each patient such as age, sex life, and other factors. The first step is to open the vaginal opening with two fingers at the vulvo-perineal angle, then separate the fingers slightly and press down, then insert the speculum arranging the width of the tip of the flaps in anteroposterior. Then the speculum is moved into the vagina at an angle of 45°, following the natural contour of the posterior vaginal wall. When the speculum is in place, the fingers are removed and the device is rotated so that the flaps are horizontal. The flaps are then separated and locked into place when the cervical neck is completely visible. The speculum examination is not necessary for adolescents who are asymptomatic.

== Screening tests ==
Samples for screening tests may be collected during the pelvic exam. These screening tests include:

1. Cervical cancer screening – A Pap smear and/or HPV testing may be performed as a screening test for cervical cancer. The procedure begins by gently scraping or sampling the cells of the cervix using a special spatula, brush or swab. Some women experience temporary bleeding from this procedure. The scrapings are placed on a slide, covered with a fixative for later examination under a microscope to determine if they are normal or abnormal. Depending on patient's age or Pap smear result, HPV testing may also be performed.
2. Sexually transmitted infection screening – Depending on age and risk factors, clinicians may recommend gonorrhea or chlamydia testing at the time of the well-woman exam. This sample can be collected via a swab of the cervix or vagina. This swab can be collected by the clinician or the patient. Urine samples can also be used for this test. Additional screening tests include blood tests for hepatitis C, HIV, and syphilis.
