= Speculoscopy =

Speculoscopy is a procedure in which a special blue-white light (Speculite) is used to examine the cervix for cancerous or pre-cancerous lesions.

Acetic acid is applied to the cervix, it is let sit for 60 seconds, then the cervix is examined with 4-6x magnification. The light is generated by a chemiluminescent light stick, which is attached to the inner side of the upper blade of the vaginal speculum by an adhesive strip. The test can be used to complement a pap smear in screening of cervical cancer. A negative speculoscopy, along with a negative pap smear provides greater assurance of absence of disease.

It was developed in 1988. It was FDA approved as an add-on to Pap smear screening in 1995.

At this time there is no CPT/HCPCS code for this and most medical insurance companies do not cover this procedure.

Light strip provides light for 15–20 minutes.
