= Chaperone (clinical) =

Trained witness of sensitive medical examinations

In clinical medicine, a chaperone is a person who serves as a witness for both a patient and a medical practitioner as a safeguard for both parties during a medical examination or procedure. The exact responsibilities vary according to the clinical situation.

Chaperones are widely used for gynecological and other intimate examinations. A chaperone may support the patient with reassurance and emotional support during a procedure or examination that the patient may find embarrassing or uncomfortable. The chaperone may also provide practical help to the doctor during an examination or procedure. In other clinical settings the chaperone could protect the doctor from physical attack.

As a witness, the chaperone can help the doctor disprove unfounded allegations having been present during a procedure and witnessed continuing consent. A chaperone should not be someone with a close connection to either the doctor or the patient, such as a family member.
