= Cytobrush =

Medical tool

A cytobrush is a plastic tool used to obtain cells from the cervix during the procedure of a Pap smear.

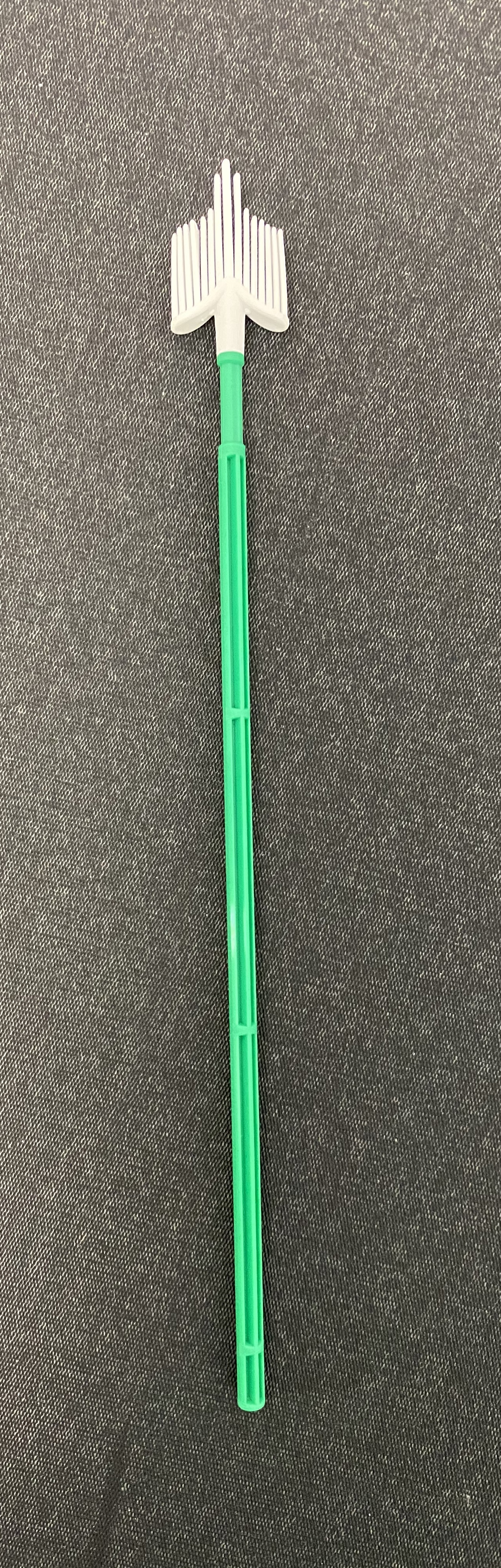
Cytobrush

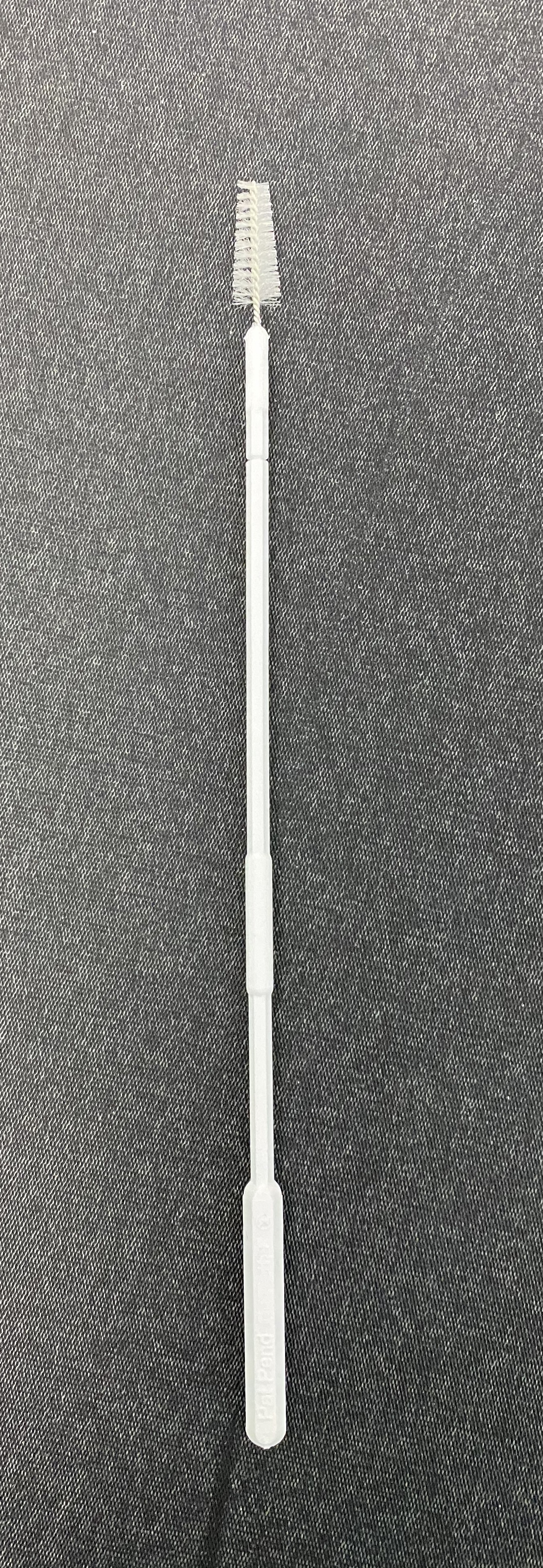
Cytobrush for sampling endocervical cells

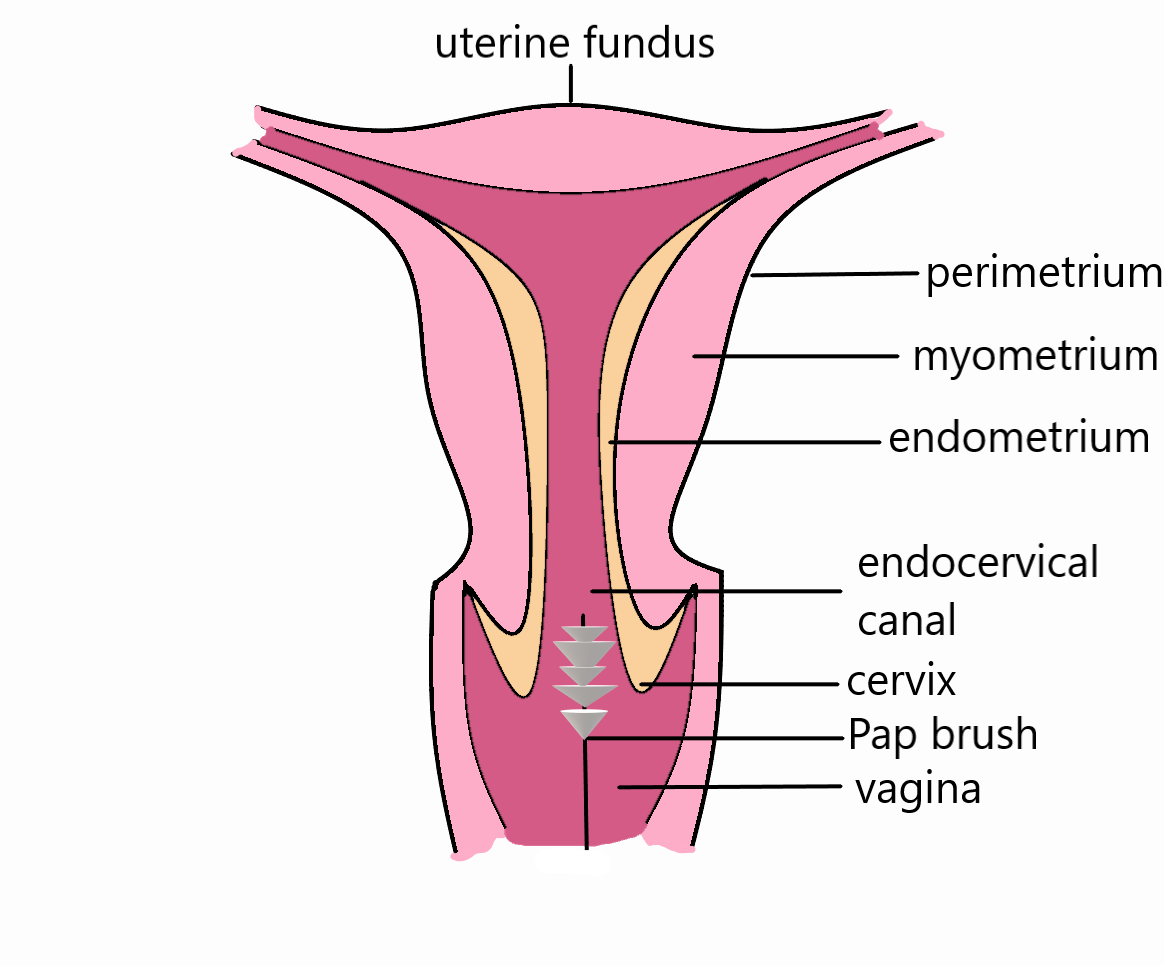
Diagram of cytobrush in vagina/cervix
