= Gynaecologic cytology =

Field of pathology

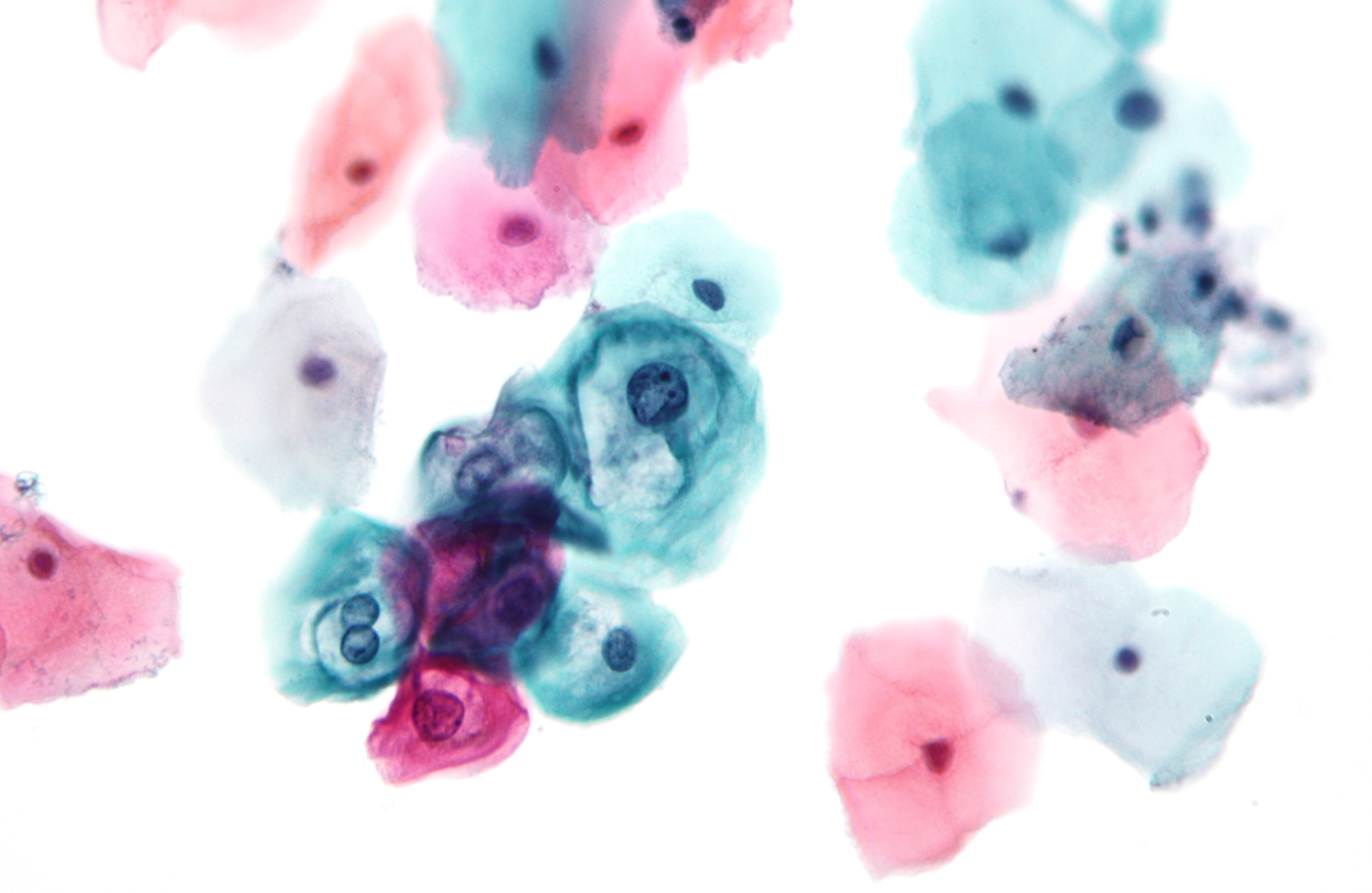
A Pap test showing a low-grade squamous intraepithelial lesion (LSIL). Pap stain.

Gynaecologic cytology, also gynecologic cytology, is a field of pathology concerned with the investigation of disorders of the female genital tract through the microscopic examination of cells. The most common investigation in this field is the Pap test, which is used to screen for precancerous and neoplastic changes of cervical cells. Cytological analysis of fine-needle aspirations (FNAs) and Pap tests (also known as Pap smears) can also be used to investigate malignancies of the ovaries, uterus, vagina and vulva.

== Cervical Cytologic Screening ==
=== Pap test ===
Dr. George Papanicolou devised the use of the Pap test as a cytology screening tool for cervical cancer nearly a century ago. This procedure involves collecting cells from the cervical transformation zone and immediate fixation and visualization on a glass slide. As a result of this screening tool, cervical cancer rates fell significantly by the early 20th century. The Bethesda System remains the standard in classifying Pap results. The Pap test has led to enormous and widespread success in reducing incidence, prevalence and mortality from cervical cancer, but limitations include both false positive and false negative screening results from inadequate samples (wrong sample site or inadequate sample) preparation or clerical errors.

=== Liquid-based cytology (LBC) ===
A newer cytological preparation for cervical cancer screening is liquid-based cytology (LBC). Instead of smearing collected cells on a slide, this method suspends cells in liquid preservative collection medium, such as ThinPrep or SurePrep. LBC provides significant advantages for testing, such as improving sample quality from removing potential contaminants and allowing flexibility for additional testing and follow up smears. However, LBC is more expensive than traditional Paps, and studies appear to show conflicting results regarding differences in sensitivity, specificity, positive predictive values, and negative predictive values compared to Pap tests.

=== Cytologic Screening as an Adjunct to HPV Testing ===
Nearly all cervical cancer cases are caused by high-risk HPV strains. Cytology is now commonly performed alongside molecular testing with the HPV co-test, a combination of the Pap test and HPV test. This co-test can now be completed every 5-years to satisfy cervical cancer screening for women aged 30-65. This is a more sensitive method of testing than the Pap test or HPV test alone.

== Non-cervical Gynecologic Cytology ==
Cytology also has a prominent diagnostic role in gynecologic specimens beyond cervical cancer screening. This includes pos-surgical surveillance for gynecologic malignancies. Notably, FNAs are not the first line methodology in ovarian tumors due to the risk of tumor spread, but can be used in the event of inoperable tumors and for determining the extent of metastases. Endometrial aspirational smears can be indicated for postmenopausal bleeding or suspected malignancy. Similarly vaginal and vulvar smears are performed to identify malignant cells from different parts of the female genital tract and also for hormonal assessment.

== Implications of AI and Digital Cytology ==
Traditional cytological screening is very labor-intensive. Recent developments in the field of digital pathology have been important in the evolution of cytology. Although machine learning has already been involved with cervical screenings since the 1990s, AI-driven whole slide imaging (WSI) platforms have recently elevated the field through automated screening algorithms that can more efficiently identify and prioritize abnormal cells for review. Cervical cytology has notably benefited from AI-assisted interpretation. Digital pathology is a rising tool in the broader pathology field, and has the potential to further improve gynecologic cytology and improve accessibility to care.
