= Cytopathology =

Branch of pathology that studies and diagnoses diseases on the cellular level

A pair of micrographs of a cytopathology specimen showing a 3-dimensional cluster of cancerous cells (serous carcinoma)

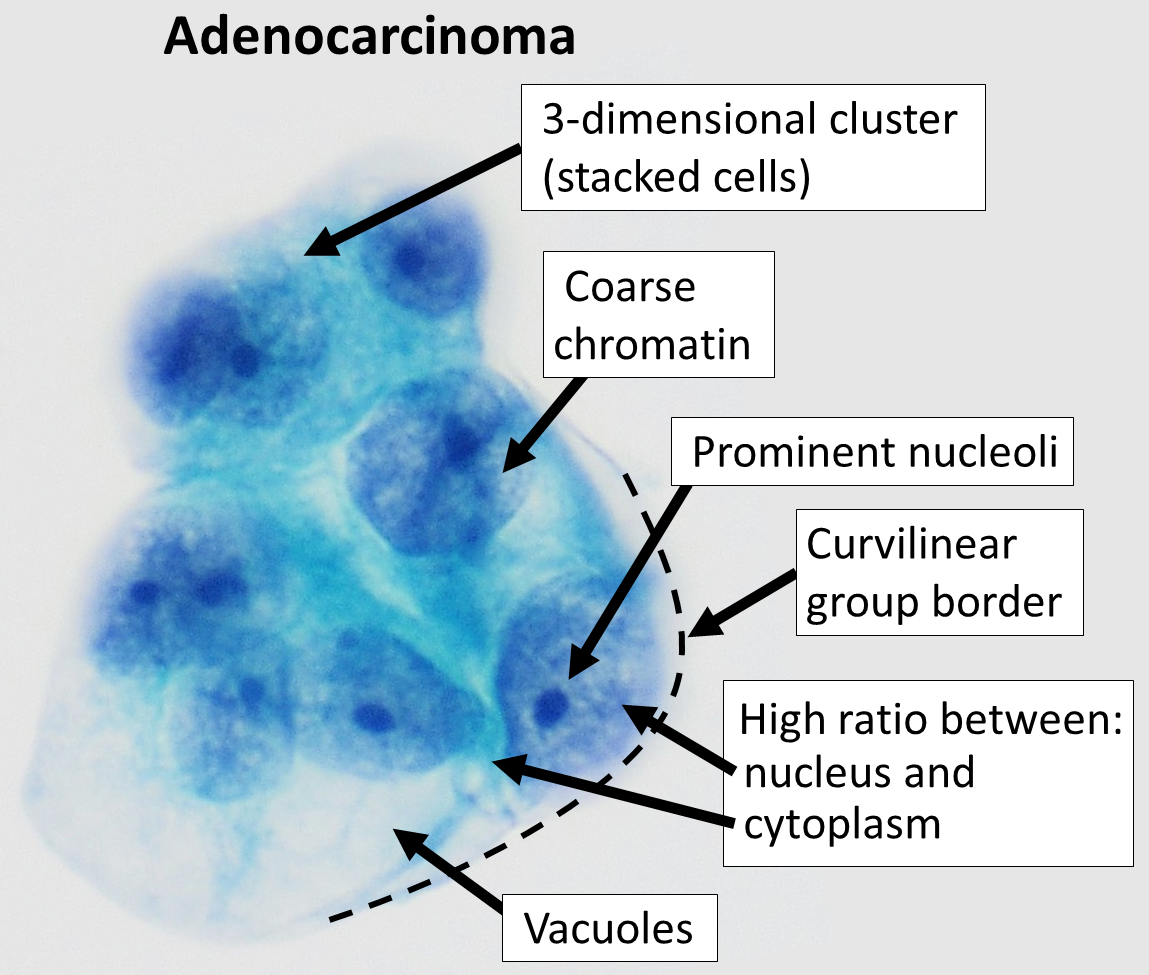
An adenocarcinoma with typical features as can be seen on cytopathology

Cytopathology (from Greek κύτος, kytos, "a hollow"; πάθος, pathos, "fate, harm"; and -λογία, -logia) is a branch of pathology that studies and diagnoses diseases on the cellular level. The discipline was founded by George Nicolas Papanicolaou in 1928. Cytopathology is generally used on samples of free cells or tissue fragments, in contrast to histopathology, which studies whole tissues. Cytopathology is frequently, less precisely, called "cytology", which means "the study of cells".

Cytopathology is commonly used to investigate diseases involving a wide range of body sites, often to aid in the diagnosis of cancer but also in the diagnosis of some infectious diseases and other inflammatory conditions. For example, a common application of cytopathology is the Pap smear, a screening tool used to detect precancerous cervical lesions that may lead to cervical cancer.

Cytopathologic tests are sometimes called smear tests because the samples may be smeared across a glass microscope slide for subsequent staining and microscopic examination. However, cytology samples may be prepared in other ways, including cytocentrifugation. Different types of smear tests may also be used for cancer diagnosis. In this sense, it is termed a cytologic smear.

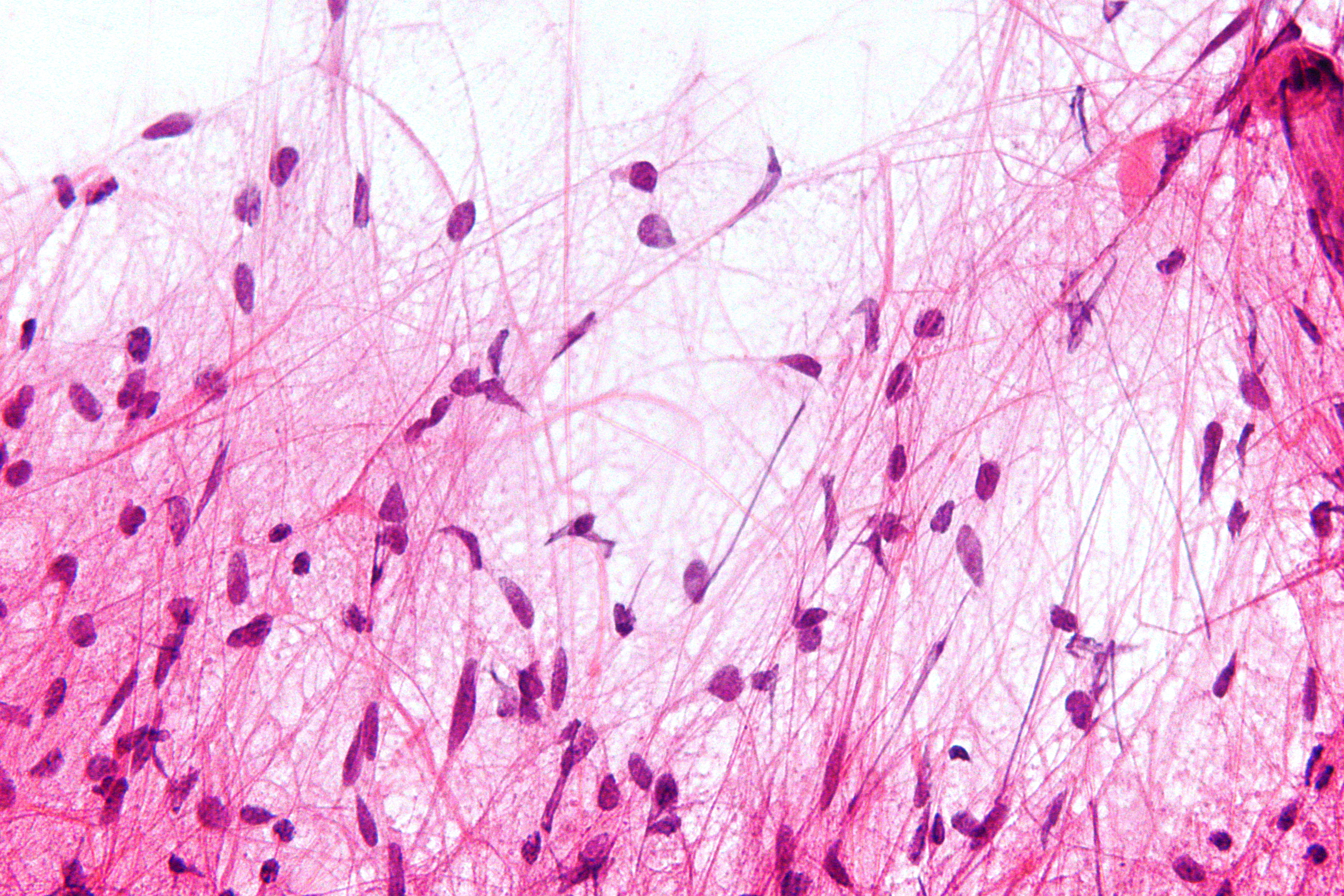
Micrograph of a pilocytic astrocytoma, showing characteristic bipolar cells with long pilocytic (hair-like) processes. Smear preparation. H&E stain

== Cell collection ==
There are two methods of collecting cells for cytopathologic analysis: exfoliative cytology, and intervention cytology.

=== Exfoliative cytology ===
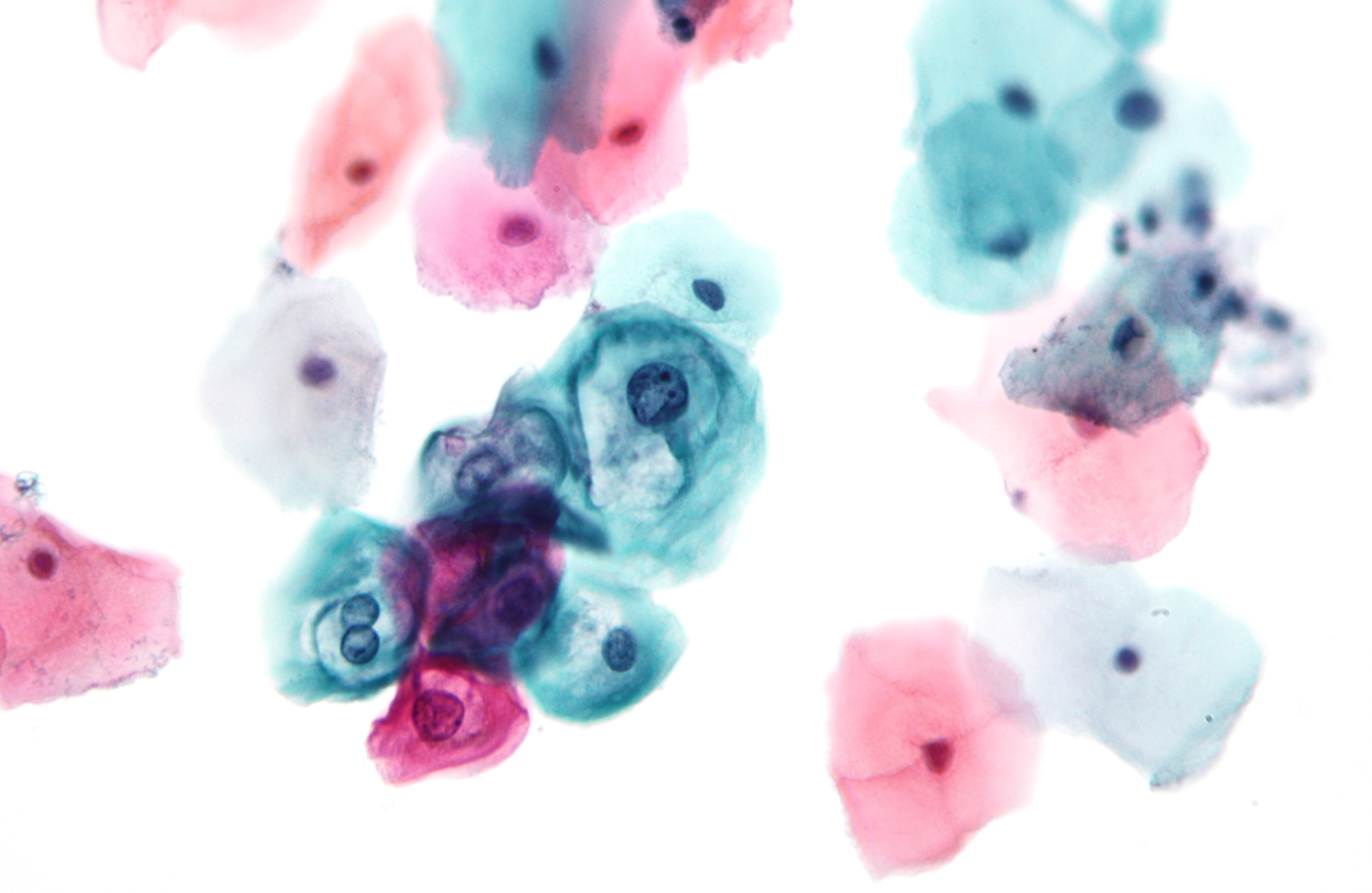
A micrograph of an exfoliative cytopathology specimen (Pap test, Pap stain)

In this method, cells are collected after they have been either spontaneously shed by the body ("spontaneous exfoliation"), or manually scraped/brushed off of a surface in the body ("mechanical exfoliation"). An example of spontaneous exfoliation is when cells of the pleural cavity or peritoneal cavity are shed into the pleural or peritoneal fluid. This fluid can be collected via various methods for examination. Examples of mechanical exfoliation include Pap smears, where cells are scraped from the cervix with a cervical spatula, or bronchial brushings, where a bronchoscope is inserted into the trachea and used to evaluate a visible lesion by brushing cells from its surface and subjecting them to cytopathologic analysis.

=== Intervention cytology ===
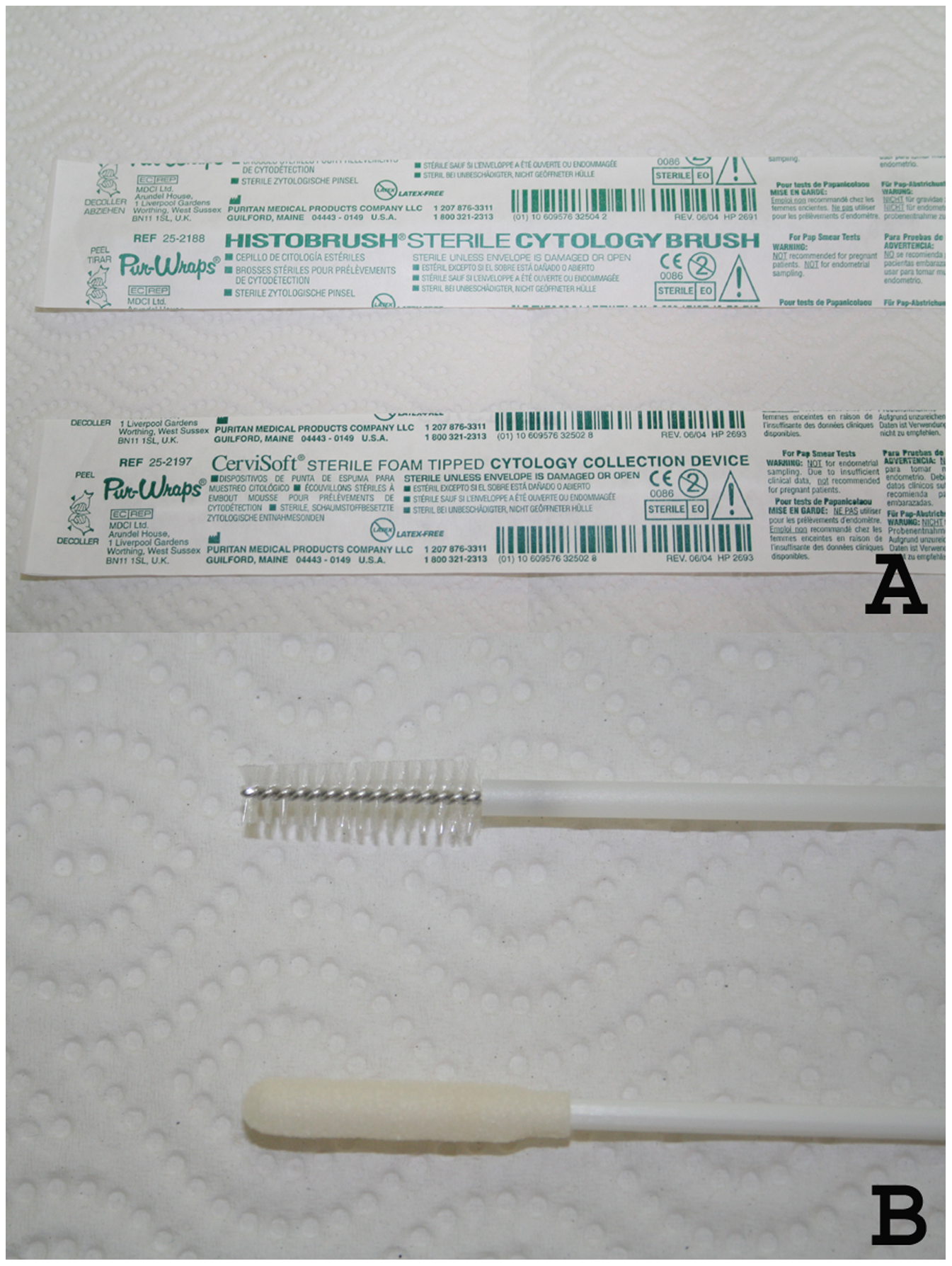
Brushes used to collect samples for cytology.

In intervention cytology the pathologist intervenes into the body for sample collection.

==== Fine-needle aspiration ====
Fine-needle aspiration, or fine-needle aspiration cytology (FNAC), involves the use of a needle attached to a syringe to collect cells from lesions or masses in various body organs, often with the application of negative pressure (suction) to increase yield. FNAC can be performed under palpation guidance (i.e., the clinician can feel the lesion) on a mass in superficial regions like the neck, thyroid or breast; FNAC may be assisted by ultrasound or CAT scan for sampling of deep-seated lesions within the body that cannot be localized via palpation. FNAC is widely used in many countries, but success rate is dependent on the skill of the practitioner. If performed by a pathologist alone, or as team with pathologist-cytotechnologist, the success rate of proper diagnosis is higher than when performed by a non-pathologist. This may be due to the pathologist's ability to immediately evaluate specimens under a microscope and immediately repeat the procedure if sampling was inadequate.

Fine needles are 23 to 27 gauge. Because needles as small as 27 gauge can almost always yield diagnostic material, FNAC is often the least injurious way to obtain diagnostic tissue from a lesion. Sometimes a syringe holder may be used to facilitate using one hand to perform the biopsy while the other hand is immobilizing the mass. Imaging equipment such as a CT scanner or ultrasound may be used to assist in locating the region to be biopsied.

FNAC has become synonymous to interventional cytology.

==== Sediment cytology ====
For cytology of sediment, the sample is collected from the fixative that was used for processing the biopsy or autopsy specimen. The fixative is mixed properly and taken into a centrifuge tube and is centrifuged. The sediment is used for smearing. These sediments are the cells that are shed by the autopsy and biopsy specimen during processing.

=== Imprint cytology ===
Imprint cytology is a preparation wherein the tissue of interest touches a glass slide, leaving behind its imprint in the form of cells on the slide. The imprint can subsequently be stained and studied.

== Preparation ==
After sampling, two main techniques for processing are used:

- Smearing of sample directly onto a glass slide.
- Liquid-based cytology. With the latter, the sample is placed in a liquid that is then processed for further investigation.

Processing of specimens may result in visual artifacts:

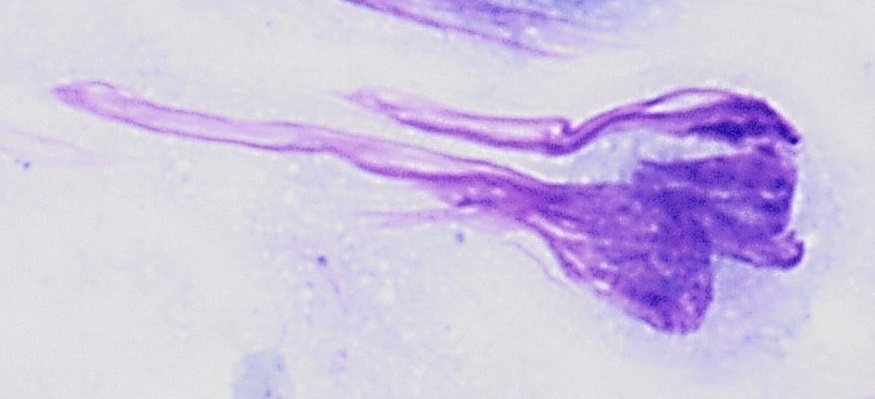
Smearing of cells across a glass plate may cause smearing artifacts, such as the nuclear smearing of this monocyte, shown as tail-like extension of nuclear material.

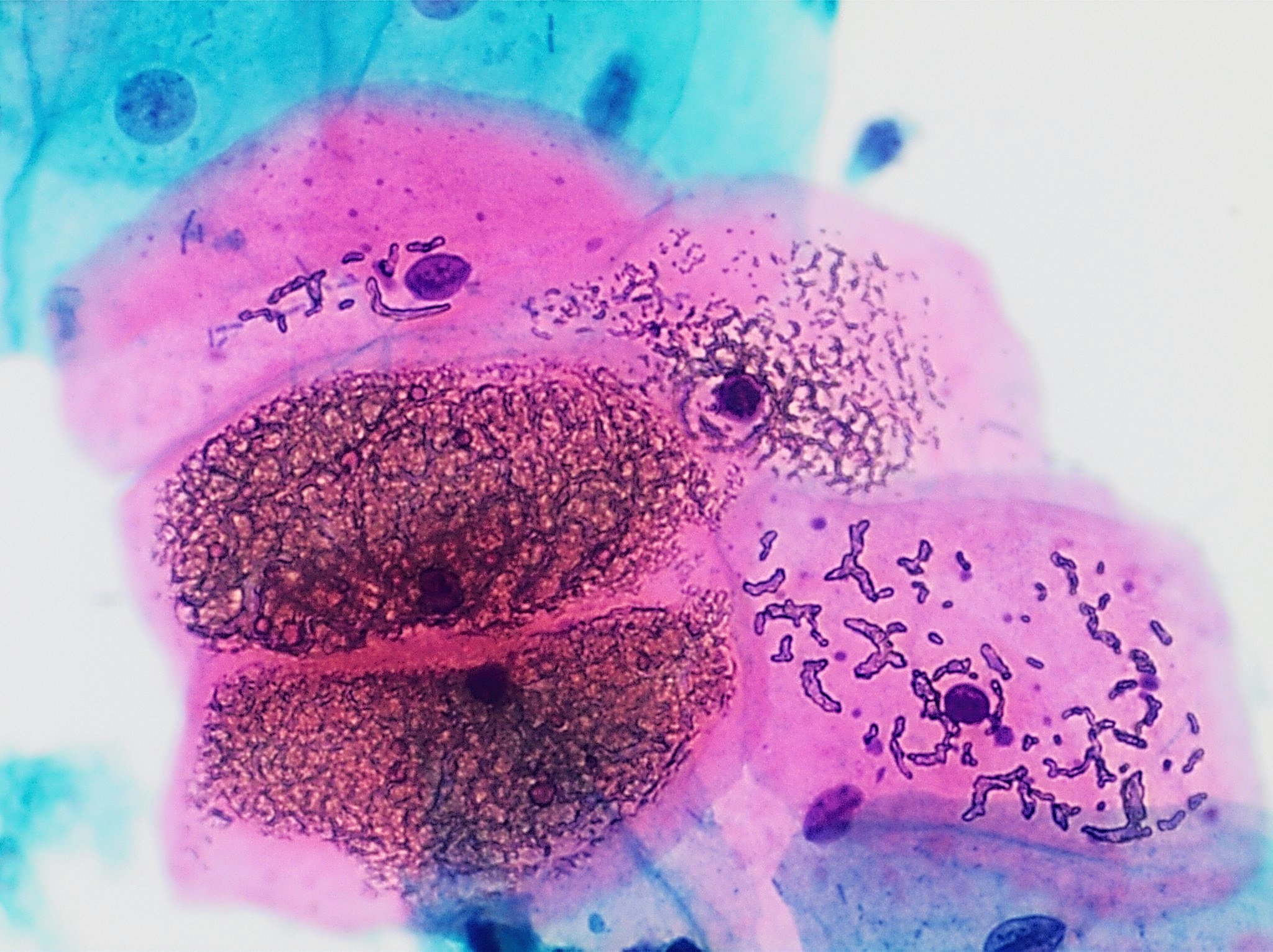
Cervical squamous cells with cornflake artifact, when some mounting medium evaporates before coverslipping.

For better visualization of cells and their components, specimens are inked, such as by the Papanicolaou stain, or Romanowsky stain derivatives which include Giemsa, Jenner, Wright, Field, May–Grünwald and Leishman stains.

== Parameters ==
The nucleus of the cell is very important in evaluating the cellular sample. In cancerous cells, altered DNA activity can be seen as a physical change in the nuclear qualities. Since more DNA is unfolded and being expressed, the nucleus will be darker and less uniform, larger than in normal cells, and often show a bright-red nucleolus.

While the cytologist's primary responsibility is to discern whether cancerous or precancerous pathology is present in the cellular sample analysed, other pathologies may be seen such as:

- microbial infections: parasitic, viral, and/or bacterial
- reactive changes
- immune reactions
- cell aging
- amyloidosis
- autoimmune diseases

Various normal functions of cell growth, metabolism, and division can fail or work in abnormal ways and lead to diseases.

Cytopathology is best used as one of three tools, the second and third being the physical examination and medical imaging. Cytology can be used to diagnose a condition and spare a patient from surgery to obtain a larger specimen. An example is thyroid FNAC; many benign conditions can be diagnosed with a superficial biopsy and the patient can go back to normal activities right away. If a malignant condition is diagnosed, the patient may be able to start radiation/chemotherapy, or may need to have surgery to remove and/or stage the cancer.

Some tumors may be difficult to biopsy, such as sarcomas. Other rare tumors may be dangerous to biopsy, such as pheochromocytoma. In general, a fine-needle aspiration can be done anywhere it is safe to put a needle, including liver, lung, kidney, and superficial masses.

Proper cytopathology technique takes time to master. Cytotechnologists and cytopathologists can assist clinicians by assisting with sample collection. A "quick read" is a peek under the microscope and can tell the clinician whether enough diagnostic material was obtained. Cytological specimens must be properly prepared so that the cells are not damaged.

Further information about the specimen may be gained by immunohistochemical stains and molecular testing, particularly if the sample is prepared using liquid based cytology. Often "reflex" testing is performed, such as HPV testing on an abnormal pap test or flow cytometry on a lymphoma specimen.

== Body regions ==
Cytopathologic techniques are used in the examination of virtually all body organs and tissues:

- Gynecologic cytology – concerning the female reproductive tract
- Urinary tract cytology – concerning the ureters, urinary bladder and urethra. See Urine cytology.
- Effusion cytology – concerning fluids collections, especially within the peritoneum, pleura and pericardium
- Breast cytology – principally concerning the female breast
- Vaginal cytology — principally concerning non-human mammals
- Thyroid cytology – concerning the thyroid gland
- Lymph node cytology – concerning lymph nodes
- Respiratory cytology – concerning the lungs and airways
- Gastrointestinal cytology – concerning the alimentary tract
- Soft tissue, bone and skin cytology
- Kidney and adrenal cytology
- Liver and pancreas cytology
- Central nervous system cytology
- Eye cytology
- Salivary gland cytology

== See also ==
- American Society of Cytopathology
- Anatomical pathology
- Cancer Cytopathology
- Cell biology
- Clinical pathology
- Pleomorphism
