= Death of Kathryn Hinnant =

1989 murder in New York City

The death of Kathryn Hinnant occurred on January 7, 1989, at Bellevue Hospital. Hinnant, a pathologist, was strangled by a homeless man who had been squatting in the hospital.

== Background ==
Kathryn Hinnant worked at the New York University Medical School as a researcher in cytopathology. She had an office on the fourth floor of the pathology wing at Bellevue.

Steven Smith was a homeless man with a history of psychiatric problems and an addiction to cocaine. He had twice been admitted to Bellevue in late 1988 after ingesting rat poison but had been released. He subsequently began squatting in the hospital, dressing as a doctor in order to blend in.

== Murder ==
On January 7, 1989, Hinnant was in her office at Bellevue preparing a lecture. Smith entered her office, beat her, raped her, and strangled her with a cord. Her body was found at 6 the next morning by her husband and a hospital staff member. She was five months pregnant at the time of her death.

== Investigation and trial ==
Mayor Edward Koch referred to the case as "the number one to be solved"; 50 detectives were reportedly tasked with catching the killer, whom the media had taken to referring to as the "Beast of Bellevue". Several days later, Smith was located and arrested with Hinnant's credit cards.

Smith was tried on a charge of first-degree murder and presented an insanity plea. The jury did not believe his defense and found him guilty, resulting in a sentence of life in prison. Smith stated he would have preferred to receive the death penalty.

== Legacy ==
The murder was one of several incidents of security breaches at Bellevue Hospital, dating back decades. Hinnant's family sued Bellevue for wrongful death, alleging negligence on the part of the hospital in failing to provide adequate security. The family refused a proposed settlement but the case was ultimately decided against them.

== Sources ==
- Oshinsky, David (2016). Bellevue: three centuries of medicine and mayhem at America's most storied hospital. Doubleday.
