= Vaginal cytology =

Vaginal cytology is a microscopic examination of cells from the vaginal epithelium. In veterinary medicine, it helps differentiate the stages of the mammalian estrous cycle because the vaginal epithelium changes in response to sex hormone levels; practically, it is used to distinguish when a female canine is at a particular point in the estrous cycle. In a normal vaginal smear, lactational cells, navicular cells, endocervical cells, endometrial cells, trophoblastic cells, and leucocytes may be present.

The equipment needed for vaginal cytology includes a vaginal speculum, cotton-tipped applicators, frosted microscope slides, commercial Romanowsky stain, and light microscope.

== See also ==
- Canine reproduction
- Reproductive cycle
- Cytopathology
