= Vinegar test =

Test for cervical cancer

- Purpose: test for cervical cancer

Vinegar test is a cervical cancer testing method that uses acetic acid, a major component of vinegar. It has been found to be useful as an effective and inexpensive screening test. It has the potential, say researchers from the University of Zimbabwe and Johns Hopkins University, to improve the chances of preventing cancer in developing world. The technique, termed VIA (Visual Inspection with Acetic Acid)/Cryo, was endorsed by the World Health Organization in 2010. Vinegar is brushed on a woman's cervix and precancerous spots turn white. These can be instantly frozen off with a metallic probe cooled with dry ice. Vinegar highlights tumors, which have more DNA, and therefore less water and more protein, than healthy tissue. As of 2011, Thailand has adopted the technique in twenty-nine of its (then) seventy-five provinces, and 500,000 women have been tested at least once.

The vinegar test does have important limitations and disadvantages for cervical cancer screening, such as high false positive results.
