= Screening of potential sperm bank donors =

In sperm banks, screening of potential sperm donors typically includes screening for genetic diseases, chromosomal abnormalities and sexually transmitted infections (STDs) that may be transmitted through the donor's sperm. The screening process generally also includes a quarantine period, during which samples are frozen and stored for at least six months after which the donor will be re-tested for STIs. This is to ensure no new infections have been acquired or have developed during since the donation. If the result is negative, the sperm samples can be released from quarantine and used in treatments.

The screening process and requirements vary significantly between jurisdictions. In the United States, the screening procedures are regulated by the FDA, the ASRM, the American Association of Tissue Banks, and the CDC. The screening regulations are more stringent today than they have been in the past. In Europe, the screening procedures are regulated by the EU Tissue Directive.

== Components ==
The CDC standards for sperm donor screening require:

- Taking a medical history of the donor, his children, siblings, parents, and grandparents, etc. for three to four generations back. This is often done in conjunction with the patient's family doctor.
- HIV risk assessment interview, asking about sexual activity and any past drug use.
- Blood tests and urine tests for infectious diseases, such as:
  - HIV-1/2 see sections below
  - HTLV-1/2
  - Hepatitis B
  - Hepatitis C
  - Syphilis
  - Gonorrhea
  - Chlamydia
  - Cytomegalovirus (CMV) see sections below, although not all clinics test for this.
- Blood and urine tests for blood typing and general health indicators: ABO/Rh typing, CBC, liver panel and urinalysis
- Complete physical examination including careful examination of the penis, scrotum and testicles.
- Genetic testing for carrier traits, for example:
  - Cystic fibrosis
  - Sickle cell disease
  - Thalassemia
  - Other hemoglobin-related blood disorders.
  - Cystic fibrosis carrier screening, chromosome analyses, and hemoglobin evaluations are performed on the majority of sperm donor applicants in the United States. Donors of Jewish, French Canadian, or Cajun descent may also get genetic testing for the carrier trait of Tay–Sachs disease, but there is significant variation in screening for other disorders that occur with increased frequency in this population.
- General health
- Semen analysis for:
  - Sperm count
  - Morphology
  - Motility
  - Acrosome activity may also be tested

=== Cytomegalovirus ===
Screening for cytomegalovirus is not mandatory in all jurisdictions, and positive donors may still donate at sperm banks.

Donor screening for cytomegalovirus (CMV) is carried out by testing for IgG antibodies against CMV that are produced if the donor ever has contracted CMV, which is the case in between 50% and 80% of adults. Such antibody-positive individuals may potentially shed virus that remain latent in the body in the semen, infecting the mother and, in turn, the embryo/fetus. Most babies will not be harmed by the virus, but a small percentage may develop neurological abnormalities. However, the risk of acquiring CMV infection from an antibody-positive sperm donor is believed to be extremely low, at least where sperm banks perform follow-up tests on antibody-positive donors for type IgM antibodies that indicate current or recent CMV infection, and where sperm preparations are performed that decrease the amount of white blood cells in the samples, e.g. in samples prepared for IUI.

== Failures ==
In 1995, the largest sperm bank in New York State was ordered to close (and no longer operate semen banks and blood banks), over the objections of its owner the Daxor Corporation and its president, CEO, and majority shareholder Joseph Feldschuh, by New York State Supreme Court Justice Harold Tompkins. The Justice found that Daxor had repeatedly endangered the public health over several years. A 1993 inspection had documented 517 violations by the sperm bank, including its failure to screen sperm donors properly for sexually transmitted diseases. Rather, the inspection showed that Daxor had, in fact, made available semen from men who had tested positive for hepatitis, chlamydia, and gonorrhea. Daxor employees told government investigators that Feldschuh had instructed them to make false entries on business records and to lie to investigators. Feldschuh claimed New York State Health Department officials were conspiring to shut down his business, sued them three times, appealed three times, and lost each of the six times.

The Daxor sperm bank was sued for negligence by customers. In one case, a White mother sued the sperm bank because though her White terminally ill husband's sperm had been stored at the sperm bank, when she asked for the sperm and used it to artificially inseminate her, she ended up giving birth to a Black baby. In 2007 another mother settled her own claims against Daxor for $250,000, which she said was a fraction of the estimated $7 million in care that will be needed for both of her children. She said the Daxor donor of the sperm that she used had lied significantly about his education, and had failed to disclose that he was diagnosed with ADHD, did not speak until age 3, and attended a special school for children with learning and emotional disabilities; she said using his sperm led to both of her children being diagnosed with autism.

== Quarantine ==
Washing techniques are developing that purify sperm from viral load of HIV and hepatitis C, but nevertheless clinics do not offer sperm from carriers of significant STIs.

== Sperm donation and reduced birth defects ==
Children conceived through sperm donation have a birth defect rate of almost a fifth compared with the general population. This may be explained by the fact that sperm banks only accept donors who have good semen quality, and because of the rigorous screening procedures which they adopt, including a typical age limitation on sperm donors, often limiting sperm donors to the ages of 21–39 (see paternal age effect), and genetic and health screening of donors. In addition, sperm banks may try to ensure that the sperm used in a particular recipient woman comes from a donor whose blood group and genetic profile is compatible with those of the woman.

== Sperm donation and rhesus incompatibility ==
Sperm donation is also used in cases of rhesus incompatibility. This particularly occurs where a woman has a blood type which is rhesus negative, and where her partner is rhesus positive. The woman's body may reject a fetus if it has rhesus positive blood. Anti D injections have been developed and may be used to attempt to avoid this, and these are usually automatically given to rhesus negative women immediately after they give birth to their first child. However, in the past this was either not possible or was not always routinely undertaken where a woman gave birth or had an abortion and she may have trouble carrying a child later in life. Furthermore, for some women, the anti D injection does not provide the entire solution, particularly where there is a medical history of complications during pregnancy which risk the woman's blood and that of the fetus becoming mixed. In such cases, sperm from a rhesus negative donor can provide the solution and a woman may be able to conceive and carry a pregnancy to full term when otherwise this would not be possible. For this reason, sperm from rhesus negative sperm donors is often in great demand, particularly those with the O negative blood group who are universal donors.
