= Cytocentrifuge =

Laboratory equipment

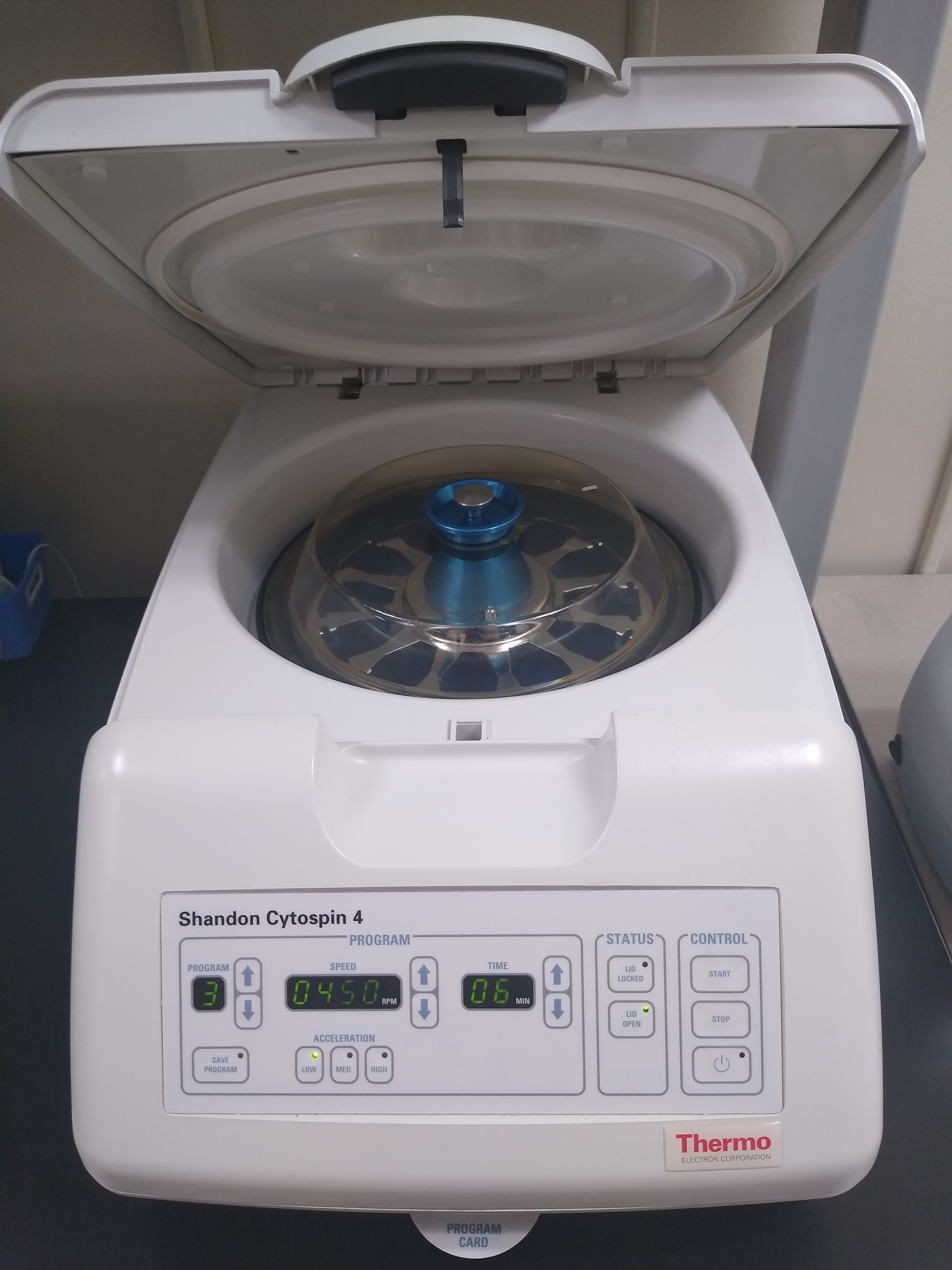
Example of a cytocentrifuge

A cytocentrifuge, sometimes referred to as a cytospin, is a specialized centrifuge used to concentrate cells in fluid specimens onto a microscope slide so that they can be stained and examined. Cytocentrifuges are used in various areas of the clinical laboratory, such as cytopathology, hematology and microbiology, as well as in biological research. The method can be used on many different types of specimens, including fine needle aspirates, cerebrospinal fluid, serous and synovial fluid, and urine.

== Procedure ==
To prepare cytocentrifuge smears, a funnel assembly is attached to the front of a microscope slide. The surface of the funnel assembly that is in contact with the slide is lined with filter paper to absorb excess fluid. A few drops of fluid are placed in the funnel. The assembly is placed in the cytocentrifuge, which operates at a low force (600–800 x g) to preserve cellular structure. Centrifugal force pushes the fluid through the funnel's opening and concentrates the cells in a small area of the slide. The centrifugation process concentrates cells by about twenty-fold and creates a one-cell-thick monolayer, allowing for assessment of cellular morphology. The slide can then be fixed and stained.

== Applications ==
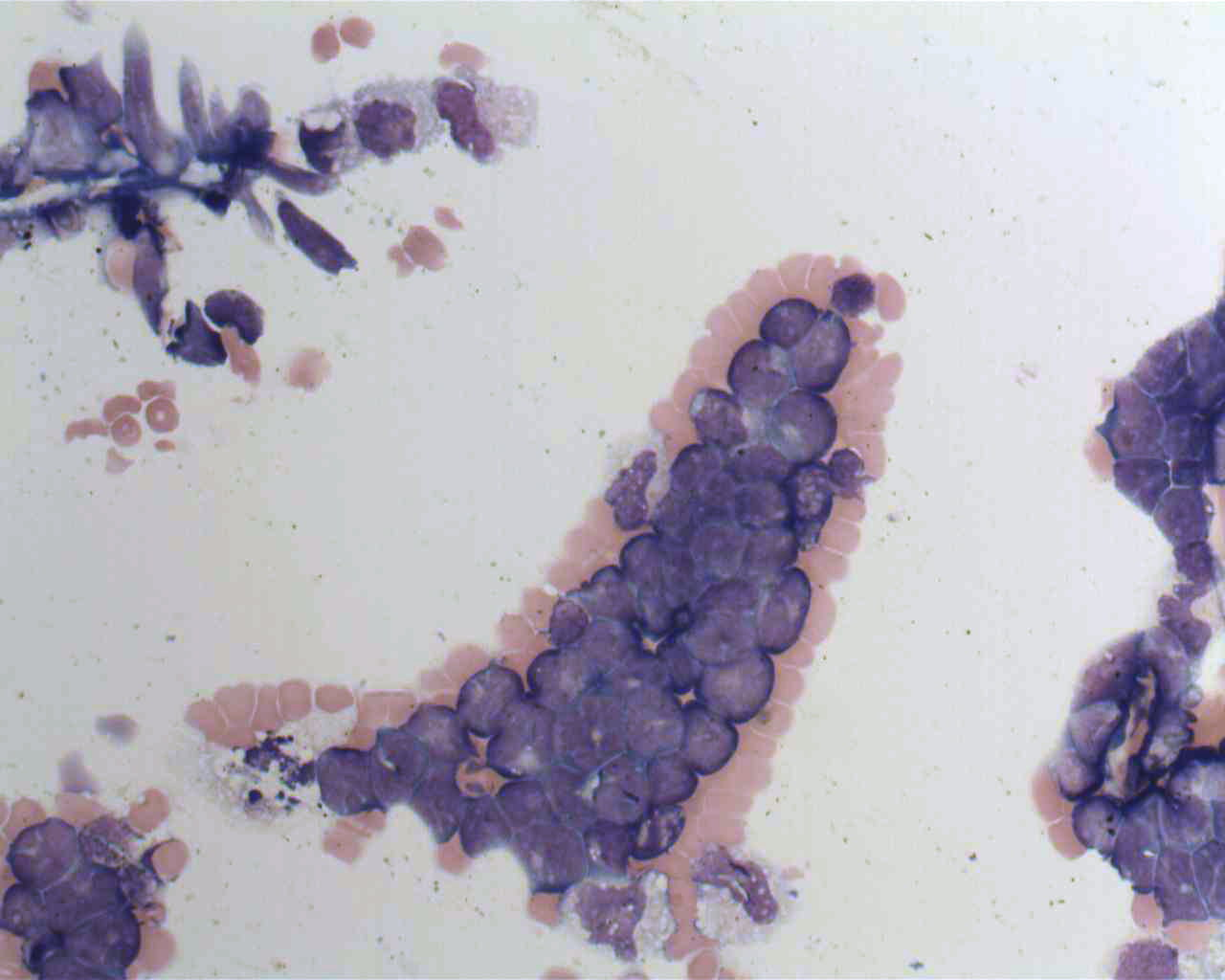
Lymphoma cells in cerebrospinal fluid

Some applications of cytocentrifuges include:

- Performing differential cell counts on body fluids, such as serous, synovial and cerebrospinal fluid
- Cytopathology examination of liquid specimens such as body fluids and fine needle aspirates
- Gram staining of fluid specimens for identification of microorganisms

== Limitations ==
The cytocentrifugation process can cause cells to appear distorted. Cells located at the centre of the smear may look compressed compared to cells at the periphery. Cell nuclei may develop artifactual clefts, lobes, or holes, and the cytoplasm may appear vacuolated or develop irregular projections. Cytoplasmic granules may be pushed to the periphery of the cell. If the cell count is high, cells may be distorted due to crowding; therefore, samples with high cell counts are diluted prior to smear preparation.

== History ==
Examination of cells in body fluids was historically performed using a hemocytometer, a chamber designed for counting cells microscopically. This technique was limited by poor discrimination between cell types (cells could only be classified as mononuclear or polymorphonuclear) and the low number of cells present in unconcentrated body fluids. Moreover, this technique did not produce a permanent record of the specimen. In a 1966 paper, Watson P. described the first cytocentrifuge, calling it "an apparatus for concentrating cells in suspension onto a microscope slide". The device was sold commercially in the 1970s and in 1983 it was patented by Shandon (now Thermo Scientific). As of 2012, numerous brands of cytocentrifuge exist on the market.
