= Cervical screening =

Type of medical screening

Cervical screening involves a clinician taking samples of cells from the cervix.

Cervical screening assesses cellular abnormalities within the cervix, and/or looking for viral DNA.

Cervical cancer screening is a medical screening test designed to identify risk of cervical cancer. Cervical screening may involve looking for viral DNA, and/or identifying abnormal, potentially precancerous cells within the cervix as well as cells that have progressed to early stages of cervical cancer. One goal of cervical screening is to allow for intervention and treatment so abnormal lesions can be removed before progression to cancer. An additional goal is to decrease mortality from cervical cancer by identifying cancerous lesions in their early stages and providing treatment before progression to more invasive disease.

Currently available screening tests fall into three categories: molecular, cytologic, and visual inspection. Molecular screening tests include nucleic acid amplification tests (NAAT), which identify high-risk human papillomavirus (HPV) strains. Cytologic tests include conventional Pap smear and liquid-based cytology. Visual Inspection tests involve application of a solution to enhance identification of abnormal areas and can utilize the naked eye or a colposcope/magnifying camera.

Medical organizations of different countries have unique guidelines and screening recommendations. The World Health Organization has also published guidelines to increase screening and improve outcomes for all women, taking into consideration differences in resource availability of regions. Management of abnormal screening results can include surveillance, biopsy, or removal of the suspicious region via surgical intervention. Diagnosis of more advanced cancer stages may require other treatment options such as chemotherapy or radiation.

== General screening procedure ==
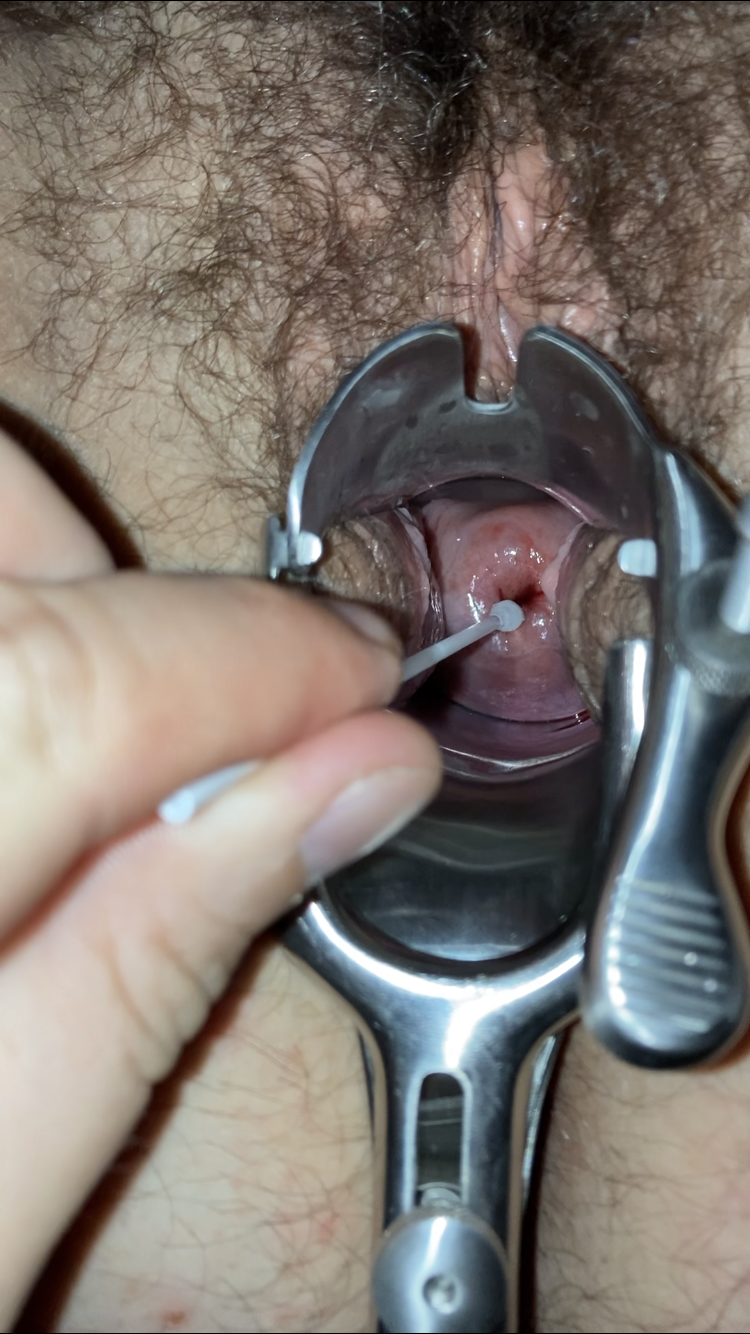
Sample collection for thin-prep-cytology from the cervix uteri of a 39-years-old multiparous woman. The cervical brush is visible just before entering the cervix uteri.

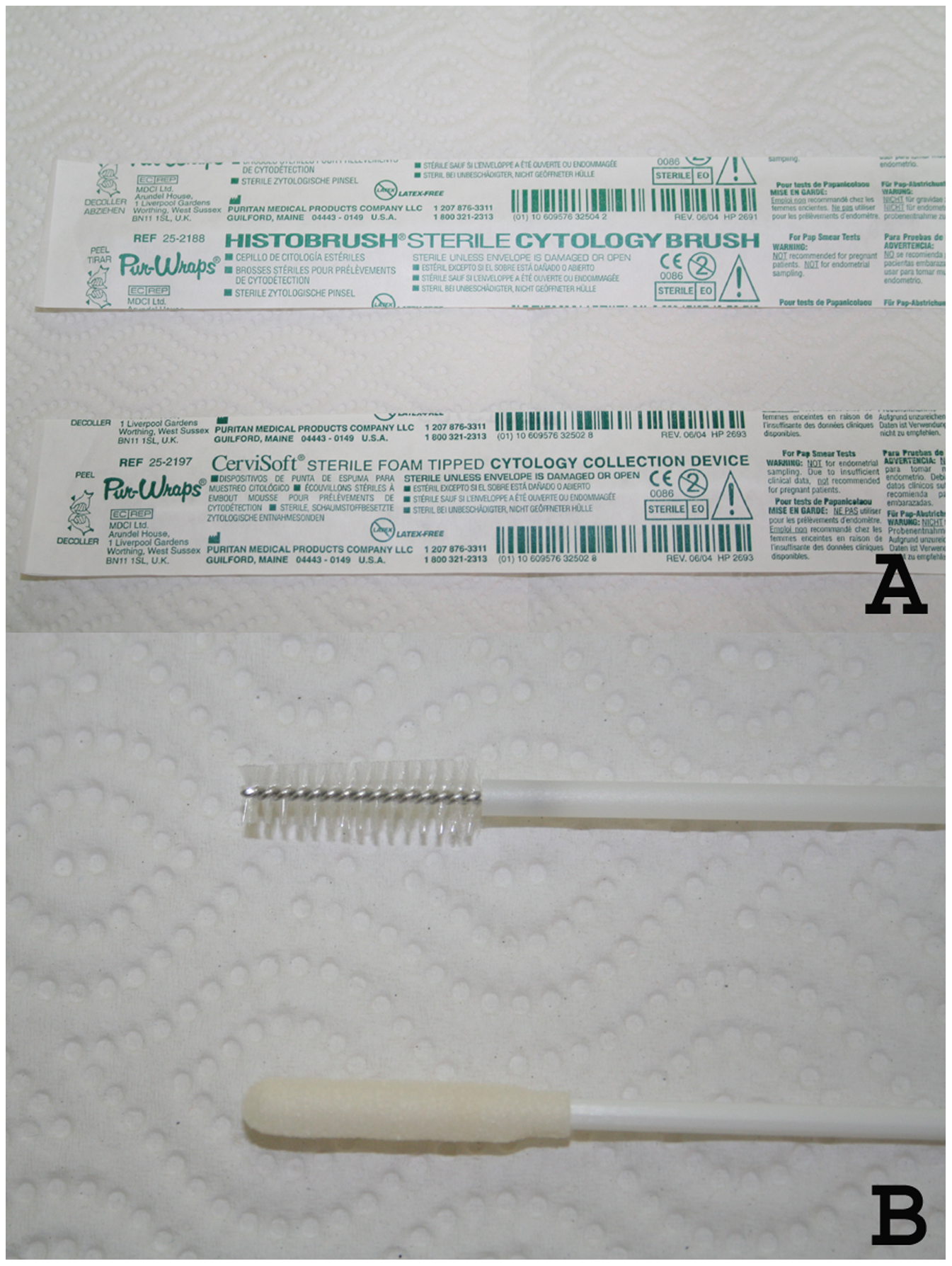
Brush utilized in cervical screening exams to collect samples

The procedures for testing women using Pap smear, liquid-based cytology, or HPV testing are similar. A sample of cells is collected from the cervix using a spatula or small brush. The cells are then checked for any abnormalities.

To take a sample of cells, the healthcare clinician inserts an instrument, called a speculum, inside the vagina. The speculum has two arms that spread the walls of the vagina apart to see the cervix. Then, they scrape the surface of the cervix with a spatula or small brush. This collects a sample of cells from the outer layer of the cervix.

Self-collection is also an option when testing by a provider is unavailable or uncomfortable for a patient. When utilizing HPV testing, self-collection is as accurate as swabbing by a provider. This equality has not been demonstrated for other testing, such as pap smear or liquid-based cytology.

With a Pap smear, cells collected using a spatula are smeared onto a slide for examination under a microscope. In liquid-based cytology, a sample of cells is taken using a small brush. The cells are put into a container of liquid and analysed for abnormalities. Cervical cells to be tested for HPV are collected similarly.

== Types of screening ==
=== Molecular ===
Molecular testing identifies an infection called human papillomavirus, or HPV. Human papillomavirus (HPV) infection is a cause of nearly all cases of cervical cancer. Most women will successfully clear HPV infections within 18 months. Those that have a prolonged infection with a high-risk type (e.g. types 16, 18, 31, 45) are more likely to develop Cervical Intraepithelial Neoplasia, due to the effects that HPV has on DNA.

The screening process utilizes nucleic acid amplification testing to look for DNA or RNA of the virus present within cervical cells. Some tests can identify up to 14 different types of high-risk strains.

Accuracy of HPV testing report:

- sensitivity 88% to 91% (for detecting CIN 3 or higher) to 97% (for detecting CIN2+)
- specificity 73% to 79% (for detecting CIN 3 or higher) to 93% (for detecting CIN2+)

=== Cytologic ===
==== Conventional Pap smear ====
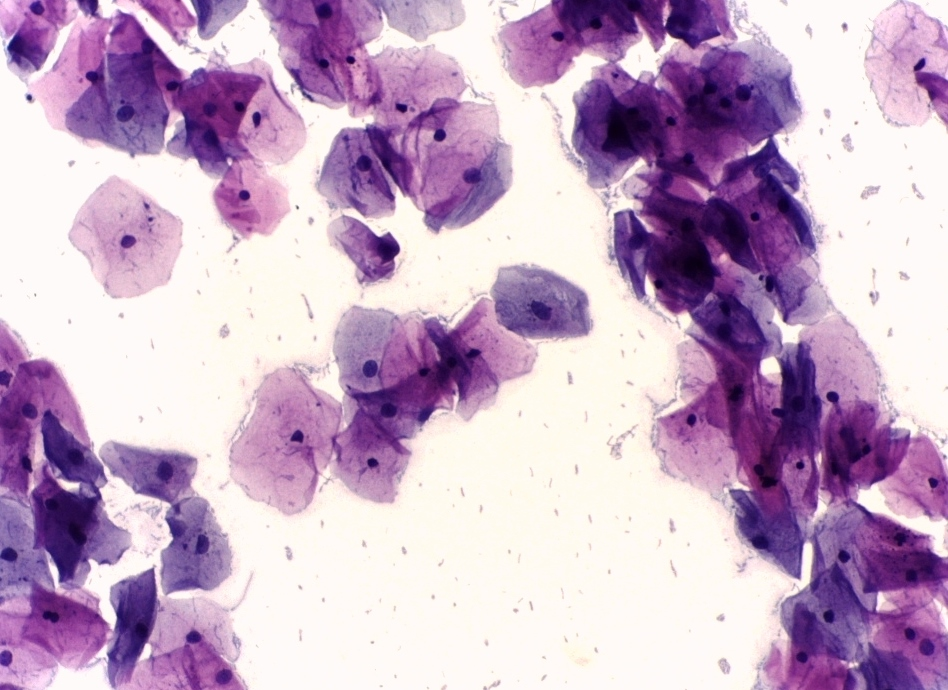
Normal cervical cells in a Pap smear

In the conventional Pap smear, the collected cells are smeared on a microscope slide, and a fixative is applied. The slide is evaluated in a pathology lab to identify cellular abnormalities.

Accuracy of conventional cytology report:

- sensitivity: 55% to 88%
- specificity: 71% to 94%

==== Liquid-based monolayer cytology ====
In liquid-based monolayer cytology, the collected cells are placed into a liquid medium. The sample is evaluated in a pathology lab to evaluate cellular abnormalities.

Accuracy of liquid based monolayer cytology report:

- sensitivity 57% to 90%
- specificity 64% to 97%

=== Visual inspection ===
Visual inspection involves the application of ascetic acid or Lugol's iodine solution to the cervix. These solutions highlight abnormal areas for easier identification with the naked eye. Visual inspection can include receiving a colposcopy if results from cytologic screenings produce abnormal results. A magnifying camera called a colposcope can also be utilized for clearer viewing when available. Through visual inspection, abnormalities can be detected within the cervix. If detected, abnormal tissue can then be sampled and taken for further testing.

=== Combination testing (co-testing) ===
Combination testing, or co-testing, is when individuals receive both molecular high-risk HPV testing and cytology. These results can be utilized to calculate the patient's immediate risk for cervical intraepithelial neoplasia grade 3 or cancer (CIN3+).

The calculated risk can be used to recommend appropriate follow-up options.

== Recommendations ==
Cervical screening demographics are largely measured by motives or reasons for participation and thus vary between age, socio-economic status, race, location, and ethnicity. In practice, cervical screenings are often undergone to test for cervical cancer, but are dually used to test for other conditions such as STIs, inflammation, and precancerous cells.

Cervical screenings typically begin at ages 21–25, with the recommended age being 21. Testing for cervical cancer should occur at least every 3 years, and HPV every 5 years. However, if test results are abnormal, healthcare providers may suggest more frequent screenings. If patients are sexually active, recommendations for screenings may change or vary as increased sexual activity is a strong risk factor for developing HPV.

Public health screening interventions that are available for cervical cancer screening globally include: cytology-based screening, visual screening, HPV DNA testing, colposcopy, and spectroscopic techniques.

Cervical cancer has a distinct disparity in diagnosis associated with access to care, specifically access to cervical screening. This disparity is reflected in higher rates of cervical cancer found among minority groups in countries with higher economic status, as well as higher rates of cervical cancer found in lower-income global areas in comparison to advantaged groups. Globally, cervical cancer is most prominent in developing countries, with 80% of cases globally occurring within lower socio-economic countries. Within the US, there is a significant disparity in rates of cervical cancer diagnosis among black women compared to white women, with mortality rates of black women with cervical cancer being severely underestimated. In light of such disparities, appropriate screening and greater efforts towards intervention are highly recommended.

Recent studies show that using the health belief model, self-efficacy, knowledge of benefits, and knowledge of susceptibility were associated with higher cervical screening rates. These individuals tend to be college graduates, older, educated on cervical cancer, or married. On the other hand, individuals with more socioeconomic barriers are associated with lower screening uptake. A 2024 review shows that HPV and cervical cancer screening content are being disseminated on social media platforms such as Facebook and Twitter. Health communication content is being used to encourage the uptake of cervical and HPV screening, making education accessible through these platforms, which may be helpful in reaching the World Health Organization’s goal of eliminating cervical cancer through HPV screening.

Different countries and medical organizations have specific cervical screening recommendations to guide patient care.

=== World Health Organization ===
In 2021, the World Health Organization published the second edition of WHO guideline for screening and treatment of cervical pre-cancer lesions for cervical cancer prevention. Within this publication, they outline 23 recommendations addressing differences in guidelines for women living with or without HIV. The quality of evidence is rated strong, moderate, low, or very low. Some of the recommendations are included below; this is not a comprehensive list.

- HPV molecular testing is recommended as primary screening, with or without triage, in all women. HPV screening should occur every 5 to 10 years.
- When used, VIA or cytologic screening should occur every 3 years.
- Begin screening at the age of 30
- Stop screening at the age of 50, as long as the most recent two tests were negative

=== Europe ===
Example of the percentage of preventive screening in the Czech Republic between 2010 and 2023

Most countries suggest or offer screening between the ages of 25 and 64. According to the 2015 European guidelines for cervical cancer screening, routine HPV primary screening should not begin under 30 years of age. Primary testing for oncogenic HPV can be used in a population-based program for cervical cancer screening. In England, the NHS cervical screening program is available to women aged 25 to 64; women aged 25 to 49 receive an invitation every 3 years and women aged 50 to 64 receive an invitation every 5 years to undergo HPV testing. If there is a positive HPV test result, then patients undergo further cytology (Pap smear).

=== United States ===
In the US, doctors follow the guidelines of both the American College of obstetrics and Gynecology (ACOG) or the United States Preventative Services Task Force (USPSTF) for cervical cancer screening, which are primarily stratified by age. Screening is recommended for women between ages 21 and 65 every 3 years using cervical cytology, regardless of age at sexual initiation or other high-risk behaviors.

The age-based recommendations by both institutions are as follows:

- No screening recommended for women less than 21.
- From ages 21 to 29, a pap smear is recommended every three years with cervical cytology alone.
- From ages 30 to 65, women can choose between a pap smear every three year or an FDA-approved primary high risk HPV test every five years, or pap smear and HPV co-testing every five years.
- In women over the age of 65, screening for cervical cancer may be discontinued in the absence of abnormal screening results within the prior 10 years and no history of high-grade lesions.
- For women with other comorbidities these guidelines may differ.

In addition to the age-based guidelines provided by the USPSTF and ACOG, are risk-based guidelines established by a consensus of medical professionals (i.e., the American Academy of Family Physicians, the American Cancer Society, ACOG, etc.), government organizations (i.e., the National Cancer Institute), and patient advocacy groups. These risk-based guidelines take into account an individual's current and prior cervical screening results in order to estimate an individual's immediate and 5-year risk of developing CIN 3 or higher. The risk estimates are then used by practitioners to help determine screening and surveillance intervals, as well as management of results (i.e., further evaluation with colposcopy or treatment). Based on an individuals risk estimates, the practitioner may recommend the individual continue with age-based screening recommendations or return for surveillance at shorter intervals (i.e., 1 year or 4 months). Alternatively, an individual's risk estimate may warrant the recommendation of colposcopy with biopsy for further evaluation or expedited treatment.

=== United Kingdom ===
In the UK, guidelines administered by the National Health Service of England (NHS England) recommend and offer cervical screening to women aged 25–64. Invitations to receive cervical screening are administered via mail to all individuals registered within a General Practice, with initial invitations sent to those aged 24–25. Invitations are sent every 3 years. Cervical screenings primarily look for the presence of human papillomavirus (HPV), specifically looking at the presence of abnormal cells within the cervix. If abnormal cells are reported, patients will receive a colposcopy, and further testing and treatment will be administered if necessary. If the test yields no abnormal results, routine screening will be offered every 3–5 years, depending on age and sexual activity.

=== Latin America ===
In the greater Americas, specifically Latin America, cervical screening guidelines are administered by the Pan American Health Organization (PAHO) and the World Health Organization (WHO). As a result, screening guidelines are similar to those of the US. However, the guidelines vary by country. Current guidelines in Mexico suggest screening to be administered to those aged 25–64, however, it can begin earlier if individuals have engaged in sexual activity before the age of 25. The testing routine calls for screenings at least every 5–10 years following the initial screening.

=== Australia ===
Screening is offered to women aged 18–70, every two years. This is by Pap smear, and regardless of sexual history. In Canada, where screening programs are arranged at provincial level, the general recommendation is not to begin routine screening until the age of 25 in the absence of specific reasons to, then to screen every three years until the age of 69. In Ontario, "The Ontario Cervical Screening Program recommends that women who are or have been sexually active have a Pap test every 3 years starting at age 21."

=== Nigeria ===
In Nigeria, cervical cancer is the most common life-threatening disease affecting the female genital tract, with an estimated 10,000 new cases and 8,000 deaths reported within the same period. In sub-Saharan Africa, the HPV 16 strain in present in about 50–70% of cases and the HPV 18 strain in 7–20% of cases.

In Nigeria, the conventional Pap smear intervention is currently being used to screen for cervical cancer. In developing countries like Nigeria, the adoption of cervical cancer screening by women is largely affected by a lack of awareness and knowledge of cervical cancer, a lack of a comprehensive policy for cervical cancer prevention, and inadequate publicity of available strategies. It is essential to address the factors limiting cervical cancer screening in Nigeria through policies and health education

=== Thailand ===
The Ministry of Public Health recommends that women aged 30-60 receive primary HPV testing every 5 years. Based on the results of the test, those with higher risk strains of HPV will be referred for colposcopy, while those with lower risk strains will be referred for cytology.

== Management of screening results ==
Screening results are generally categorized as normal or abnormal. Women who receive an abnormal test result will be guided on their next recommended steps by their healthcare provider. Management is significantly impacted based on the type of testing done and the severity of the abnormality. Some of the follow-up options include surveillance, histological diagnosis via colposcopy/biopsy, or removal of the abnormal tissue via an ablative or surgical method.

The World Health Organization outlines two different approaches to cervical screening and follow-up. They are the Screen and Treat; and the Screen, Triage and Treat. Patient preferences, healthcare access, and system resources are factors that play a role in which approach providers will recommend to their patients.

Laser ablation and cryotherapy treat just the part of the cervix that contains abnormal cells. Laser ablation uses a laser to burn away the abnormal cells, while cryotherapy uses a cold probe to freeze the cells away. These procedures allow normal cells to grow back in their place. The loop electrical excision procedure (called LLETZ or 'large loop excision of the transformation zone' in the UK), cervical conization (or cone biopsy) and hysterectomy remove the whole area containing the abnormal cells.

== Psychological implications of cervical screening ==
Individuals who undergo cervical screening have a variety of psychological responses and preconceptions that motivate their decision to participate in screening. Many women are hesitant to undergo cervical screenings, fearing that they may feel shame, discomfort, or dishonor with themselves if the results come back unfavorably. There may be positive psychological responses from participating in screening, such as for those who are relieved of screening-specific anxiety, feel a greater sense of control, or more clarity on the state of their health. Some reasons for this may stem from relief that the screening is over, even if the results are abnormal. Screenings have not always been as widely available as they are currently in healthcare, yet they are still not utilized to their fullest potential. Fear of abnormal results, time inconveniences, medical mistrust, lack of knowledge about the test’s benefits, not considering oneself to be at risk, or fatalism are some reasons why some women may not comply with screening guidelines. Some stigma exists around cervical screening, as it is a very vulnerable and sometimes uncomfortable procedure, but it is important to deconstruct this stigma in order to promote routine participation. Education on the effectiveness of cervical screening in its preventative characteristics is associated with an increased chance of routine screening participation. Nonjudgmental support from healthcare officials and the implementation of public health campaigns that normalize screening may help reduce stigma surrounding misconceptions about HPV and cervical cancer. This could improve screening uptake, especially in underserved areas of the world. Understanding and addressing the psychological dimensions behind cervical screening are vital factors in making a higher quality screening experience.

== Emerging technologies ==
The Bill and Melinda Gates Foundation has funded an eight-year study of a DNA test for the virus that causes cervical cancer. The test manufactured by Qiagen for a low cost per test, with results available in only a few hours, may allow a reduction in the use of annual Pap smears. The test has been shown to work "acceptably well" on women who take the swabs themselves rather than allowing a physician to test. This may improve the chances of early diagnosis for women who are unwilling to be screened due to discomfort or modesty.

VIA, one of the alternative approaches to conventional testing, has been shown to have a low specificity compared to cytology and a high rate of false positives in several studies. Entities such as inflammation, cervical condyloma, and leukoplakia can give false-positive results of the VIA test. There is no permanent record of the test to be reviewed later. Between community centers, high variability has been observed, and even in a study of Nigeria in 2013, VIA was neither reproducible nor sensitive; this led to discouragement of the method in that country.

In addition, p16/Ki-67 are emerging biomarkers that have been used as a triage method for HPV-positive patients. In studies conducted so far, p16/Ki-67 dual staining has had a higher sensitivity and specificity compared to cytology. Using these biomarkers may help in reducing the number of false-positive tests and unnecessary examinations.

Assessing DNA methylation patterns in individuals with HPV is also an emerging screening method. There are about 80 methylation patterns that can serve as potential biomarkers for cervical cancer. Molecular testing of DNA methylation patterns is more objective than cytology testing and can be automated, requiring less training with more precision.

Vaginal and urine self-sampling have shown promising results in detecting the signs of cervical cancer. They also offer a more environmentally friendly alternative to in-person screening.

== See also ==
- CervicalCheck
- Pap Test
