= SARI Screening Tool =

Saudi Arabian COVID-19 screening tool

SARI Screening Tool also known as the SARI score is a tool developed by the Ministry of Health in the Kingdom of Saudi Arabia. It is a visual triage used to identify those with the potential to have COVID-19. The tools was also used to screen for MERS. It has been modified multiple times and the weights of each symptom have been changed over time as well.
