= Navicular cell =

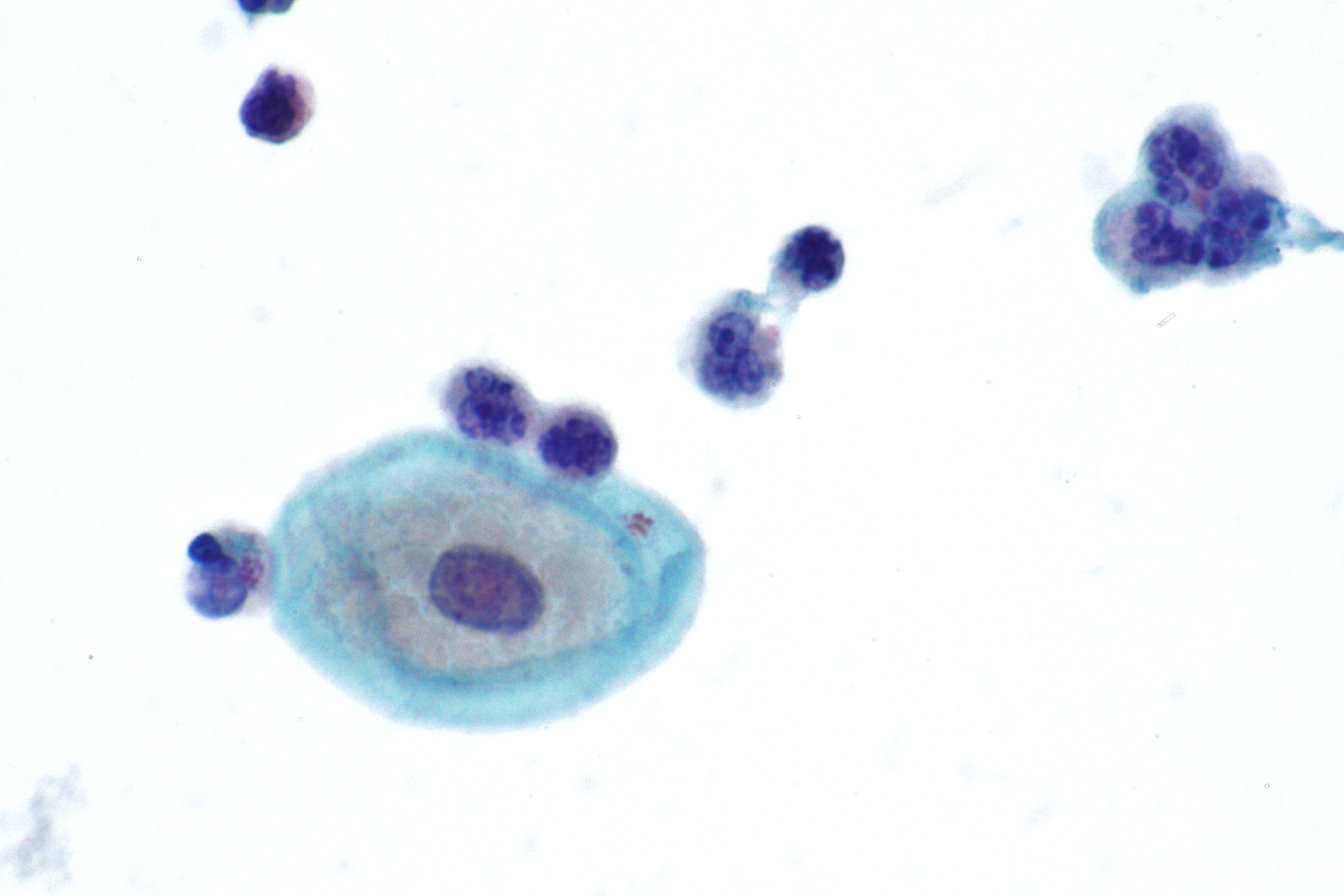
Micrograph showing navicular cell in extremely high magnification

Navicular cell is a boat-shaped benign epithelial cell seen in Pap smear. They are seen in pregnancy (most prominently during smears taken in the second trimester), second half of menstrual cycle, during menopause and in women using medroxyprogesterone acetate (depo-provera) for contraception. Navicular cells have folded edges, with a thickened outer rim of cytoplasm and an eccentric nucleus. They contain abundant glycogen in the cytoplasm, giving it a central yellow halo. The cytoplasm appears golden, refractile and granular under the microscope. In depo-provera users, the high progesterone levels result in more exfoliation of superficial squamous cells, thereby causing navicular cells to appear in Pap smear.

== Gallery ==
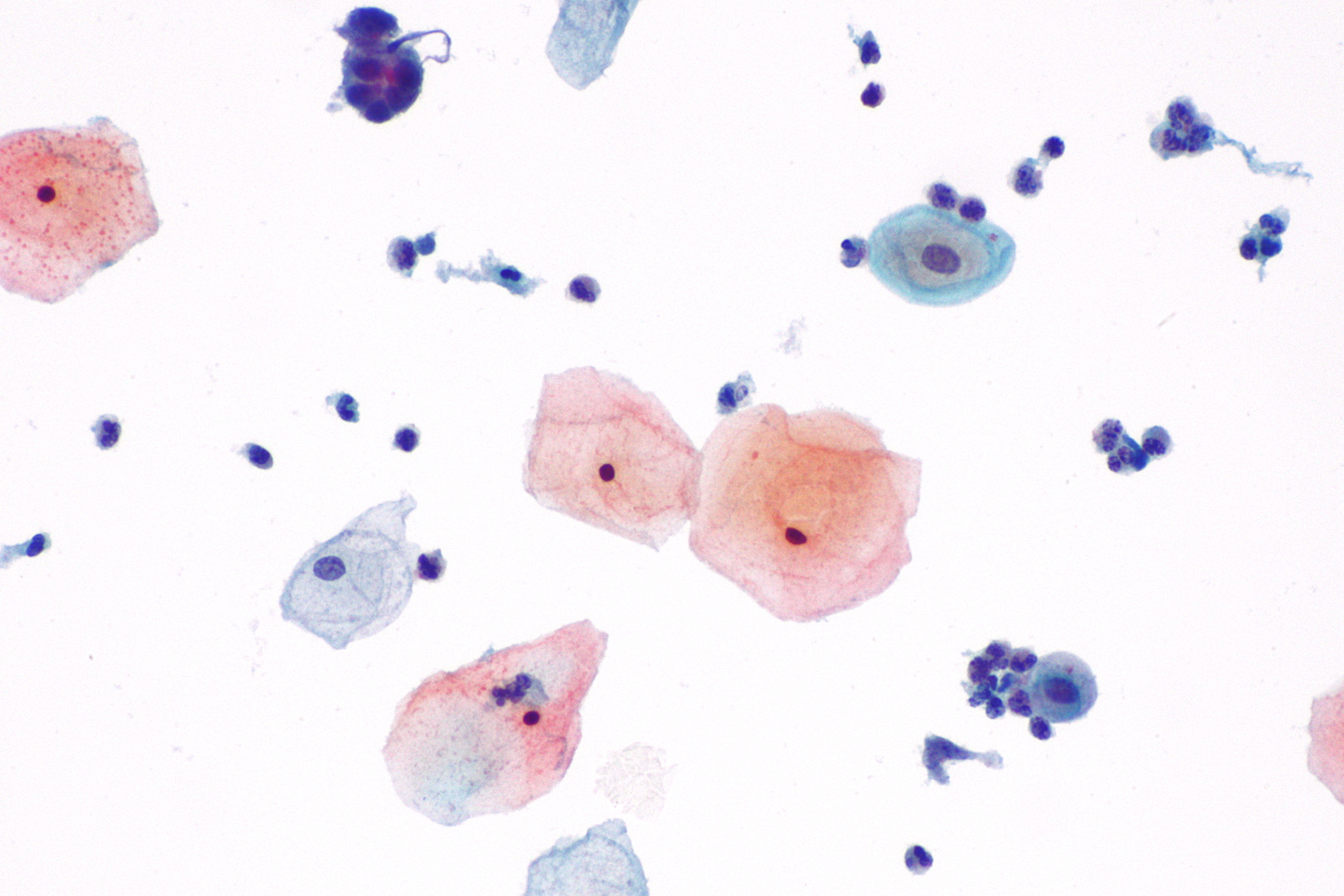
High magnification view

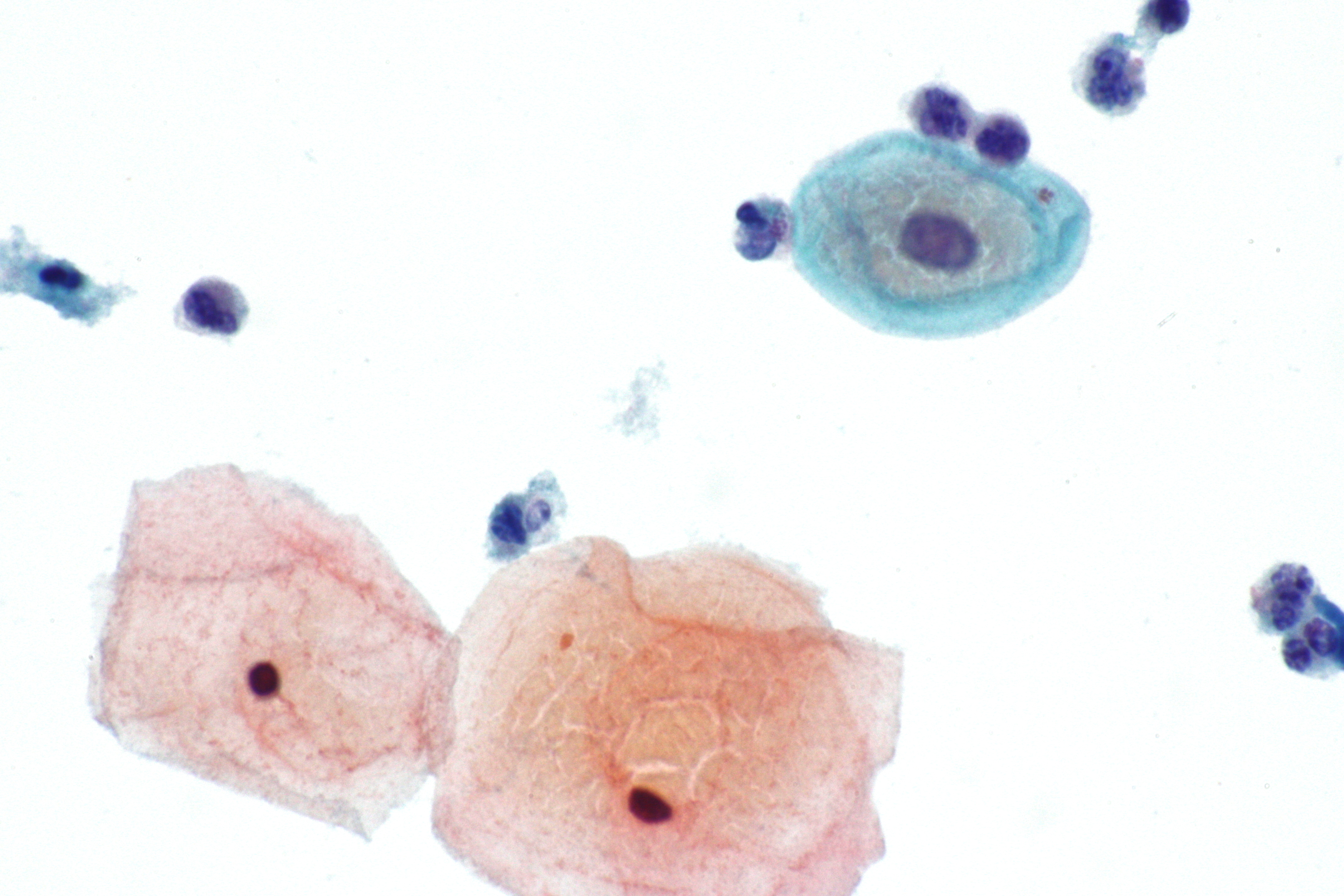
Very high magnification view
