= Skin infection =

Infections of the skin

A skin infection is an infection of the skin in humans and other animals, that can also affect the associated soft tissues such as loose connective tissue and mucous membranes. They comprise a category of infections termed skin and skin structure infections (SSSIs), or skin and soft tissue infections (SSTIs), and acute bacterial SSSIs (ABSSSIs). They are distinguished from dermatitis (inflammation of the skin), although skin infections can result in skin inflammation.

== Causes ==
=== Bacterial ===
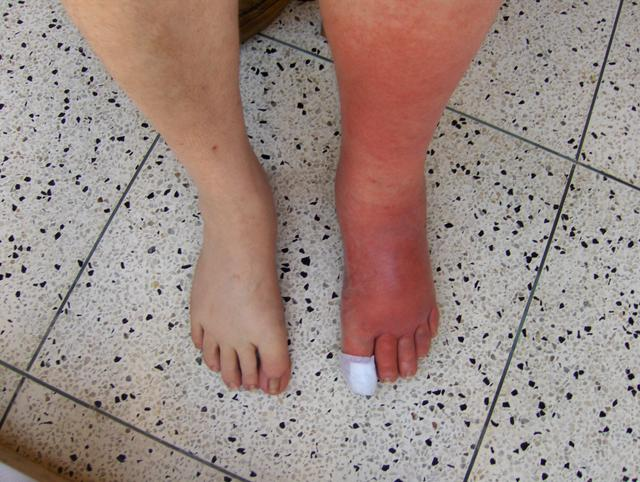
Example of cellulitis showing 3+ edema of left leg

Bacterial skin infections affected about 155 million people and cellulitis occurred in about 600 million people in 2013. Bacterial skin infections include:

- Cellulitis, a diffuse inflammation of connective tissue with severe inflammation of dermal and subcutaneous layers of the skin. Further, cellulitis can be classified based into purulent and non-purulent cellulitis, based on the most likely causative agent and the symptoms presentation. Purulent cellulitis is often caused by Staphylococcus aureus, including both methicillin-sensitive (MSSA) and methicillin-resistant S. aureus (MRSA). Non-purulent cellulitis is most often associated with group A beta-hemolytic streptococci, such as Streptococcus pyogenes. In rare cases, the infection can progress into necrotizing fasciitis, a serious and potentially fatal infection.
- Erysipelas, a bacterial infection which primarily affects superficial dermis, and often involves superficial lymphatics. Unlike cellulitis, it does not affect deeper layers of the skin. It is primarily caused by the Group A beta-hemolytic streptococci, with Streptococcus pyogenes being the most common pathogen.
- Folliculitis, a skin condition in which hair follicle, located in the dermal layer of the skin, becomes infected and inflamed. It is predominantly caused by bacterial infections, especially Staphylococcus aureus, leading to superficial bacterial folliculitis. Other causative agents of folliculitis include fungi (most commonly Malassezia species), viruses (such as herpes simplex virus), and mites (Demodex species).
- Impetigo, a highly contagious ABSSSI (acute bacterial skin and skin structure infection) common among pre-school children, primarily associated with the pathogens S. aureus and S. pyogenes. Impetigo has a characteristic appearance with yellow (honey-coloured), crusted lesions occurring around mouth, nose, and chin. It is estimated that at any given time it affects 140 million people globally. Impetigo can be further classified into bullous and nonbullous forms. Nonbullous impetigo is the most common form, representing approximately 70% of diagnosed cases. The remaining 30% of cases represent bullous form, which is primarily caused by S. aureus. In rare instances, bullous impetigo can spread and lead to Staphylococcal Scalded Skin Syndrome (SSSS), a potentially life-threatening infection.

=== Fungal ===
Fungal skin infections, sometimes referred to as dermatomycoses, may present as either a superficial or deep infection of the skin, hair, and/or nails. Mycetoma are a broad group of fungal infections that characteristically originate in the skin and subcutaneous tissues of the foot. If not treated appropriately and in a timely fashion mycetoma infections can extend to deeper tissues like bones and joints causing osteomyelitis. Extensive osteomyelitis can necessitate surgical bone resections and even lower limb amputation. As of 2010, they affect about one billion people globally. Some examples of common fungal skin infections include:

- Dermatophytosis, also known as ringworm, is a superficial fungal infection of the skin caused by several different species of fungi. The fungal genera which cause skin infections in humans include Trichophyton, Epidermophyton, and Microsporum. Although dermatophytosis is fairly common fungal skin infection worldwide, it is more prevalent in areas with high humidity and environmental temperature. It is estimated that approximately 20-25% of world population are affected by superficial fungal infections, with dermatophytosis predominating.
- Oral candidiasis, also commonly referred to as oral thrush, is a fungal infection caused mainly by Candida albicans, which affects mucosal membranes of the oral cavity and the tongue. C. albicans accounts for approximately 95% of oral thrush cases. The fungus is part of the normal oral flora and only causes an infection when host immune and microbiota barriers are impaired, providing C. albicans with an opportunity to overgrow. It is estimated that oral candidiasis affects approximately 2 million people every year worldwide.
- Onychomycosis, a fungal infection which predominantly affects toenails. Two most common causative agents of onychomycosis are Trichophyton mentagrophytes and Trichophyton rubrum. Common signs and symptoms include nail discolouration and thickening, nail separation from nail bed, and nail brittleness. Estimated prevalence of onychomycosis in North America is between 8.7% to 13.8%.

=== Parasitic ===
Parasitic infestations of the skin are caused by several phyla of organisms, including Annelida, Arthropoda, Bryozoa, Chordata, Cnidaria, Cyanobacteria, Echinodermata, Nemathelminthes, Platyhelminthes, and Protozoa.

=== Viral ===
Virus-related cutaneous conditions caused by these obligate intracellular agents derive from both DNA and RNA viruses. Some examples of viral skin infections include:

- Warts, benign proliferative skin lesions that are caused by human papilloma virus (HPV). Warts vary in shape, size, appearance, and location on the body where they occur. For example, plantar warts (verrucae plantaris), occur on the soles of the feet and appear as thick calluses. Other types of warts include genital warts, flat warts, mosaic warts, and periungual warts. Common treatment options include salicylic acid and cryotherapy with liquid nitrogen.
- Chickenpox is a highly contagious skin disease caused by the varicella-zoster virus (VZV). It is characterized by pruritic blister-like rash which may cover entire body, affecting all age groups. Rates of chickenpox are higher in countries which lack adequate immunization programs. In 2014, it has been estimated that global incidence of serious chickenpox infections requiring hospitalizations was 4.2 million.
- Hand, foot, and mouth disease (HFMD), is a common, often self-limiting viral illness which typically affects infants and children, however, it may also occur in adults. It is characterized by low grade fever and maculopapular rash on palms of the hands, soles of the feet, and around mouth. It is caused by the human enteroviruses and coxsackieviruses, a positive-sense single-stranded RNA viruses.
