= Butcher's wart =

- Specialty: Dermatology
- Symptoms: Multiple wart on hands
- Causes: HPV2, 4 and 7
- Risk factors: Butchers
- Prognosis: Frequently recur
- Frequency: Common

Butcher's wart is a wart on the hands of butchers. They tend to occur in multiple numbers. These warts are generally larger than common warts.

It is typically associated with HPV2, 4 and 7; up to 50% by HPV7. It occurs when hands have had prolonged contact with moist meat. Following treatment, they typically recur.

The condition is common.

== Signs and symptoms ==
Butcher's wart presents as a wart on the hands of people who handle meat for prolonged periods. These warts are generally larger than common warts.

== Cause ==
It is typically associated with HPV2, 4 and 7; mostly HPV2 and up to 50% by HPV7. It occurs when hands have had prolonged contact with moist meat. Following treatment, they typically recur.

== History ==
In 1977, the condition had a prevalence of 8.5% to 23.8% among butchers and other meat-handling professions.

== See also ==
- List of cutaneous conditions
