= Late protein =

L1 (late) protein
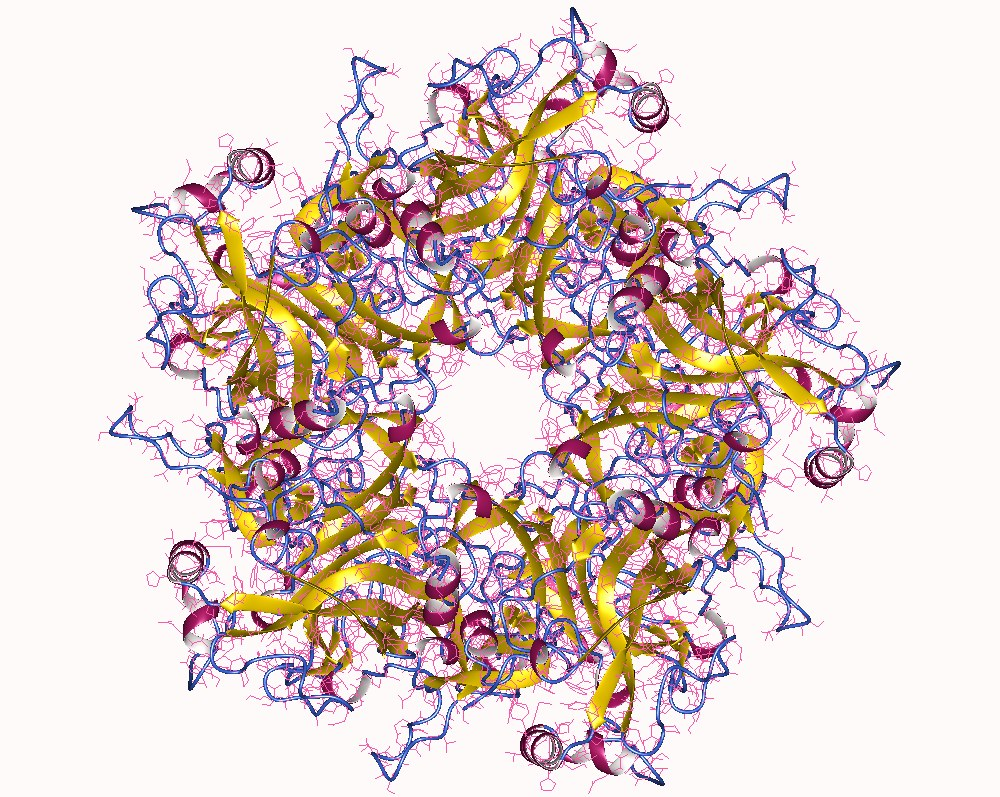
- Major capsid protein L1 pentamer, Human papillomavirus 11

Identifiers
- Symbol: Late_protein_L1
- Pfam: PF00500
- InterPro: IPR002210
- SCOP2: 1dzl / SCOPe / SUPFAM
Available protein structures:
- PDB: IPR002210 PF00500 (ECOD; PDBsum)
- AlphaFold: IPR002210; PF00500

Late Protein L2

Identifiers
- Symbol: Late_protein_L2
- Pfam: PF00513
- InterPro: IPR000784
Available protein structures:
- PDB: IPR000784 PF00513 (ECOD; PDBsum)
- AlphaFold: IPR000784; PF00513

A late protein is a viral protein that is formed after replication of the virus. One example is VP4 from simian virus 40 (SV40).

== In Human papillomaviruses ==
In Human papillomavirus (HPV), two late proteins are involved in capsid formation: a major (L1) and a minor (L2) protein, in the approximate proportion 95:5%. L1 forms a pentameric assembly unit of the viral shell in a manner that closely resembles VP1 from polyomaviruses. Intermolecular disulphide bonding holds the L1 capsid proteins together. L1 capsid proteins can bind via its nuclear localisation signal (NLS) to karyopherins Kapbeta(2) and Kapbeta(3) and inhibit the Kapbeta(2) and Kapbeta(3) nuclear import pathways during the productive phase of the viral life cycle. Surface loops on L1 pentamers contain sites of sequence variation between HPV types. L2 minor capsid proteins enter the nucleus twice during infection: in the initial phase after virion disassembly, and in the productive phase when it assembles into replicated virions along with L1 major capsid proteins. L2 proteins contain two nuclear localisation signals (NLSs), one at the N-terminal (nNLS) and the other at the C-terminal (cNLS). L2 uses its NLSs to interact with a network of karyopherins in order to enter the nucleus via several import pathways. L2 from HPV types 11 and 16 was shown to interact with karyopherins Kapbeta(2) and Kapbeta(3). L2 capsid proteins can also interact with viral dsDNA, facilitating its release from the endocytic compartment after viral uncoating.

== See also ==
- Early protein
