= Digitate wart =

Type of wart

Digitate or filiform warts are warts that often appear on the eyelids, lips, face, or neck.

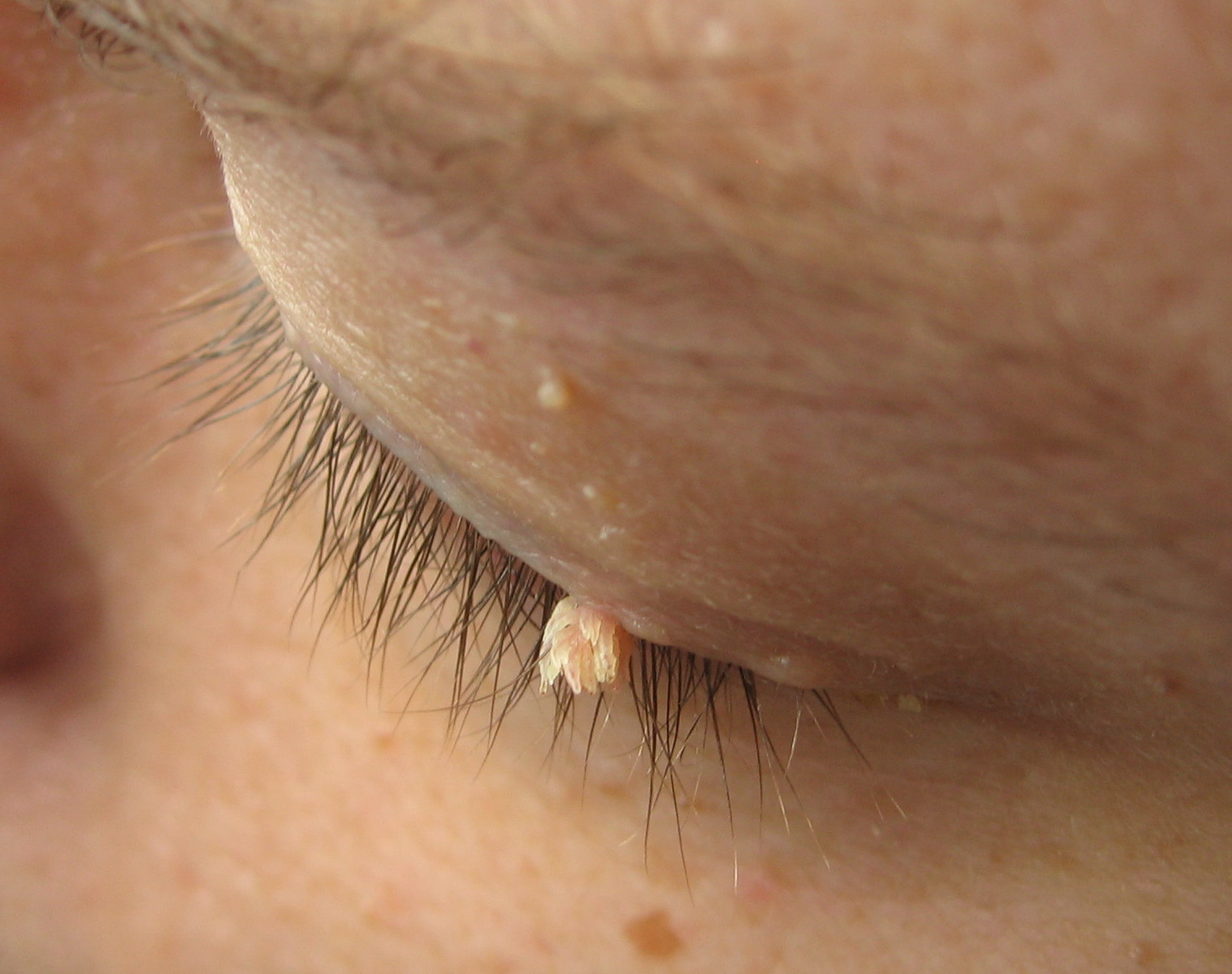
A filiform wart on the eyelid.

The warts tend to grow directly outwards from the skin. They have a spiky, thread-like, or finger-like appearance. They sometimes look and feel like tiny brushes, making them especially uncomfortable for the patient.

As with other wart types, several treatments are available, including laser therapy, cryotherapy, salicylic acid, and other topical treatments.

== See also ==
- Skin tag
