= Chi Van Dang =

Hematological oncologist

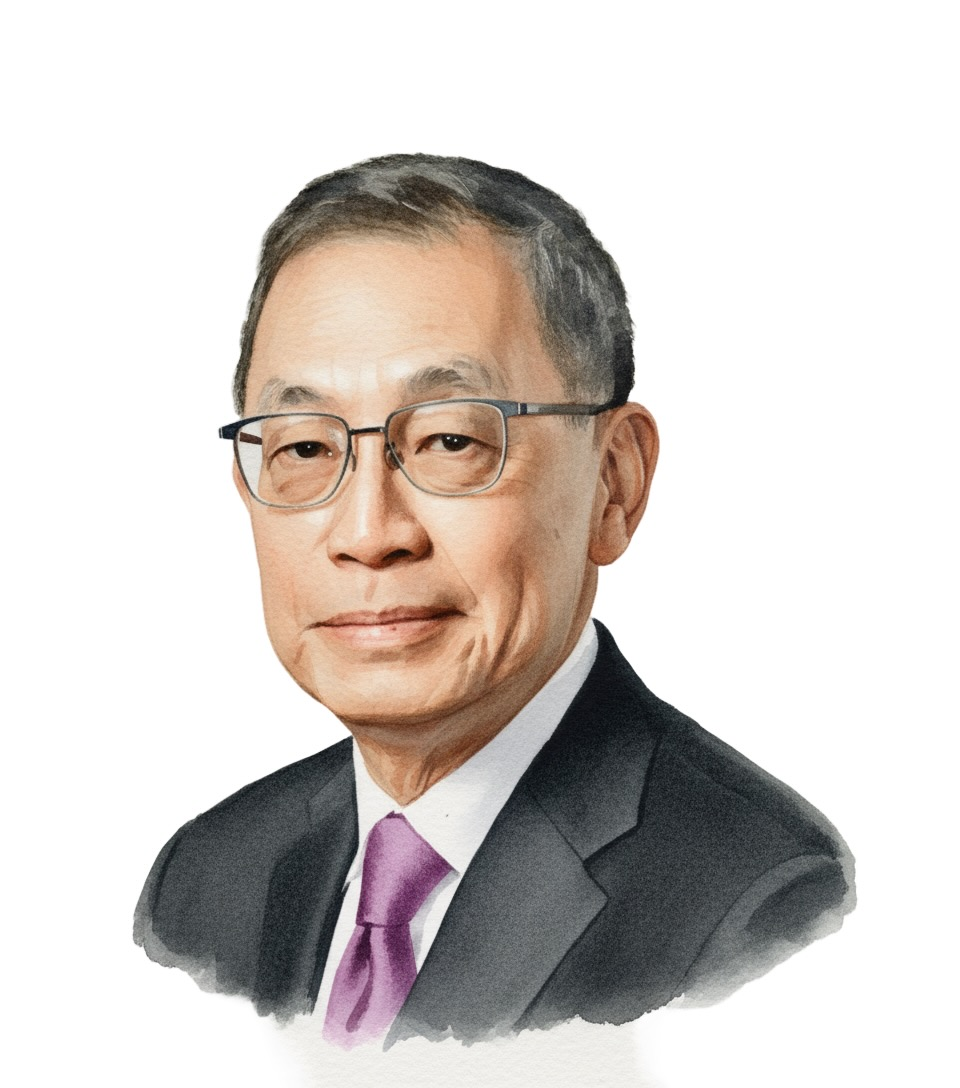
- Born: Saigon, Vietnam
- Education: University of Michigan; Georgetown University; Johns Hopkins University
- Known for: Work on the Myc Oncogene; Circadian clock in Cancer
- Honors: Member of the National Academy of Medicine; Fellow of the American Academy of Arts and Sciences
- Scientific career
- Fields: Oncology; Molecular Biology
- Workplaces: Ludwig Institute for Cancer Research; Johns Hopkins University; University of Pennsylvania; University of California, San Francisco;
- Website: University Profile

Chi Van Dang is a hematological oncologist and researcher, and the CEO and scientific director of Ludwig Institute for Cancer Research. He is known for his research on genetics, the MYC gene and the cellular energy metabolism of cancer.

Dang has been president of the American Society for Clinical Investigation. He has been elected to the National Academy of Medicine, the American Association for Cancer Research Academy, the American Academy of Arts and Sciences, the American Society for Clinical Investigation, and the Association of American Physicians,. He is member of the VinFuture Prize Council

== Early life and academics ==
Chi Van Dang was born in Saigon, Vietnam as one of ten children. Dang's father was Chieu Van Dang, Vietnam's first neurosurgeon and was once the dean of the University of Saigon School of Medicine.

After arriving in the United States in 1967, Dang completed his B.S. degree in Chemistry at the University of Michigan in 1975, his Ph.D in chemistry at Georgetown University in 1978, and M.D. from Johns Hopkins University, in 1982. At the University of California, San Francisco, he completed a fellowship on Hematology-Oncology training where he began to work with the MYC gene.

== Career ==
In 1987, Dang returned to Johns Hopkins where he took a faculty position. He was Director of the Division of Hematology at Johns Hopkins Hospital from 1993-2003. He also was Johns Hopkins Family Professor in Oncology Research. As of 2002, he became Vice Dean for Research, and Director of the Johns Hopkins Institute for Cell Engineering.

From 2002 to 2003, Dang was the President of the American Society for Clinical Investigation. In his 2003 presidential address, he remarked, "I wish to remind all of us of the power of healing. Be it in the laboratory, at the cageside, bedside or computerside, we, as physicians, all have the ability to heal."

As of September 1, 2011, Dang became the John H. Glick Professor of Medicine and the Director of the Abramson Cancer Center at the University of Pennsylvania.

As of July 1, 2017, Dang became the Scientific Director of the Ludwig Institute for Cancer Research, with the responsibility of overseeing the Institute's scientific strategy for studying the prevention, diagnosis, and treatment of cancer. The Ludwig Institute has branches in the United States, Switzerland, and the United Kingdom. He was also appointed a professor at the Wistar Institute on the campus of the University of Pennsylvania, which hosts the Ludwig Laboratory during his tenure as The Ludwig Institute's Scientific Director.

In 2018, Dang became Editor-in-Chief of Cancer Research, a peer-reviewed scientific journal published by the American Association for Cancer Research. He published his first editorial in January.

== Research ==
Dang's research has focused on cancer cells and genetics, notably on energy utilization of cancer cells. Research Dang's laboratories has contributed to the understanding of the function of the MYC a gene associated with different cancers. Dang has examined the mechanisms and molecular signaling pathways governing the metabolism of cancer. By first establishing the mechanistic link between MYC and cellular energy metabolism, he identified the MYC gene as a master regulator of cell proliferation and cellular metabolism. This research has contributed to the idea that genetic alterations re-program the energy utilization of tumors and specialize cancer cells to rely on specific fuel sources. This work may help to explain the Warburg effect. Disrupting communication signalling pathways in cancer cells is a possible strategy for the development of drugs to battle cancer.

Eric Fearon conducted his postdoctoral research in Dang's laboratory, where he developed a system for the study of protein-protein interactions in living mammalian cells.

Dang is also a proponent of chronotherapy, the idea that the delivery of drugs can be timed to take advantage of the body’s natural 24-hour rhythms, to minimize side effects and maximize treatment effectiveness. The National Cancer Institute has begun to support research into the function and regulation of clock genes and interactions between circadian rhythms, diseases, and treatments.

== Awards ==
- 2018, Fellow, American Association for Cancer Research (AACR)
- 2012, Distinguished Alumnus Award for Scientific Achievement, Johns Hopkins University
- 2011, Fellow, American Academy of Arts and Sciences
- 2006, Member, National Academy of Medicine
- 2005, Golden Torch Award, Vietnamese-American National Gala
- 2003, Mark Brothers Award, Indiana University School of Medicine
- 1997, Member, Association of American Physicians
- 1996, Member, American Association for Cancer Research (AACR)
- 1993, Member, American Society for Clinical Investigation
