= Ludwig-McGill HPV Cohort =

Established in 1993 by Ludwig Cancer Research and McGill University (Montreal, Canada), the Ludwig / McGill Cohort is one of the world's largest longitudinal studies of the natural history of human papillomavirus (HPV) infection and cervical cancer risk.

- The Ludwig / McGill Cohort provided pap cytology and HPV testing for 2,528 low income women in São Paulo, Brazil, a city with one of the highest risks for cervical cancer worldwide. Some of these women have been monitored clinically for more than 10 years.
- This international collaboration contributed data critical for the design and development of vaccines against HPV.
- LICR São Paulo Branch Director, and co-founder of the Ludwig / McGill Cohort, Dr. Luisa L. Villa, was the lead author of the first study to show efficacy of Merck's HPV vaccine, Gardasil.
- Important findings from the Ludwig / McGill cohort include:
  1. Diet may decrease the risk of cervical disease. This finding is particularly relevant to the developing world where changes in diet are more feasible and less costly than treating the infection or resultant disease, and
  2. Different types of HPV are present in different ethnic populations. This critical finding may affect vaccine formulation and efficacy in different parts of the world.
