= Ludwig Cancer Research =

Cancer-research organization

- Founded: 1971
- Founder: Daniel K. Ludwig
- Headquarters: New York, NY, USA; Zürich, Switzerland
- Region served: International
- Fields: Cancer research
- Key people: Chi Van Dang, MD, PhD (LICR CEO and Scientific Director); Jonathan Skipper, PhD (LICR President)
- Website: www.ludwigcancerresearch.org

Ludwig Cancer Research is an international network of research institutes and laboratories that conduct basic, translational, and clinical studies on cancer. The name refers collectively to two distinct components: the Ludwig Institute for Cancer Research (LICR), an international non-profit organization founded in 1971 by American businessman and philanthropist Daniel K. Ludwig, and the six endowed and independent Ludwig Centers established in 2006 at prominent U.S. biomedical research institutions.

Ludwig Cancer Research supports fundamental and translational cancer research in cancer immunology, genomics, cancer metabolism, metastasis, epigenetics and the tumor microenvironment, with the goal of developing novel diagnostics and therapies. Its global structure seeks to foster collaboration to advance the understanding of cancer biology and the application of that knowledge to its prevention, diagnosis, and treatment.

== History ==
Daniel K. Ludwig, a shipping and real estate magnate, founded LICR in 1971 with an initial endowment of foreign assets from his business holdings.

Between 1971 and 1974, Ludwig transferred his international assets to the Institute, a gift then valued at more than US$560 million (equivalent to about US$3.6 billion in 2025). This created what was for decades the world’s largest philanthropic entity dedicated to cancer research. LICR operated a global conglomerate, including a major oil shipping business, whose profits funded its worldwide Branches until 1992, when it sold its assets and invested the proceeds in financial markets.

Following Ludwig’s death in 1992, his remaining assets established the Virginia and D.K. Ludwig Fund for Cancer Research. The Fund initially supported endowed professorships and chairs of clinical investigation with assets of US$69 million. In 2006, the Fund donated US$120 million in cash and approximately US$196 million worth of stocks to establish six Ludwig Centers at leading U.S. academic institutions. In 2014, the Fund distributed an additional US$540 million to the Centers and was subsequently dissolved.

== Notable achievements ==
Ludwig Cancer Research and its scientists have contributed to cancer biology and treatment. Highlights include:

- Foundational work on tumor-specific antigens, supporting the development of cancer vaccines and immunotherapies.
- The Ludwig-McGill HPV cohort is one of the world's largest longitudinal studies of human papillomavirus (HPV) infection and cervical cancer risk, and contributed to the development of the HPV vaccine, Gardasil.
- Cloning of granulocyte-monocyte colony-stimulating factor (GM-CSF), used in cancer therapy and experimental immunotherapies.
- Contributions to checkpoint inhibitor therapy, and the development of immune response criteria for clinical trials.
- Discovery of the first cancer T-Cell antigens identified in humans, MAGE-A1, and other antigens of this family, including MAGEA4, the antigen targeted by TECELRA (afamitresgene autoleucel), the first engineered cell therapy for a solid tumor (synovial sarcoma) to receive FDA approval in the U.S.
- Mapping of the glioblastoma multiforme genome, which led to the discovery that some gliomas are driven by mutations in the IDH1 gene. This insight enabled the development of vorasidenib, an FDA-approved therapy for IDH-mutant astrocytoma and oligodendroglioma.

== Branches and centers ==
=== Branches ===
Since its founding, the Ludwig Institute has supported laboratory groups located at major universities and hospitals worldwide. These Branches serve as hubs of research and collaboration. As of 2025, the following Branches are active:

- Lausanne Branch – University of Lausanne (UNIL) and Lausanne University Hospital (CHUV), Switzerland (focus: Cancer immunology)
- Princeton Branch – Princeton University and RWJBarnabas Health – Rutgers Cancer Institute, New Jersey, USA (focus: cancer metabolism)
- Oxford Branch – University of Oxford, United Kingdom (focus: cancer plasticity and epigenetics)

Previously, the Institute also operated branches in London, Zurich, Sydney, Brussels, Bern, Melbourne, Cambridge, Toronto, Montreal, Stockholm, Uppsala, New York, São Paulo, and San Diego.

=== Laboratories ===
LICR also supports two laboratories in Brussels (affiliated with the Oxford Branch), a Ludwig Collaborative Laboratory at Weill Cornell Medicine, and the Scientific Director’s laboratory at Johns Hopkins University. The establishment of the new Ludwig Laboratory for Cell Therapy at Weill Cornell Medicine was announced in February 2026.

=== Centers ===
In 2006, the Virginia and D.K. Ludwig Fund for Cancer Research endowed six Ludwig Centers:

- Harvard Medical School
- Johns Hopkins University
- Massachusetts Institute of Technology
- Memorial Sloan Kettering Cancer Center
- Stanford University
- University of Chicago

== Leadership ==
Chi Van Dang has been CEO of LICR since July 2024 and has also been the Institute's Scientific Director since 2017. The president of LICR is Jonathan Skipper, and the chairman of the board is Edward McDermott Jr., former president and CEO of LICR.

== See also ==
- Cancer research
- Immunotherapy
- Cancer immunology
