= Early protein =

Classification of viral protein

The classification of viral proteins as early proteins or late proteins depends on their relationship with genome replication. While many viruses (such as HIV) are described as expressing early and late proteins, this definition of these terms is commonly reserved for class I DNA viruses. (HIV has two stages of protein expression but these are not as a result of two stages of transcription surrounding replication but by the production of the Rev protein which is required for the export of the transcripts of the second set of proteins transcribed form the cell nucleus.)

Early proteins are those produced following entry into the host cell but prior to replication. The expression of early genes, commonly encoding non-structural proteins, initiates replication of the genome and expression of late genes.

In some, simpler viruses, this pattern of expression is clearly defined, while in those with more complex genomes, such as the herpesviruses, these expression periods overlap.

== Examples ==
An example of early gene expression is the expression of the small, middle and large T antigen encoded by the polyomavirus. The middle T antigen is not required for replication and it acts to enhance transcription by binding host proteins which interact with the late promoter. On the other hand, the large T antigen is required and it acts to initiate replication directly. It binds the viral origin of replication and recruits DNA polymerase and s/s DNA-binding protein such that once its concentration is great enough it blocks the transcription of early genes and initiates genome replication. It also acts to cause the entry of the host cell into S phase.

=== Bacteriophage T4 ===
Bacteriophage T4 is a virus that infects the bacterium E. coli. Bacteriophage T4 genes are conventionally classified as early function genes or late function genes based on the time period in which their protein products are expressed during the course of bacteriophage infection. In general, the early proteins produced by early function genes act catalytically to promote bacteriophage genome specific DNA replication and repair as well as to facilitate modification of the host nucleotide pool to accommodate these functions. The late function genes code for late proteins that are involved in morphogenesis of the bacteriophage virion, particularly non-enzymatic proteins that comprise the structural components of the virus itself, but also some catalytic proteins that facilitate this morphogenetic assembly process.
