= Periungual wart =

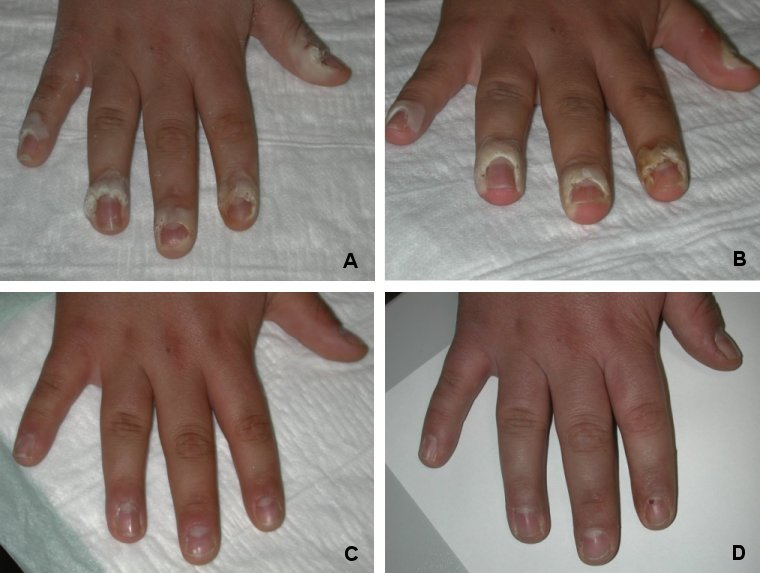
- Periungual warts over 18 weeks of treatment
- Specialty: Dermatology

Periungual warts are warts that cluster around the fingernail or toenail. They appear as thickened, fissured, cauliflower-like skin around the nail plate. Periungual warts often cause loss of the cuticle and paronychia. Nail biting increases susceptibility to these warts.

Warts of this kind often cause damage to the nail either by lifting the nail from the skin or causing the nail to detach partially. If they extend under the nail, then the patient may suffer pain as a result. Sometimes periungual wart infections resemble the changes that are found in onychomycosis. In worst cases, if the infection causes injury or damage to the nail matrix, deformity in the nail may become permanent.

As with other wart types, several treatments are available, including laser therapy, cryotherapy, salicylic acid, and other topical treatments.

== Signs and symptoms ==
Periungual warts are warts that develop next to the hand and foot nails. Usually, warts appear as tiny, scratchy papules that resemble cauliflowers. Black puncta, which are microscopic blood vessel-representing dots, frequently form at the core of hyperkeratotic, dome-shaped lesions. If the growth is cut down, this could potentially result in pinpoint bleeding.

== Diagnosis ==
Usually, a clinical examination is enough to make a diagnosis. Immunocompromised patients or those with resistant, protracted warts should get a biopsy to rule out high-risk HPV strains, Bowen's disease, and squamous cell carcinoma.

== Treatment ==
Treatment options for warts encompass topical, intralesional, and laser therapy. Surgical methods include excision and electrodesiccation, which use electrical current to destroy tissue. They are not recommended as first lines of treatment because of the possibility of scarring and recurrence.
