= Heck's disease =

- Other names: Focal epithelial hyperplasia, multifocal epithelial hyperplasia
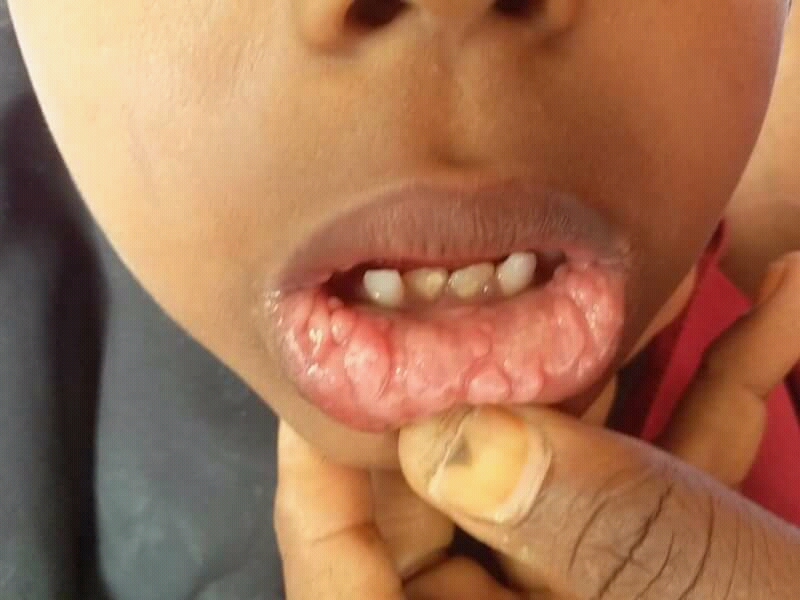
- Specialty: Oral and maxillofacial surgery

Heck's disease, also known as focal (or multifocal) epithelial hyperplasia, is an asymptomatic, benign neoplastic condition characterized by multiple white to pinkish papules that occur diffusely in the mouth. It can present with slightly pale, smooth or roughened surface morphology. It is caused by the human papilloma virus types 13 and 32. It exhibits surface cells with vacuolated cytoplasm around irregular, pyknotic nuclei and occasional cells with mitosis-like changes within otherwise mature and well-differentiated epithelium. A distinguishing histologic feature is elongated rete ridges with mitosoid bodies. It shows "cobblestone" appearance clinically. It was first identified among young Native American patients in the 1960s.

Over time, the papules will spontaneously regress without treatment. Possible treatment may be excisional biopsy for lesions of functional or aesthetic concern.
