= Flat wart =

- Other names: Verruca plana
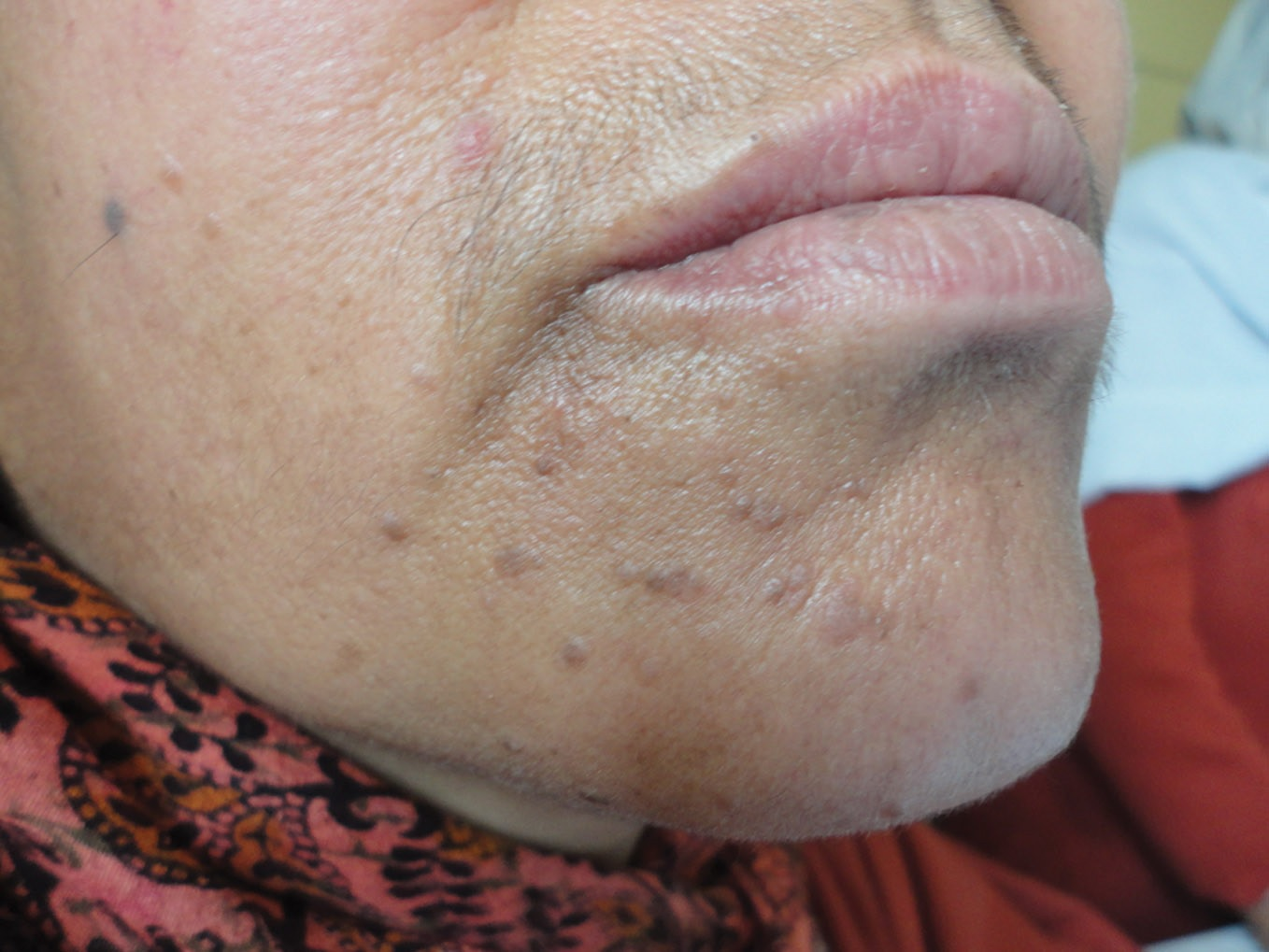
- Verruca plana (flat warts) on the chin of a middle-aged woman
- Specialty: Dermatology

Flat warts, technically known as verruca plana, are reddish-brown or flesh-colored, slightly raised, flat-surfaced, well-demarcated papules of 2 to 5 mm in diameter. Upon close inspection, these lesions have a surface that is "finely verrucous". Most often, these lesions affect the hands, legs, or face, and a linear arrangement is not uncommon. At histopathology, flat warts have cells with prominent perinuclear vacuolization around pyknotic, basophilic, centrally located nuclei that may be located in the granular layer. These are referred to as "owl's eye cells."

== Additional images ==
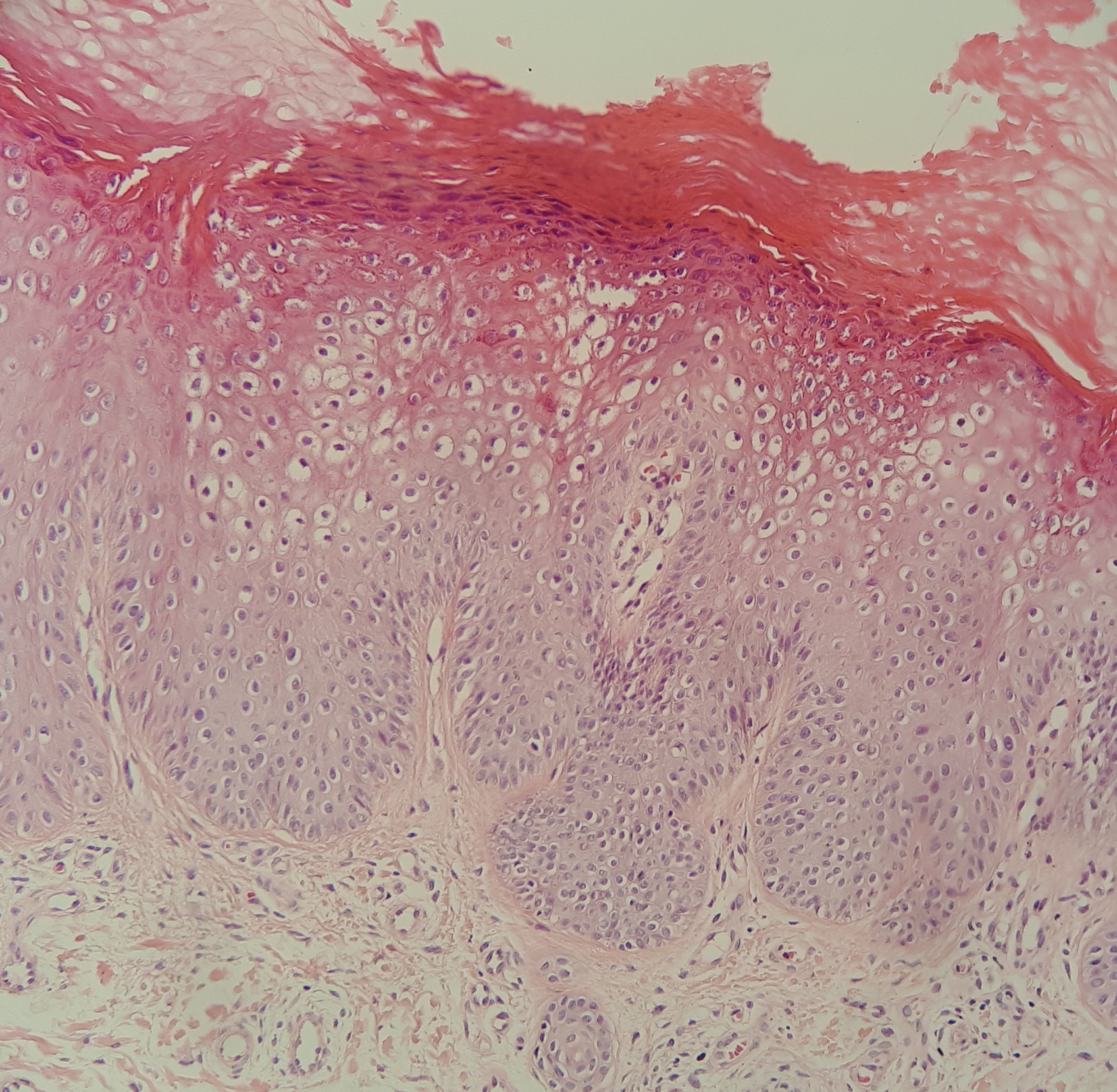
Micrograph of a flat wart

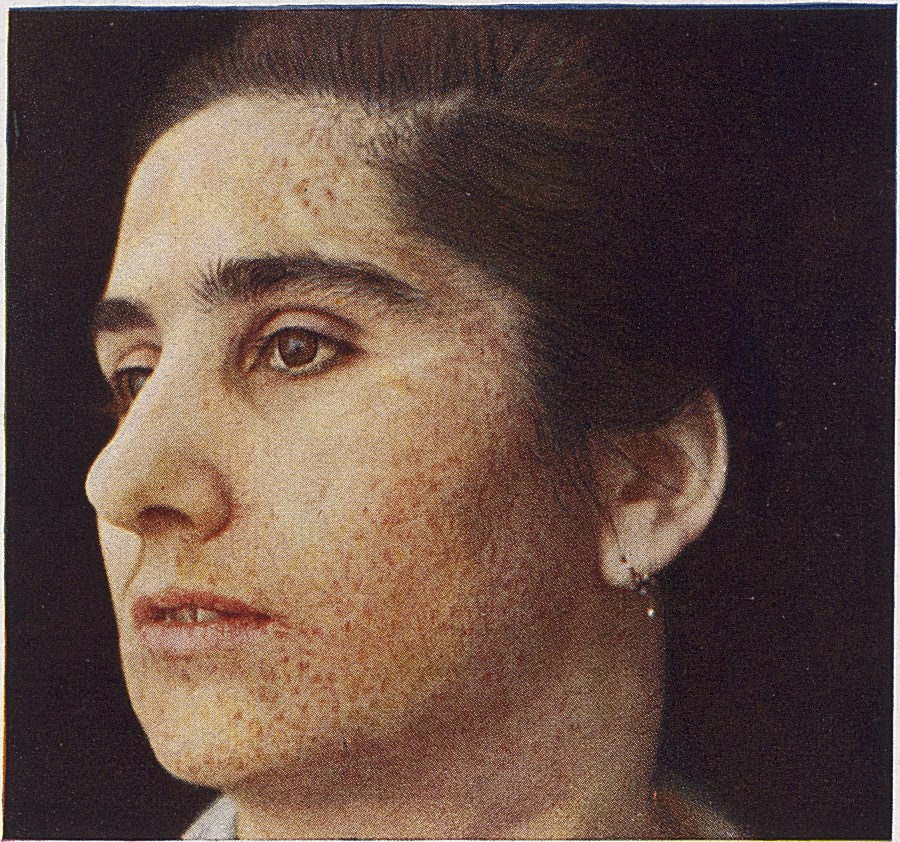
Woman with extensive flat warts on her face
