= Human skin =

Organ covering the outside of the human body

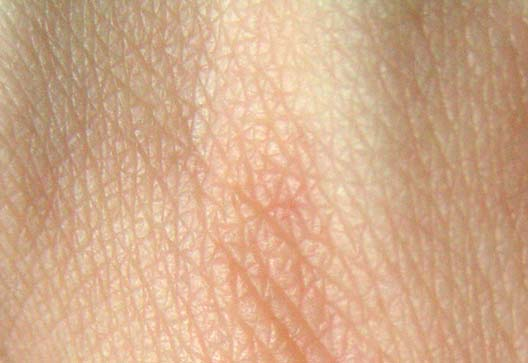
- Skin of a human hand

Details
- System: Integumentary system

Identifiers
- Latin: cutis
- TA98: A16.0.00.002
- TA2: 7041
- TH: H3.12.00.1.00001
- FMA: 7163

The human skin is the outer covering of the body and is the largest organ of the integumentary system. The skin has up to seven layers of ectodermal tissue guarding muscles, bones, ligaments and internal organs. Human skin is similar to most of the other mammals' skin, and it is very similar to pig skin. Though nearly all human skin is covered with hair follicles, it can appear hairless. There are two general types of skin: hairy and glabrous skin (hairless). The adjective cutaneous literally means "of the skin" (from Latin cutis, skin).

Skin plays an important immunity role in protecting the body against pathogens and excessive water loss. Its other functions are insulation, temperature regulation, sensation, synthesis of vitamin D, and the protection of vitamin B folates. Severely damaged skin will try to heal by forming scar tissue. This is often discoloured and depigmented.

In humans, skin pigmentation (affected by melanin) varies among populations, and skin type can range from dry to non-dry and from oily to non-oily. Such skin variety provides a rich and diverse habitat for the approximately one thousand species of bacteria from nineteen phyla which have been found on human skin.

== Structure ==
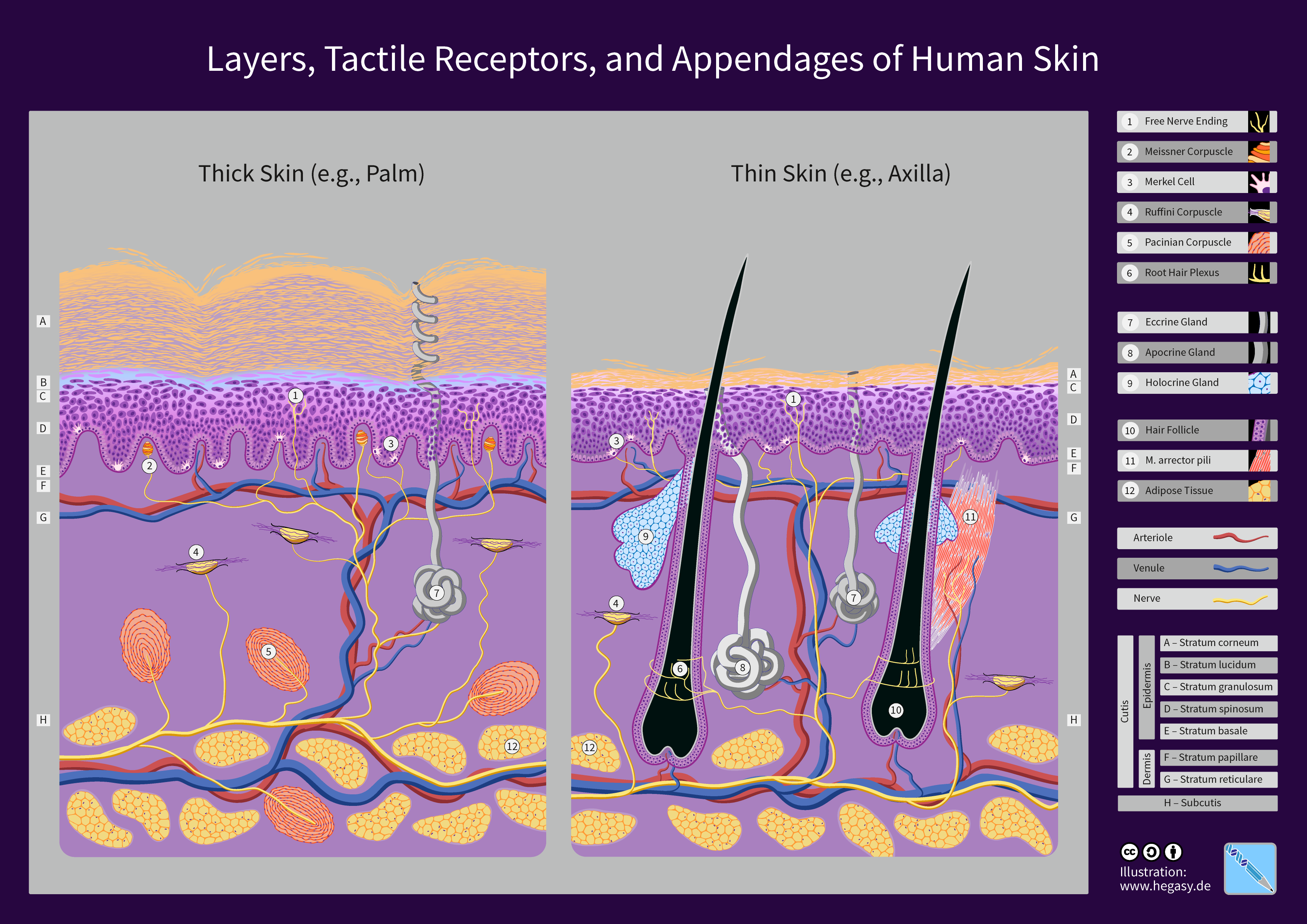
Layers, receptors, and appendages of human skin

Human skin shares anatomical, physiological, biochemical and immunological properties with other mammalian lines. Pig skin especially shares similar epidermal and dermal thickness ratios to human skin: pig and human skin share similar hair follicle and blood vessel patterns; biochemically the dermal collagen and elastin content is similar in pig and human skin; and pig skin and human skin have similar physical responses to various growth factors.

Skin has mesodermal cells which produce pigmentation, such as melanin provided by melanocytes, which absorb some of the potentially dangerous ultraviolet radiation (UV) in sunlight. It contains DNA repair enzymes that help reverse UV damage. People lacking the genes for these enzymes have high rates of skin cancer. One form predominantly produced by UV light, melanoma, is particularly invasive, causing it to spread quickly, and can often be deadly. Human skin pigmentation varies substantially between populations; this has led to the classification of people(s) on the basis of skin colour.

The skin is the largest organ in the human body, comprising roughly 16% of body mass. The skin has the second largest surface area in the human body (the inner lining of the intestinal tract is 15 to 20 times larger). For the average adult human, the skin has a surface area of 1.5–2.0 square metres (16–22 sq ft). The thickness of the skin varies considerably over all parts of the body, and between men and women, and young and old. An example is the skin on the forearm, which is on average 1.3 mm in males and 1.26 mm in females. One average square inch (6.5 cm^{2}) of skin holds 650 sweat glands, 20 blood vessels, 60,000 melanocytes, and more than 1,000 nerve endings. The average human skin cell is about 30 μm in diameter, ranging from 25 to 40 μm^{2}, depending on a variety of factors.

Skin is composed of three primary layers: the epidermis, the dermis and the hypodermis (more commonly called the subcutaneous layer).

=== Epidermis ===
The epidermis, "epi" coming from the Greek language meaning "over" or "upon", is the outermost layer of the skin. It forms the waterproof, protective wrap over the body's surface, which also serves as a barrier to infection and is made up of stratified squamous epithelium with an underlying basal lamina.

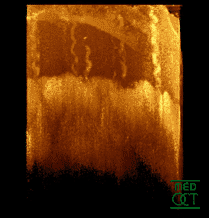
2D projection of a 3D OCT-tomogram of the skin at the fingertip, depicting the stratum corneum (≈500 μm thick) with the stratum disjunctum on top and the stratum lucidum in the middle. At the bottom are the superficial parts of the dermis. The sweat ducts are clearly visible. (See also: Rotating 3D Version)

The epidermis contains no blood vessels, and cells in the deepest layers are nourished almost exclusively by diffused oxygen from the surrounding air and to a far lesser degree by blood capillaries extending to the outer layers of the dermis. The main type of cells that make up the epidermis are Merkel cells, keratinocytes, with melanocytes and Langerhans cells also present. The epidermis can be further subdivided into the following strata (beginning with the outermost layer): corneum, lucidum (only in palms of hands and bottoms of feet), granulosum, spinosum, and basale. Cells are formed through mitosis at the basale layer. The daughter cells (see cell division) move up the strata changing shape and composition as they die due to isolation from their blood source. The cytoplasm is released and the protein keratin is inserted. They eventually reach the corneum and slough off (desquamation). This process is called "keratinization". This keratinized layer of skin is responsible for keeping water in the body and keeping other harmful chemicals and pathogens out, making skin a natural barrier to infection.

==== Sublayers ====
The epidermis is divided into the following 5 sublayers or strata:

- Stratum corneum
- Stratum lucidum
- Stratum granulosum
- Stratum spinosum
- Stratum basale (also called "stratum germinativum")

Blood capillaries are found beneath the epidermis and are linked to an arteriole and a venule. Arterial shunt vessels may bypass the network in ears, the nose and fingertips.

==== Genes and proteins expressed in the epidermis ====
About 70% of all human protein-coding genes are expressed in the skin. Almost 500 genes have an elevated pattern of expression in the skin. There are fewer than 100 genes that are specific for the skin, and these are expressed in the epidermis. An analysis of the corresponding proteins show that these are mainly expressed in keratinocytes and have functions related to squamous differentiation and cornification.

=== Dermis ===
The dermis is the layer of skin beneath the epidermis that consists of connective tissue and cushions the body from stress and strain. The dermis is tightly connected to the epidermis by a basement membrane. It also harbours many nerve endings that provide the sense of touch and heat. It contains the hair follicles, sweat glands, sebaceous glands, apocrine glands, lymphatic vessels and blood vessels. The blood vessels in the dermis provide nourishment and waste removal from its own cells as well as from the stratum basale of the epidermis.

The dermis is structurally divided into two areas: a superficial area adjacent to the epidermis, called the papillary region, and a deep thicker area known as the reticular region.

==== Papillary region ====
The papillary region is composed of loose areolar connective tissue. It is named for its finger-like projections called papillae, which extend toward the epidermis. The papillae provide the dermis with a "bumpy" surface that interdigitates with the epidermis, strengthening the connection between the two layers of skin.

In the palms, fingers, soles, and toes, the influence of the papillae projecting into the epidermis forms contours in the skin's surface. These epidermal ridges occur in patterns (see: fingerprint) that are genetically and epigenetically determined and are therefore unique to the individual, making it possible to use fingerprints or footprints as a means of identification.

==== Reticular region ====
The reticular region lies deep in the papillary region and is usually much thicker. It is composed of dense irregular connective tissue, and receives its name from the dense concentration of collagenous, elastic, and reticular fibres that weave throughout it. These protein fibres give the dermis its properties of strength, extensibility, and elasticity.

Also located within the reticular region are the roots of the hairs, sebaceous glands, sweat glands, receptors, nails, and blood vessels.

Tattoo ink is held in the dermis. Stretch marks, often from adolescent growth spurts, weight gain, pregnancy and obesity, are also located in the dermis.

=== Subcutaneous tissue ===
The subcutaneous tissue (also hypodermis and subcutis) is not part of the skin, but lies below the dermis of the cutis. Its purpose is to attach the skin to underlying bone and muscle as well as supplying it with blood vessels and nerves. It consists of loose connective tissue, adipose tissue and elastin. The main cell types are fibroblasts, macrophages and adipocytes (subcutaneous tissue contains 50% of body fat). Fat serves as padding and insulation for the body.

=== Cross-section ===
Skin layers, of both hairy and hairless skin

== Cell count and cell mass ==
=== Skin cell table ===
The below table identifies the skin cell count and aggregate cell mass estimates for a 70 kg adult male (ICRP-23; ICRP-89, ICRP-110).

Tissue mass is defined at 3.3 kg (ICRP-89, ICRP110) and addresses the skin's epidermis, dermis, hair follicles, and glands. The cell data is extracted from 'The Human Cell Count and Cell Size Distribution', Tissue-Table tab in the Supporting Information SO1 Dataset (xlsx). The 1200 record Dataset is supported by extensive references for cell size, cell count, and aggregate cell mass.

Detailed data for below cell groups are further subdivided into all the cell types listed in the above sections and categorized by epidermal, dermal, hair follicle, and glandular subcategories in the dataset and on the dataset's graphical website interface. While adipocytes in the hypodermal adipose tissue are treated separately in the ICRP tissue categories, fat content (minus cell-membrane-lipids) resident in the dermal layer (Table-105, ICRP-23) is addressed by the below interstitial-adipocytes in the dermal layer.

Named tissue and associated cell groups	Cell count	Aggregate cell mass (g)	Percent of total mass
Skin total	6.1E+11	846.7	100%
Adipocyte	7.3E+08	291.9	34.5%
Endothelial cell (EnCs)	1.5E+10	6.16	0.7%
Epithelial cells (EpC)	4.1E+11	313.9	37.1%
Eccrine gland	1.7E+11	105	12.4%
Epidermal keratinocytes	1.1E+11	85.5	10.1%
Hair follicle	1.3E+11	119.9	14.2%
Mechanoreceptors	4.9E+09	3.6	0.4%
Epithelial cells (EpC); non-nucleated	7.2E+10	28.2	3.3%
Fibroblasts	4.3E+10	94.6	11.2%
Myocytes	2.6E+07	0.08	0.01%
Neuroglia	8.5E+09	12.8	1.5%
Perivascular cells / Pericytes / Mural	1.5E+09	0.56	0.07%
Stem cells; epithelial (EpSC)	3.6E+09	1.50	0.2%
White blood cells	5.4E+10	97.1	11.5%
Granulocytes (mast cell)	2.2E+10	32.6	3.8%
Lymphoid	1.3E+10	1.6	0.2%
Monocyte-macrophage series	1.9E+10	62.9	7.4%

== Development ==
=== Skin colour ===
Human skin shows high skin colour variety from the darkest brown to the lightest pinkish-white hues. Human skin shows higher variation in colour than any other single mammalian species and is the result of natural selection. Skin pigmentation in humans evolved to primarily regulate the amount of ultraviolet radiation (UVR) penetrating the skin, controlling its biochemical effects.

The actual skin colour of different humans is affected by many substances, although the single most important substance determining human skin colour is the pigment melanin. Melanin is produced within the skin in cells called melanocytes and it is the main determinant of the skin colour of darker-skinned humans. The skin colour of people with light skin is determined mainly by the bluish-white connective tissue under the dermis and by the haemoglobin circulating in the veins of the dermis. The red colour underlying the skin becomes more visible, especially in the face, when, as consequence of physical exercise or the stimulation of the nervous system (anger, fear), arterioles dilate.

There are at least five different pigments that determine the colour of the skin. These pigments are present at different levels and places.

- Melanin: It is brown in colour and present in the basal layer of the epidermis.
- Melanoid: It resembles melanin but is present diffusely throughout the epidermis.
- Carotene: This pigment is yellow to orange in colour. It is present in the stratum corneum and fat cells of dermis and superficial fascia.
- Hemoglobin (also spelled haemoglobin): It is found in blood and is not a pigment of the skin but develops a purple colour.
- Oxyhemoglobin: It is also found in blood and is not a pigment of the skin. It develops a red colour.

There is a correlation between the geographic distribution of UV radiation (UVR) and the distribution of indigenous skin pigmentation around the world. Areas that highlight higher amounts of UVR reflect darker-skinned populations, generally located nearer towards the equator. Areas that are far from the tropics and closer to the poles have lower concentration of UVR, which is reflected in lighter-skinned populations.

In the same population it has been observed that adult human females are considerably lighter in skin pigmentation than males. Females need more calcium during pregnancy and lactation, and vitamin D, which is synthesized from sunlight, helps in absorbing calcium. For this reason it is thought that females may have evolved to have lighter skin in order to help their bodies absorb more calcium.

The Fitzpatrick scale is a numerical classification schema for human skin colour developed in 1975 as a way to classify the typical response of different types of skin to ultraviolet (UV) light:

I	Always burns, never tans	Pale, Fair, Freckles
II	Usually burns, sometimes tans	Fair
III	May burn, usually tans	Light Brown
IV	Rarely burns, always tans	Olive brown
V	Moderate constitutional pigmentation	Brown
VI	Marked constitutional pigmentation	Black

=== Ageing ===
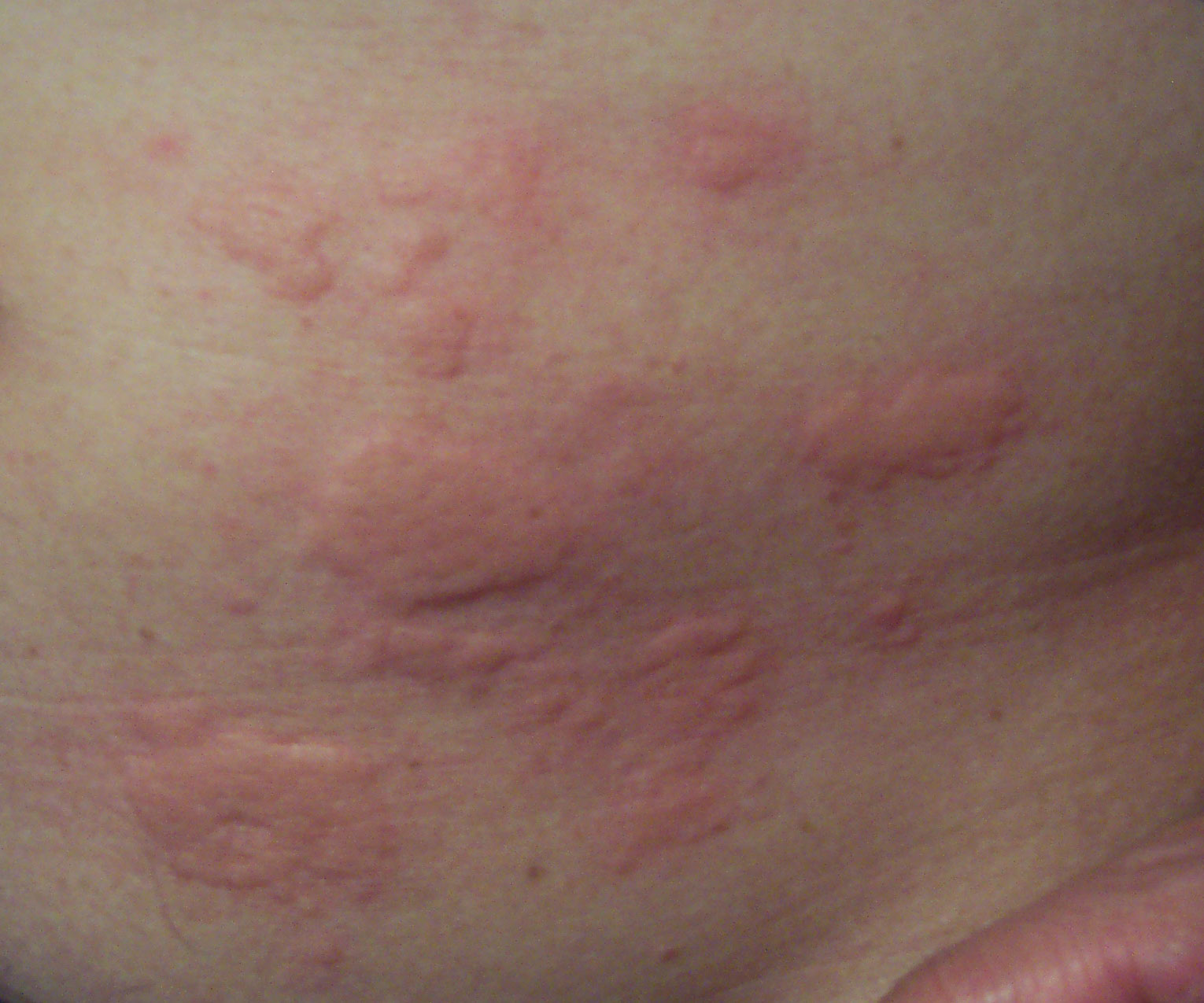
A typical rash

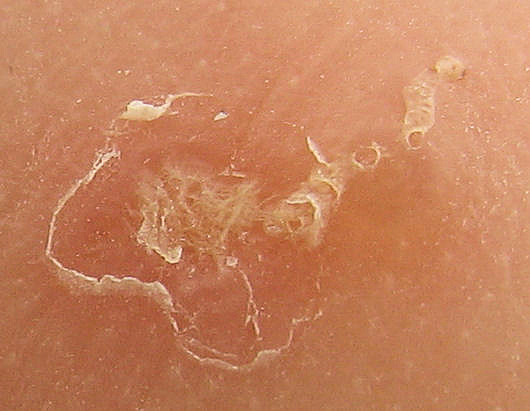
Skin infected with scabies

As skin ages, it becomes thinner and more easily damaged. Intensifying this effect is the decreasing ability of skin to heal itself as a person ages.

Among other things, skin ageing is noted by a decrease in volume and elasticity. There are many internal and external causes to skin ageing. For example, ageing skin receives less blood flow and lower glandular activity.

A validated comprehensive grading scale has categorized the clinical findings of skin ageing as laxity (sagging), rhytids (wrinkles), and the various facets of photoageing, including erythema (redness), and telangiectasia, dyspigmentation (brown discolouration), solar elastosis (yellowing), keratoses (abnormal growths) and poor texture.

Cortisol causes degradation of collagen, accelerating skin ageing.

Anti-ageing supplements are used to treat skin ageing.

==== Photoageing ====
Photoageing has two main concerns: an increased risk for skin cancer and the appearance of damaged skin. In younger skin, sun damage will heal faster since the cells in the epidermis have a faster turnover rate, while in the older population the skin becomes thinner and the epidermis turnover rate for cell repair is lower, which may result in the dermis layer being damaged.

=== UV-induced DNA damage ===
UV-irradiation of human skin cells generates damages in DNA through direct photochemical reactions at adjacent thymine or cytosine residues on the same strand of DNA. Cyclobutane pyrimidine dimers formed by two adjacent thymine bases, or by two adjacent cytosine bases, in DNA are the most frequent types of DNA damage induced by UV. Humans, as well as other organisms, are capable of repairing such UV-induced damages by the process of nucleotide excision repair. In humans this repair process protects against skin cancer.

== Types ==
Though most human skin is covered with hair follicles, some parts can be hairless. There are two general types of skin, hairy and glabrous skin (hairless). The adjective cutaneous means "of the skin" (from Latin cutis, skin).

== Functions ==
Skin performs the following functions:

1. Protection: an anatomical barrier from pathogens and damage between the internal and external environment in bodily defence; Langerhans cells in the skin are part of the adaptive immune system. Perspiration contains lysozyme that break the bonds within the cell walls of bacteria.
2. Sensation: contains a variety of nerve endings that react to heat and cold, touch, pressure, vibration, and tissue injury; see somatosensory system and haptics.
3. Heat regulation: the skin contains a blood supply far greater than its requirements, which allows precise control of energy loss by radiation, convection and conduction. Dilated blood vessels increase perfusion and heat loss, while constricted vessels greatly reduce cutaneous blood flow and conserve heat.
4. Control of evaporation: the skin provides a relatively dry and semi-impermeable barrier to fluid loss. Loss of this function contributes to the massive fluid loss in burns.
5. Aesthetics and communication: others see skin and can assess mood, physical state and attractiveness.
6. Storage and synthesis: acts as a storage centre for lipids and water, as well as a means of synthesis of vitamin D by action of UV on certain parts of the skin.
7. Excretion: sweat contains urea, however its concentration is 1/130th that of urine, hence excretion by sweating is at most a secondary function to temperature regulation.
8. Absorption: the cells comprising the outermost 0.25–0.40 mm of the skin are "almost exclusively supplied by external oxygen", although the "contribution to total respiration is negligible". In addition, medicine can be administered through the skin, by ointments or by means of adhesive patch, such as the nicotine patch or iontophoresis. The skin is an important site of transport in many other organisms.
9. Water resistance: The skin acts as a water-resistant barrier so essential nutrients are not washed out of the body.

=== Skin flora ===
The human skin is a rich environment for microbes. Around 1,000 species of bacteria from 19 bacterial phyla have been found. Most come from only four phyla: Actinomycetota (51.8%), Bacillota (24.4%), Pseudomonadota (16.5%), and Bacteroidota (6.3%). Propionibacteria and Staphylococci species were the main species in sebaceous areas. There are three main ecological areas: moist, dry and sebaceous. In moist places on the body Corynebacteria together with Staphylococci dominate. In dry areas, there is a mixture of species but dominated by Betaproteobacteria and Flavobacteriales. Ecologically, sebaceous areas had greater species richness than moist and dry ones. The areas with least similarity between people in species were the spaces between fingers, the spaces between toes, axillae, and umbilical cord stump. Most similarly were beside the nostril, nares (inside the nostril), and on the back.

Reflecting upon the diversity of the human skin researchers on the human skin microbiome have observed: "hairy, moist underarms lie a short distance from smooth dry forearms, but these two niches are likely as ecologically dissimilar as rainforests are to deserts."

The NIH conducted the Human Microbiome Project to characterize the human microbiota, which includes that on the skin and the role of this microbiome in health and disease.

Microorganisms like Staphylococcus epidermidis colonize the skin surface. The density of skin flora depends on region of the skin. The disinfected skin surface gets recolonized from bacteria residing in the deeper areas of the hair follicle, gut and urogenital openings.

== Clinical significance ==
Diseases of the skin include skin infections and skin neoplasms (including skin cancer). Dermatology is the branch of medicine that deals with conditions of the skin.

There are seven cervical, twelve thoracic, five lumbar, and five sacral. Certain diseases like shingles, caused by varicella-zoster infection, have pain sensations and eruptive rashes involving dermatomal distribution. Dermatomes are helpful in the diagnosis of vertebral spinal injury levels. Aside from the dermatomes, the epidermis cells are susceptible to neoplastic changes, resulting in various cancer types.

The skin is also valuable for diagnosis of other conditions, since many medical signs show through the skin. Skin colour affects the visibility of these signs, a source of misdiagnosis in unaware medical personnel.

== Society and culture ==
=== Hygiene and skin care ===
The skin supports its own ecosystems of microorganisms, including yeasts and bacteria, which cannot be removed by any amount of cleaning. Estimates place the number of individual bacteria on the surface of human skin at 7.8 million per square centimetre (50 million per square inch), though this figure varies greatly over the average 1.9 square metres (20 sq ft) of human skin. Oily surfaces, such as the face, may contain over 78 million bacteria per square centimetre (500 million per square inch). Despite these vast quantities, all of the bacteria found on the skin's surface would fit into a volume the size of a pea. In general, the microorganisms keep one another in check and are part of a healthy skin. When the balance is disturbed, there may be an overgrowth and infection, such as when antibiotics kill microbes, resulting in an overgrowth of yeast. The skin is continuous with the inner epithelial lining of the body at the orifices, each of which supports its own complement of microbes.

Cosmetics should be used carefully on the skin because these may cause allergic reactions. Each season requires suitable clothing in order to facilitate the evaporation of the sweat. Sunlight, water and air play an important role in keeping the skin healthy.

==== Oily skin ====
Oily skin is caused by over-active sebaceous glands, that produce a substance called sebum, a naturally healthy skin lubricant. A high glycemic-index diet and dairy products (except for cheese) consumption increase IGF-1 generation, which in turn increases sebum production. Overwashing the skin does not cause sebum overproduction but may cause dryness.

When the skin produces excessive sebum, it becomes heavy and thick in texture, known as oily skin. Oily skin is typified by shininess, blemishes and pimples. The oily-skin type is not necessarily bad, since such skin is less prone to wrinkling, or other signs of ageing, because the oil helps to keep needed moisture locked into the epidermis (outermost layer of skin). The negative aspect of the oily-skin type is that oily complexions are especially susceptible to clogged pores, blackheads, and buildup of dead skin cells on the surface of the skin. Oily skin can be sallow and rough in texture and tends to have large, clearly visible pores everywhere, except around the eyes and neck.

== Permeability ==
Human skin has a low permeability; that is, most foreign substances are unable to penetrate and diffuse through the skin. Skin's outermost layer, the stratum corneum, is an effective barrier to most inorganic nanosized particles. This protects the body from external particles such as toxins by not allowing them to come into contact with internal tissues. However, in some cases it is desirable to allow particles entry to the body through the skin. Potential medical applications of such particle transfer has prompted developments in nanomedicine and biology to increase skin permeability. One application of transcutaneous particle delivery could be to locate and treat cancer. Nanomedical researchers seek to target the epidermis and other layers of active cell division where nanoparticles can interact directly with cells that have lost their growth-control mechanisms (cancer cells). Such direct interaction could be used to more accurately diagnose properties of specific tumours or to treat them by delivering drugs with cellular specificity.

=== Nanoparticles ===
Nanoparticles 40 nm in diameter and smaller have been successful in penetrating the skin. Research confirms that nanoparticles larger than 40 nm do not penetrate the skin past the stratum corneum. Most particles that do penetrate will diffuse through skin cells, but some will travel down hair follicles and reach the dermis layer.

The permeability of skin relative to different shapes of nanoparticles has also been studied. Research has shown that spherical particles have a better ability to penetrate the skin compared to oblong (ellipsoidal) particles because spheres are symmetric in all three spatial dimensions. One study compared the two shapes and recorded data that showed spherical particles located deep in the epidermis and dermis whereas ellipsoidal particles were mainly found in the stratum corneum and epidermal layers. Nanorods are used in experiments because of their unique fluorescent properties but have shown mediocre penetration.

Nanoparticles of different materials have shown skin's permeability limitations. In many experiments, gold nanoparticles 40 nm in diameter or smaller are used and have shown to penetrate to the epidermis. Titanium oxide (TiO_{2}), zinc oxide (ZnO), and silver nanoparticles are ineffective in penetrating the skin past the stratum corneum. Cadmium selenide (CdSe) quantum dots have proven to penetrate very effectively when they have certain properties. Because CdSe is toxic to living organisms, the particle must be covered in a surface group. An experiment comparing the permeability of quantum dots coated in polyethylene glycol (PEG), PEG-amine, and carboxylic acid concluded the PEG and PEG-amine surface groups allowed for the greatest penetration of particles. The carboxylic acid coated particles did not penetrate past the stratum corneum.

=== Increasing permeability ===
Scientists previously believed that the skin was an effective barrier to inorganic particles. Damage from mechanical stressors was believed to be the only way to increase its permeability.

Recently, simpler and more effective methods for increasing skin permeability have been developed. Ultraviolet radiation (UVR) slightly damages the surface of skin and causes a time-dependent defect allowing easier penetration of nanoparticles. The UVR's high energy causes a restructuring of cells, weakening the boundary between the stratum corneum and the epidermal layer. The damage of the skin is typically measured by the transepidermal water loss (TEWL), though it may take 3–5 days for the TEWL to reach its peak value. When the TEWL reaches its highest value, the maximum density of nanoparticles is able to permeate the skin. While the effect of increased permeability after UVR exposure can lead to an increase in the number of particles that permeate the skin, the specific permeability of skin after UVR exposure relative to particles of different sizes and materials has not been determined.

There are other methods to increase nanoparticle penetration by skin damage: tape stripping is the process in which tape is applied to skin then lifted to remove the top layer of skin; skin abrasion is done by shaving the top 5–10 μm off the surface of the skin; chemical enhancement applies chemicals such as polyvinylpyrrolidone (PVP), dimethyl sulfoxide (DMSO), and oleic acid to the surface of the skin to increase permeability; electroporation increases skin permeability by the application of short pulses of electric fields. The pulses are high voltage and on the order of milliseconds when applied. Charged molecules penetrate the skin more frequently than neutral molecules after the skin has been exposed to electric field pulses. Results have shown molecules on the order of 100 μm to easily permeate electroporated skin.

=== Applications ===
A large area of interest in nanomedicine is the transdermal patch because of the possibility of a painless application of therapeutic agents with very few side effects. Transdermal patches have been limited to administer a small number of drugs, such as nicotine, because of the limitations in permeability of the skin. Development of techniques that increase skin permeability has led to more drugs that can be applied via transdermal patches and more options for patients.

Increasing the permeability of skin allows nanoparticles to penetrate and target cancer cells. Nanoparticles along with multi-modal imaging techniques have been used as a way to diagnose cancer non-invasively. Skin with high permeability allowed quantum dots with an antibody attached to the surface for active targeting to successfully penetrate and identify cancerous tumours in mice. Tumour targeting is beneficial because the particles can be excited using fluorescence microscopy and emit light energy and heat that will destroy cancer cells.

=== Sunblock and sunscreen ===
Sunblock and sunscreen are different important skin-care products though both offer full protection from the sun.

Sunblock—Sunblock is opaque and stronger than sunscreen, since it is able to block most of the UVA/UVB rays and radiation from the sun, and does not need to be reapplied several times in a day. Titanium dioxide and zinc oxide are two of the important ingredients in sunblock.

Sunscreen—Sunscreen is more transparent once applied to the skin and also has the ability to protect against UVA/UVB rays, although the sunscreen's ingredients have the ability to break down at a faster rate once exposed to sunlight, and some of the radiation is able to penetrate to the skin. In order for sunscreen to be more effective it is necessary to consistently reapply and use one with a higher sun protection factor.

=== Diet ===
Vitamin A, also known as retinoids, benefits the skin by normalizing keratinization, downregulating sebum production, which contributes to acne, and reversing and treating photodamage, striae, and cellulite.

Vitamin D and analogues are used to downregulate the cutaneous immune system and epithelial proliferation while promoting differentiation.

Vitamin C is an antioxidant that regulates collagen synthesis, forms barrier lipids, regenerates vitamin E, and provides photoprotection.

Vitamin E is a membrane antioxidant that protects against oxidative damage caused most commonly in skin by UV rays.

Several scientific studies confirmed that changes in baseline nutritional status affect skin condition.

The Mayo Clinic lists foods they state help the skin: fruits and vegetables, whole grains, dark leafy greens, nuts, and seeds.

== See also ==
- Acid mantle
- Anthropodermic bibliopegy
- Artificial skin
- Callus – Thick area of skin
- Cutaneous structure development
- Fingerprint – Skin on fingertips
- Human body
- Hyperpigmentation – About excess skin colour
- Intertriginous
- List of cutaneous conditions
- Meissner's corpuscle
- Nude beaches
- Nude swimming
- Nudity
- Pacinian corpuscle
- Polyphenol antioxidant
- Skin cancer
- Skin lesion
- Skin repair
- Sunbathing
