= Friction burn =

Skin abrasion caused by friction

- Other names: Carpet burn, rope burn, rug burn, sand burn, brush burn
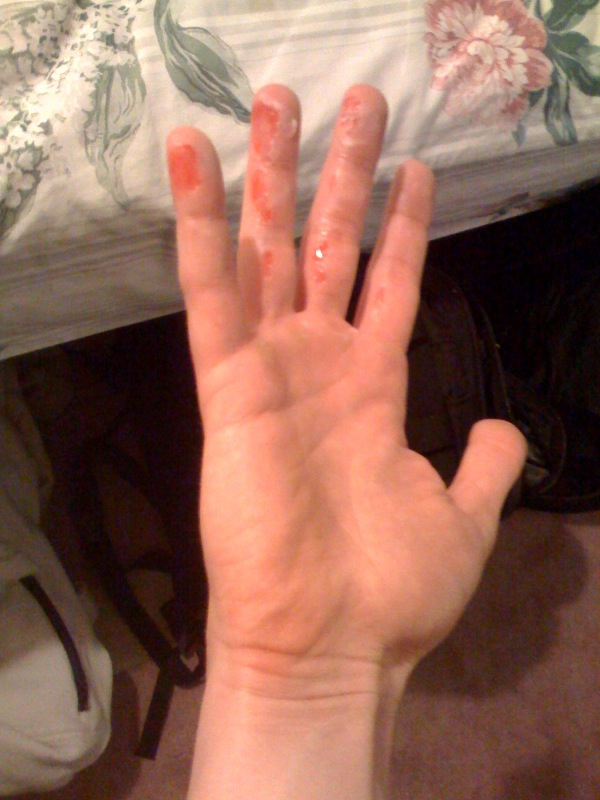
- Friction burn caused by a rope
- Specialty: Dermatology
- Causes: Carpet, rope, rug, treadmill, sand, swingset

Friction burn caused by a treadmill. Example of a third-degree friction burn

A friction burn is an extreme form of chafing (skin), or abrasion caused by the friction of skin rubbing against a surface. A friction burn may also be referred to as skinning, or a term named for the surface causing the burn such as rope burn, carpet burn or rug burn. Because friction generates heat, extreme cases of chafing may result in genuine thermal burning of the outer layers of skin.

The dermal papillae may be exposed after top layers of the epidermis (stratum corneum, stratum granulosum, stratum spinosum and stratum basale) have been removed. This is often uncomfortable and even painful, but rarely results in bleeding.

A person's own skin (or the skin of another person) may be sufficient to act as an abrasive surface to cause friction burn. More commonly, friction with abrasive surfaces, including clothing, carpet, or rope, can lead to a friction burn. Common places at which skin-to-skin chafing can occur are between the thighs and under the armpits. Friction burns are very common with clothing such as pants on the knees caused by playing sports or sliding on wooden surfaces.

Less dangerous friction burns can occur frequently on sensitive skin surfaces such as the genitals, such as during sexual intercourse or masturbation.

The risks of a friction burn include infection and temporary or permanent scarring.

== Treatments ==
Most minor cases of a friction burn require little to no treatment, as a specific case of allergy might aggravate the burn.

Treatments for friction burns usually involve application of an anti-inflammatory cream. Pain relieving medication may also be taken.
