= Hyram Yarbro =

American skincare influencer (born 1996)

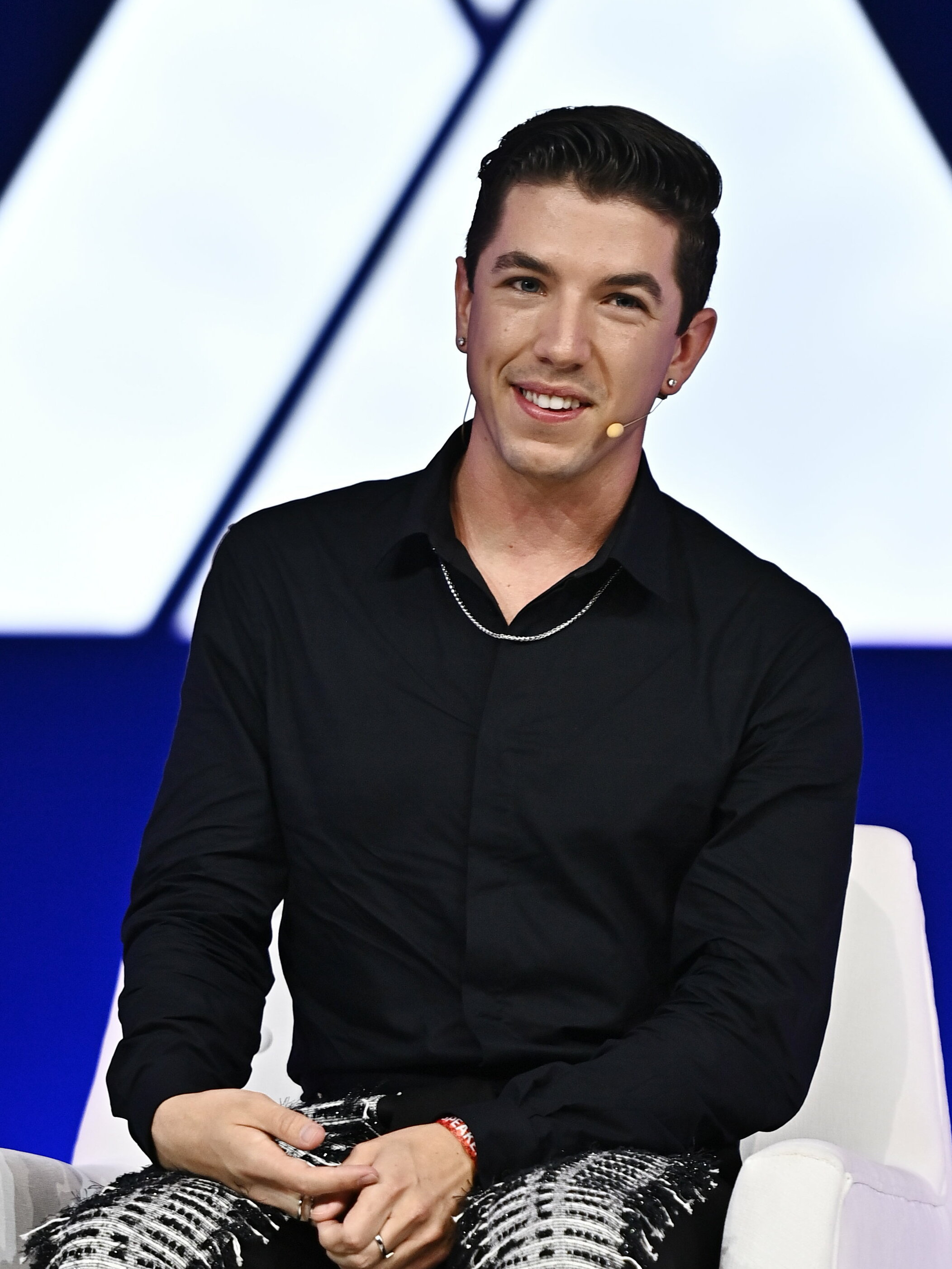
- Yarbro in 2022
- Born: Hyram Yarbro; April 20, 1996 (age 30); Prescott, Arizona, U.S.

TikTok information
- Page: Hyram
- Followers: 5.6 million

YouTube information
- Channel: Hyram
- Years active: 2017–present
- Genre: Beauty
- Subscribers: 4.4 million
- Views: 559 million
- Last updated: December 15th 2025

Hyram Yarbro (born April 20, 1996) is an American skincare influencer known for his videos on YouTube and TikTok. His videos consist primarily of product reviews, skincare advice, and reactions to celebrity skincare routine videos. In 2021, he launched his skincare product line, Selfless by Hyram, in collaboration with Sephora.

== Early life and education ==
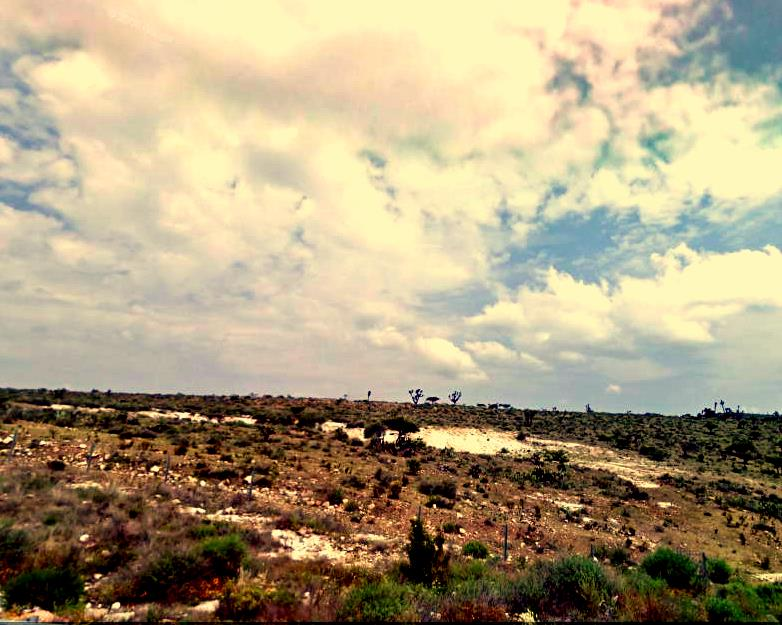
Yarbro's hometown of Paulden, Arizona

Yarbro was born on April 20, 1996, in Paulden, Arizona, and grew up on a cattle ranch. He is one of five children and has stated that his family were "strict" followers of Mormonism. As a teenager, Yarbro was forced to leave his family's home after coming out as gay. Yarbro has quoted that throughout his teens and early twenties, he suffered from depression and eating disorders, engaged in self-harm and attempted suicide.

In 2014, Yarbro moved from Arizona to Honolulu, Hawaii, to study at Brigham Young University–Hawaii. He later dropped out for financial reasons. According to Yarbro, while in college, he noticed premature aging of his skin and became interested in skincare products. He went on to work as a makeup artist at Saks Fifth Avenue. Yarbro has described his motivation for starting his YouTube channel as a response to what he saw as the widespread practice of skin-care companies misinforming consumers about dermatology in order to increase the prices of their products.

== Career ==
Yarbro began his YouTube channel in 2017. His subscriber count grew from 50,000 to 500,000 in under two weeks in 2019, and reached one million before the end of the year. He joined TikTok in 2020 and quickly gained a large following during the COVID-19 lockdown, accumulating nearly six million followers during his first six months on the platform.

Between March and October 2020, Yarbro released videos about the L'Oréal sub-brand CeraVe. These videos have been said to have contributed to increased popularity and sales of the brand. During this period, his videos generated $3.2 million in media impact value for the brand, and reportedly led to an 89% increase in its global sales in 2020. This subsequently resulted in a paid partnership with L'Oréal for Yarbro to create branded content on TikTok and YouTube.

In October 2020, Yarbro signed with United Talent Agency. That December, he announced his first product collaboration, the Hyram x Kinship Sea the Good collection, with a portion of the profits donated to Lonely Whale, a charity focused on removing plastic from oceans. In 2022, he launched the podcast Justaposition, focusing on mental health journeys, including his own and other influencers'. That year, he also began posting on Flip, a shopping-focused social media app. As of August 2022, he had a small following on the platform according to Glossy.

=== Selfless by Hyram ===
In June 2021, Yarbro launched his skincare product line, Selfless by Hyram, in collaboration with Colette Laxton and Mark Curry, co-founders of The Inkey List. The line, consisting of five products priced between $20 and $30, was released exclusively in Sephora stores across 29 countries and online on June 24. For the launch, Yarbro partnered with non-profits Rainforest Trust, Youth, and Thirst. The line launched in the UK in March 2022.

== Content ==
Yarbro is among a group of social media influencers known as "skinfluencers" for their focus on skincare products. GQ Australia described him as being "at the forefront of the men's skincare movement". His content includes reviews and recommendations of beauty products, skincare tutorials, and reaction videos responding to the skincare routines of fans and other online influencers. Yarbro utilizes the duet feature on TikTok to create reaction videos. Elle has noted that he also uses the duet feature to address skincare myths propagated by other users. He is known for recommending lower-priced products, generally under $50 and often under $10.

According to The Washington Post, Yarbro's brand focuses on promoting "clean beauty," emphasizing products with safe, organic ingredients. The Independent reported that he tends to avoid products containing fragrances and essential oils and prefers brands with sustainable manufacturing practices. In his content, Yarbro states that he is not a licensed dermatologist or aesthetician, referring to himself as a "skin care specialist", and advising that his content is not medical advice, but rather like "shopping with a best friend".

Yarbro's content generates revenue through affiliate links, YouTube ads, and brand sponsorships. He has stated that he declines 90 to 95% of offered brand deals based on product ingredients, price, and maintaining audience trust.

== Criticism ==
Doctors generally advise that consumers should not take skincare advice from influencers on TikTok. Yarbro has faced criticism for promoting "slugging," the practice of applying a thick layer of Vaseline to the face overnight, which dermatologists say can exacerbate acne. Nylon included excessive slugging in their list of the 10 worst TikTok beauty trends of 2021, citing Yarbro as one of the influencers who promoted it.

== Awards and nominations ==
Year	Ceremony	Category	Result	Ref.
2020	10th Streamy Awards	Beauty	Nominated	
2021	11th Streamy Awards	Beauty	Nominated	
