= Spinous cell =

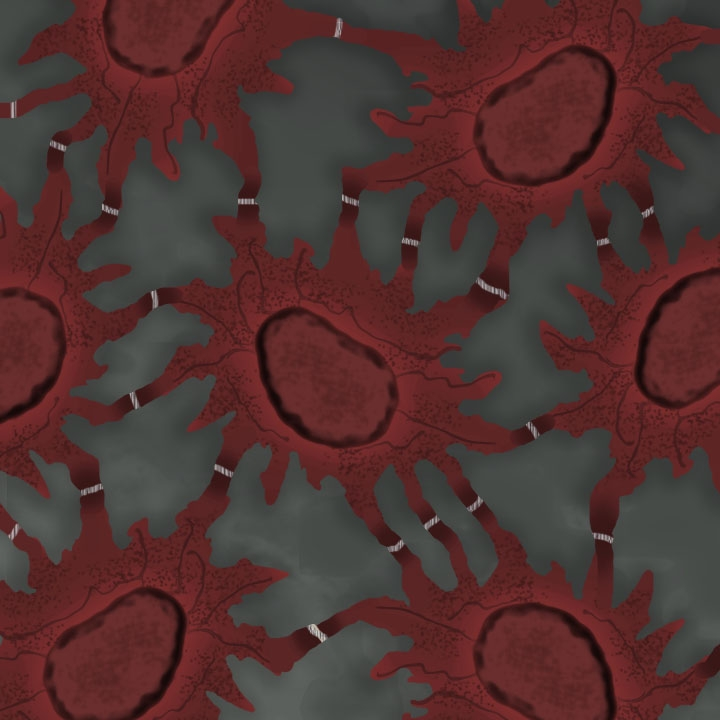
Prickle Cells Drawing - Artist: Sandy G Phillips-Long

Spinous cells, or prickle cells, are keratin producing epidermal cells owing their prickly appearance to their numerous intracellular connections. They make up the stratum spinosum (prickly layer) of the epidermis and provide a continuous net-like layer of protection for underlying tissue. They are susceptible to mutations caused by sunlight and can become malignant.

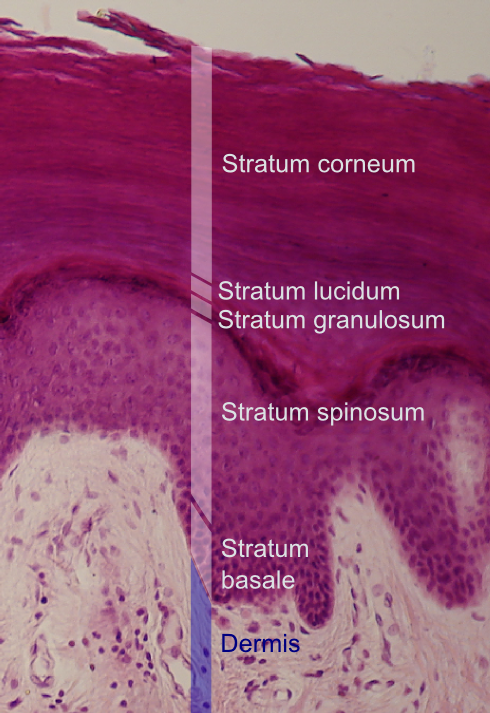
Histologic image showing a section of epidermis. Stratum spinosum labeled slightly below center.

== Location ==
Spinous cells are found in the superficial layers of the skin. They are found in the stratum spinosum (prickly layer, spinosum layer), which lies above the stratum basale (basal layer) and below the stratum granulosum (granular layer) of the epidermis. The spinous cells are arranged several layers thick to form a net-like covering.

== Origin ==
Spinous cells originate through mitosis in the basal layer (also known as the germinative layer). They are pushed upward into the stratum spinosum by the continuous formation of new cells in the basal layer. They reach the outmost layer of the skin as flattened dead flaking skin cells we shed daily. The journey from origin to shed takes 25 to 45 days.

== Function ==
Spinous cells serve “as a physical and biological barrier to the environment, preventing penetration by irritants and allergens and loss of water while maintaining internal homeostasis. They accomplish this in two ways. First, they are keratinocytes (keratin cells) whose primary function is to produce keratin, a strong structural protein. The keratin accumulates within each spinous cell as it moves upward through the epidermis layers, until the cell is almost completely filled with hardening keratin (keratinisation). Second, the cells are bound together across their cytoplasm by keratin filaments that form cell-to-cell connections (desmosomes).

== Cancer ==
Squamous cell carcinoma (prickle cell carcinoma) is relatively common in people over age 60, with fair skin, and a history of longer term sun exposure. It is not as commonly known as other skin cancers because it is less likely to metastasize, but can be just as deadly if left untreated.

== See also ==
- Stratum spinosum
