= Skin repair =

Protection from mechanical injury, chemical hazards, and bacterial invasion is provided by the skin because the epidermis is relatively thick and covered with keratin. Secretions from sebaceous glands and sweat glands also benefit this protective barrier. In the event of an injury that damages the skin's protective barrier, the body triggers a response called wound healing. After hemostasis, inflammation white blood cells, including phagocytic macrophages arrive at the injury site. Once the invading microorganisms have been brought under control, the skin proceeds to heal itself. The ability of the skin to heal even after considerable damage has occurred is due to the presence of stem cells in the dermis and cells in the stratum basale of the epidermis, all of which can generate new tissue.

When an injury extends through the epidermis into the dermis, bleeding occurs and the inflammatory response begins. Clotting mechanisms in the blood are soon activated, and a clot of scab is formed within several hours. The scab temporarily restores the integrity of the epidermis and restricts the entry of microorganisms. After the scab is formed, cells of the stratum basale begin to divide by mitosis and migrate to the edges of the scab. A week after the injury, the edges of the wound are pulled together by contraction. Contraction is an important part of the healing process when damage has been extensive, and involves shrinking in size of underlying contractile connective tissue, which brings the wound margins toward one another. In a major injury, if epithelial cell migration and tissue contraction cannot cover the wound, suturing the edges of the injured skin together, or even replacement of lost skin with skin grafts, may be required to restore the skin.

As epithelial cells continue to migrate around the scab, the dermis is repaired by the activity of stem cells. Active cells, called fibroblasts, produce collagenous fibers and ground substance. Blood vessels soon grow into the dermis, restoring circulation. If the injury is very minor, the epithelial cells eventually restore the epidermis once the dermis has been regenerated.

In major injuries, the repair mechanisms are unable to restore the skin to its original condition. The repaired region contains an abnormally large number of collagenous fibers, and relatively few blood vessels. Damaged sweat and sebaceous glands, hair follicles, muscle cells, and nerves are seldom repaired. They are usually replaced by the fibrous tissue. The result is the formation of an inflexible, fibrous scar tissue.

Human skin cells are capable of repairing UV-induced DNA damages by the process of nucleotide excision repair. This repair process protects against skin cancer.

== See also ==
- Wound healing
