= List of keratins expressed in the human integumentary system =

There are many different keratin proteins normally expressed in the human integumentary system.

Keratin protein expression within the various layers and anatomic locations of the human integumentary system
Keratin type	Location of expression
1	Suprabasal epidermis of skin
2 (2e)	Granular layer
3	Cornea
4	Suprabasal epidermis of mucosa
5	Basal layer
6a	Suprabasal palmoplantar skin
6b	Basal palmoplantar skin Nail bed Hair follicle
7	
8	
9	Suprabasal palmoplantar skin
10	Suprabasal epidermis
11	
12	Cornea
13	Suprabasal epidermis of mucosa
14	Basal layer
15	Basal layer of mucosa
16	Suprabasal palmoplantar skin
17	Basal palmoplantar skin
18	
19	Bulge region of the hair follicle
20	Merkel cell
21	

== See also ==
- List of cutaneous conditions caused by mutations in keratins
- List of target antigens in pemphigoid
- List of target antigens in pemphigus
- Cutaneous conditions with immunofluorescence findings
- List of cutaneous conditions
- List of genes mutated in cutaneous conditions
- List of histologic stains that aid in diagnosis of cutaneous conditions
