= Eleidin =

Eleidin is clear intracellular protein which is present in the stratum lucidum of the skin.

Eleidin is a transformation product of the amino acid complex keratohyalin, the lifeless matter deposited in the form of minute granules within the protoplasm of living cells. Eleidin is then converted to keratin in the stratum corneum.

Eleidin can be found in the vermilion border of the lip. The lip is thinly keratinized and has a high concentration of eleidin. The red appearance of the vermillion border is due to several factors, one of which is the transparent nature of eleidin showing the color of the red blood cells beneath.
