= Stratum lucidum =

Thin layer of dead skin cells

Histologic image showing a section of epidermis. Stratum lucidum labeled near center.

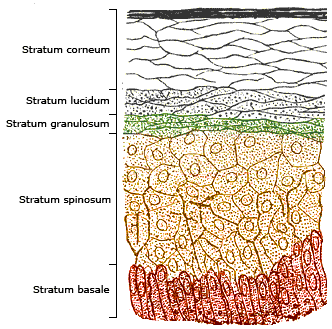
Section of epidermis

The stratum lucidum (Latin, 'clear layer') is a thin, clear layer of dead skin cells in the epidermis named for its translucent appearance under a microscope. It is readily visible by light microscopy only in areas of thick skin, which are found on the palms of the hands and the soles of the feet.

Located between the stratum granulosum and stratum corneum layers, it is composed of three to five layers of dead, flattened keratinocytes. The keratinocytes of the stratum lucidum do not feature distinct boundaries and are filled with eleidin, an intermediate form of keratin. They are surrounded by an oily substance that is the result of the exocytosis of lamellar bodies accumulated while the keratinocytes are moving through the stratum spinosum and stratum granulosum.

The thickness of the stratum lucidum is controlled by the rate of mitosis (division) of the epidermal cells. Melanosomes in the stratum basale determine the darkness of the stratum lucidum.
