= CeraVe =

Dermatology and skin care company

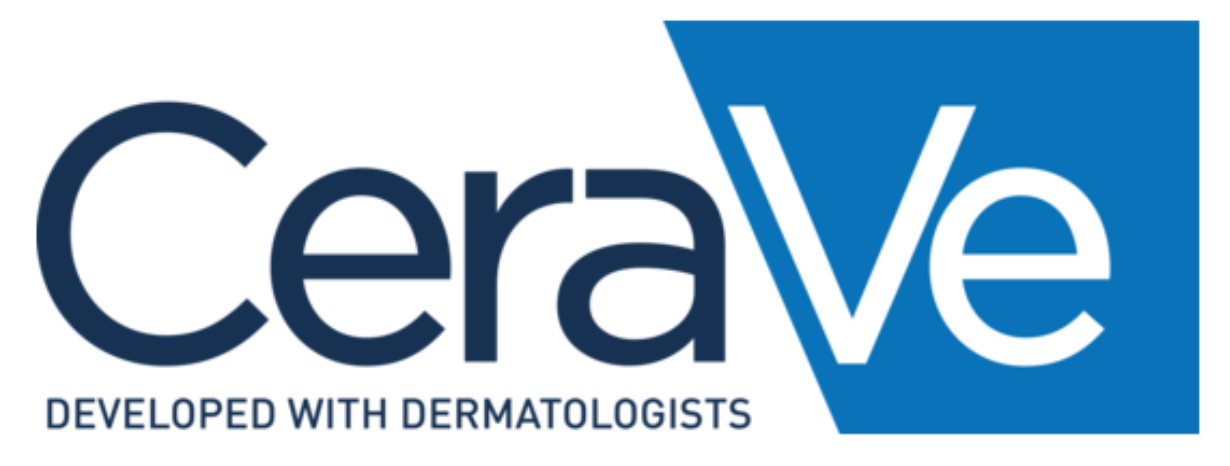
- Industry: Dermatology
- Founded: 2005
- Founder: Bausch Health
- Owner: L'Oréal
- Website: www.cerave.com

CeraVe is a company specializing in dermatology and the manufacturing and marketing of skin care products. It is owned by L'Oréal and is a subsidiary of L'Oréal Dermatological Beauty.

== History ==
CeraVe was founded in 2005 and was owned by the pharmaceutical company Bausch Health (known as Valeant at that time). In 2017, it was sold and acquired by L'Oréal along with 2 other companies (AcneFree and Ambi) for $1.3 billion.

Between March and October 2020, CeraVe was widely promoted by social media skin care influencer Hyram Yarbro. During this period, his videos generated $3.2 million in media impact value for the brand, and reportedly led to an 89% increase in its global sales in 2020.

In 2024 the brand aired a commercial featuring Michael Cera during the Super Bowl LVIII leveraging the similarity between the two names for comedic effect.

== Products ==
The company manufactures and markets multiple skin care products primarily used to treat acne, eczema, dry skin. Products are frequently marketed for the ceramides in them. A notable product is CeraVe moisturizing cream, which The New York Times researched and discovered has ceramides, glycerin, and petrolatum.
