= Chafing (skin) =

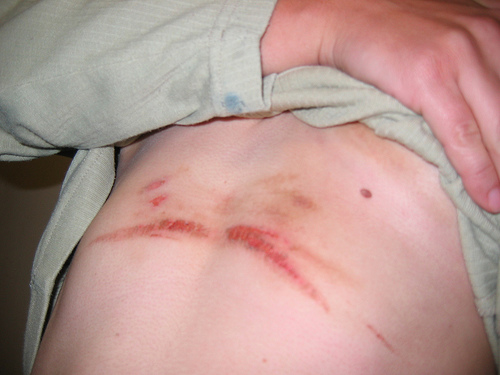
- Chafing of skin

Chafing is an irritation or superficial abrasion of skin caused by friction, moisture or irritating fabric. Prolonged rubbing on the skin may result in skin sting or burn, and development of a mild, red rash or boils; and in severe cases may include swelling, bleeding, or crusting. It often results from body parts that rub against each other or against clothing. It commonly occurs on the inner thighs and buttocks, and nipples, groin, feet, and armpits can also chafe, although there it is less common. Severe chafing is known as friction burn.

== Causes ==
Repeated rubbing, especially combined with moisture, cause chafing.

Chafing may be caused by clothing rubbing against the skin. Chafing can also be caused by improper or overly loose fitting clothing generating extra friction. Wearing a skirt, especially in hot or humid weather, may cause chafing in the upper thighs. Wearing leggings or pants can protect thighs from such rubbing. Ill-fitting clothes can cause chafing; repeatedly rubbing against sleeves, bra straps, or waistband may cause chafing. A watch strap may also cause chafing. "Jogger's nipples" is the name for chafed nipples caused by a shirt rubbing on nipples while running.

Obesity is commonly thought to be a cause of thigh chafing, and in some cases losing body fat may help the issue, but the problem is just as noticeable in athletes with well-developed quadriceps and people with tight bone structures. Chafing is quite prevalent among long-distance athletes such as cyclists or marathon runners due to the extensive time periods during which the skin is in irritating conditions. Many athletes even quit a race if chafing becomes severe.

Chafing may be caused by the salt and residue left behind after sweat evaporates. If sweat dries and exercise is resumed, the salt may intensify the friction and cause further irritation. Other contributing factors include hot weather, sensitive skin, sand from the beach getting into problem areas, and prior skin irritation.

Nursing mothers may develop chafed nipples from breastfeeding, and prolonged exposure to urine or feces and not enough air flow can cause chafing on the buttocks, such as from diapers. Other ways of chafing includes repeatedly blowing the nose when having a cold or wearing a face mask.

== Prevention and treatment ==
Staying dry may keep skin from the developing further chafing, although this can be difficult in hot weather and requires avoiding exercise. After a workout, a wash removes sweat and its salt which causes chafing. The use of products such as baby powder, potato flour or antiperspirant may help with keeping problem areas dry. An alternative to staying dry is lubricating the skin with petroleum jelly, deodorant, or other lubricants to reduce friction and allow body parts to glide.

In many cases, however, especially those involving the upper thighs, clothing is the greatest factor. Cotton clothes should be avoided, as should anything with large seams. Sports focused underwear and clothing made from polyester, nylon or spandex may reduce or entirely solve the issue in some cases. Thigh bands are one type of anti-chafing garment used to minimize skin-to-skin friction in the inner thigh area. Problems caused by salt residue from evaporated sweat can be solved by using wet wipes to clean problem areas before resuming exercise.

Once the cause of the irritation is removed, the affected skin area will normally heal in a few days. Severe cases (friction burn) may become infected and require medical attention. They may also leave scars upon healing.
