= Intrinsic and extrinsic ageing =

Intrinsic ageing and extrinsic ageing are terms used to describe cutaneous ageing of the skin and other parts of the integumentary system, which while having epidermal concomitants, seems to primarily involve the dermis. Intrinsic ageing is influenced by internal physiological factors alone, and extrinsic ageing by many external factors. Intrinsic ageing is also called chronologic ageing, and extrinsic ageing is most often referred to as photoageing.

== Causes and effects ==
The effects of intrinsic ageing are caused primarily by internal factors alone. It is sometimes referred to as chronological ageing and is an inherent degenerative process due to declining physiologic functions and capacities. Such an ageing process may include qualitative and quantitative changes and includes diminished or defective synthesis of collagen and elastin in the dermis.

Extrinsic ageing of skin is a distinctive declination process caused by external factors, which include ultra-violet radiation, cigarette smoking, air pollution, among others. Of all extrinsic causes, radiation from sunlight has the most widespread documentation of its negative effects on the skin. Because of this, extrinsic ageing is often referred to as photoageing. Photoageing may be defined as skin changes caused by chronic exposure to UV light. Photodamage implies changes beyond those associated with ageing alone, defined as cutaneous damage caused by chronic exposure to solar radiation and is associated with emergence of neoplastic lesions.
