= Merkel cell =

Receptors in the skin of vertebrates

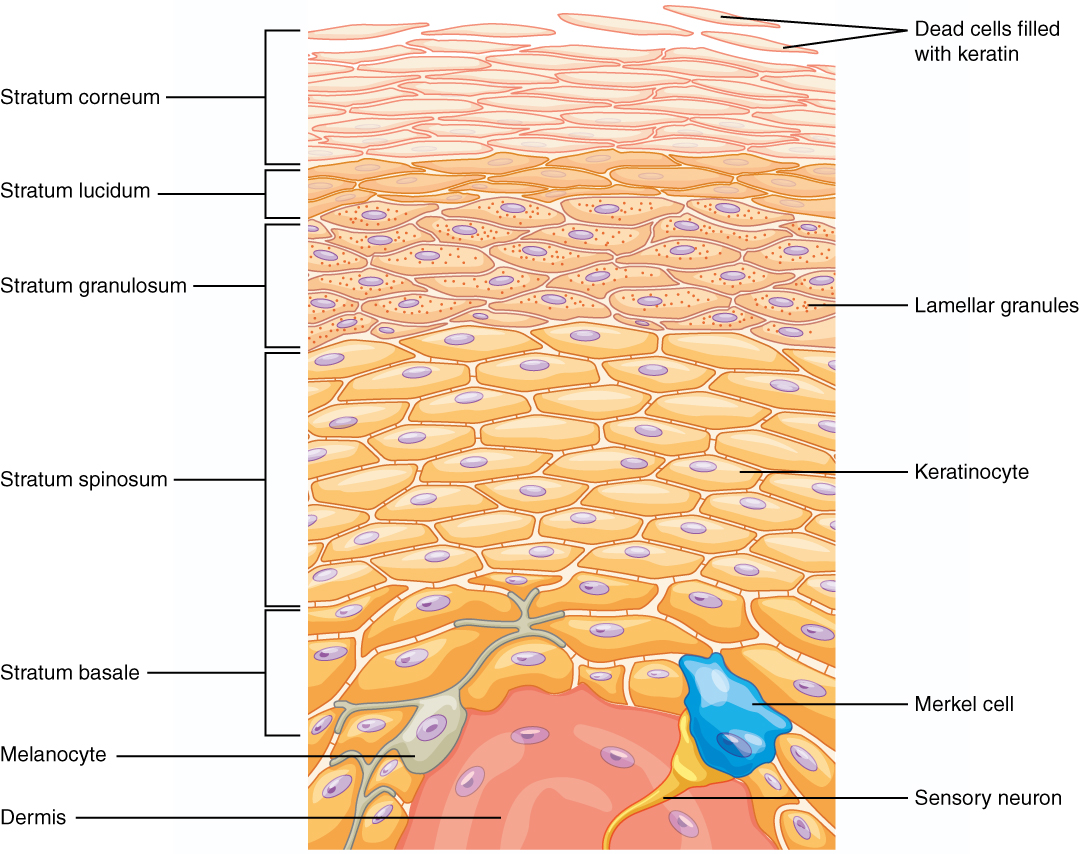
- Merkel cells (shown in blue) are located in the basal epidermal layer of the skin.

Details
- Location: Skin of vertebrates
- Function: Light touch sensation

Identifiers
- MeSH: D018862
- NeuroLex ID: nifext_87

Merkel cells, also known as Merkel–Ranvier cells or tactile epithelial cells, are oval-shaped mechanoreceptors essential for light touch sensation and found in the skin of vertebrates. They are abundant in highly sensitive skin like that of the fingertips in humans, and make synaptic contacts with somatosensory afferent nerve fibers. It has been reported that Merkel cells are derived from neural crest cells, though more recent experiments in mammals have indicated that they are epithelial in origin.

Merkel cells functionally resemble the enterochromaffin cell, the mechanosensory cell of the gastrointestinal epithelium.

== Structure ==
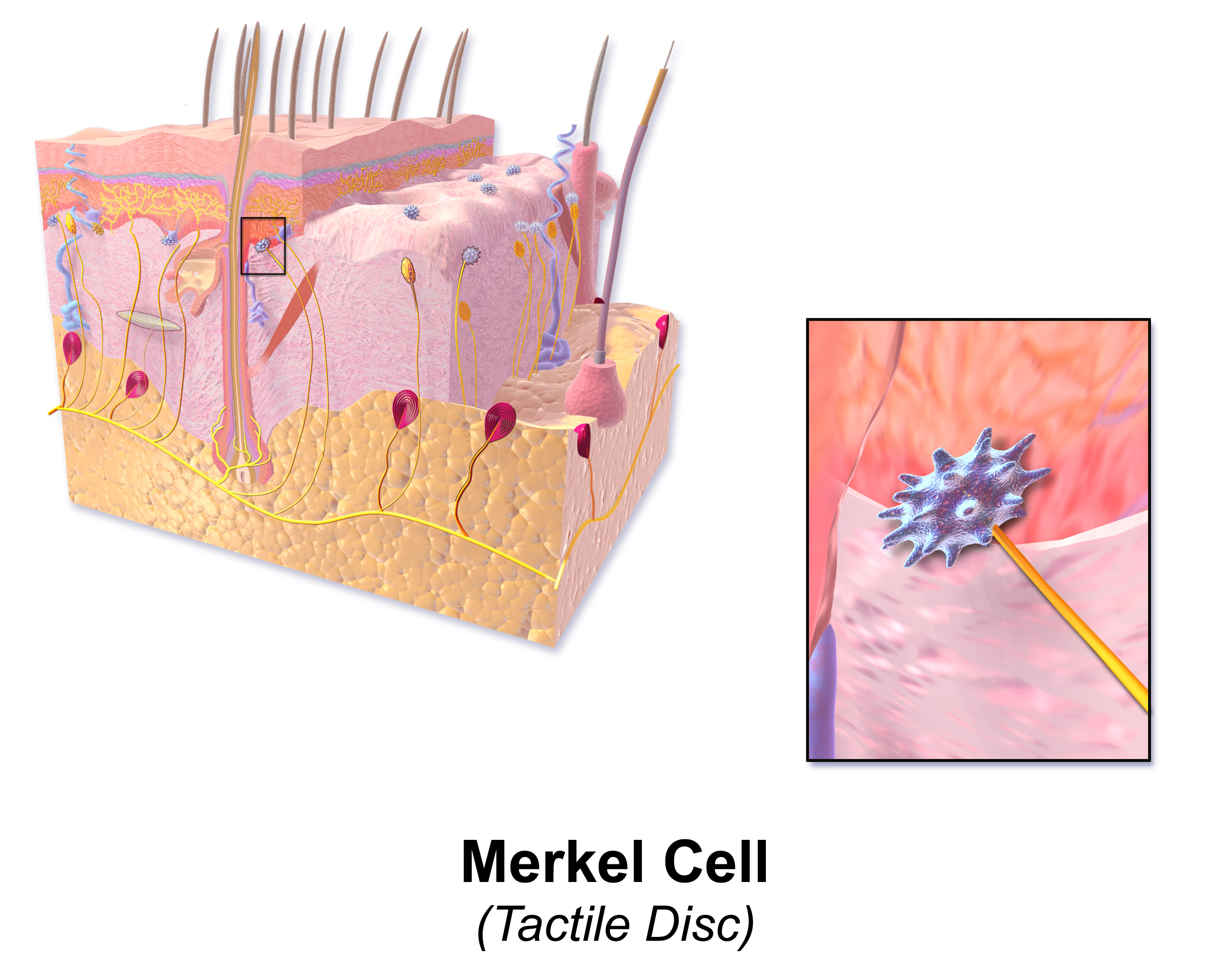
Merkel cell.

Merkel cells are found in the skin and some parts of the mucosa of all vertebrates. In mammalian skin, they are clear cells found in the stratum basale (at the bottom of sweat duct ridges) of the epidermis approximately 10 μm in diameter. They are oval-shaped mechanoreceptors essential for light touch sensation and found in the skin of vertebrates. They are abundant in highly sensitive skin like that of the fingertips in humans, and make synaptic contacts with somatosensory afferent nerve fibers. They also occur in epidermal invaginations of the plantar foot surface called rete ridges.

Most often, they are associated with sensory nerve endings, when they are known as Merkel nerve endings (also called a Merkel cell-neurite complex). They are associated with slowly adapting (SA1) somatosensory nerve fibers. They react to low vibrations (5–15 Hz) and deep static touch such as shapes and edges. Due to a small receptive field (extremely detailed info) they are densely present in areas like fingertips; they are not covered (shelled) and thus respond to pressures over long periods.

=== Developmental ===
The origin of Merkel cells has been debated for over 20 years. Evidence from skin graft experiments in birds implies that they are neural crest derived, but experiments in mammals now demonstrate an epidermal origin.

== Function ==
The German anatomist Friedrich Sigmund Merkel referred to Merkel cells as Tastzellen or "touch cells". Until recently this proposed function was controversial and hard to prove, due to the close physical association of Merkel cells with sensory nerve endings. However, recent work in mice and other model organisms demonstrates that Merkel cells intrinsically transform touch into electrical signals that are transmitted to the nervous system. Merkel cells express PIEZO2, a mechanosensitive ion channel that responds to mechanical forces. Mice in which Piezo2 is knocked-out specifically in skin cells, but not sensory neurons, show decreased behavioral responses to gentle touch.

Merkel cells are sometimes considered APUD cells (an older definition, more commonly classified as a part of dispersed neuroendocrine system) because they contain dense core granules, and thus may also have a neuroendocrine function.

== Susceptibility to malignancy ==
Although uncommon, these cells may become malignant and form a Merkel cell carcinoma—an aggressive and difficult to treat skin cancer.

== See also ==
- Merkel nerve ending
- Merkel cell carcinoma
- List of keratins expressed in the human integumentary system
- List of human cell types derived from the germ layers
- List of distinct cell types in the adult human body
