= Abrasion (medicine) =

Partial thickness wound caused by damage to the skin

Abrasion (medical)
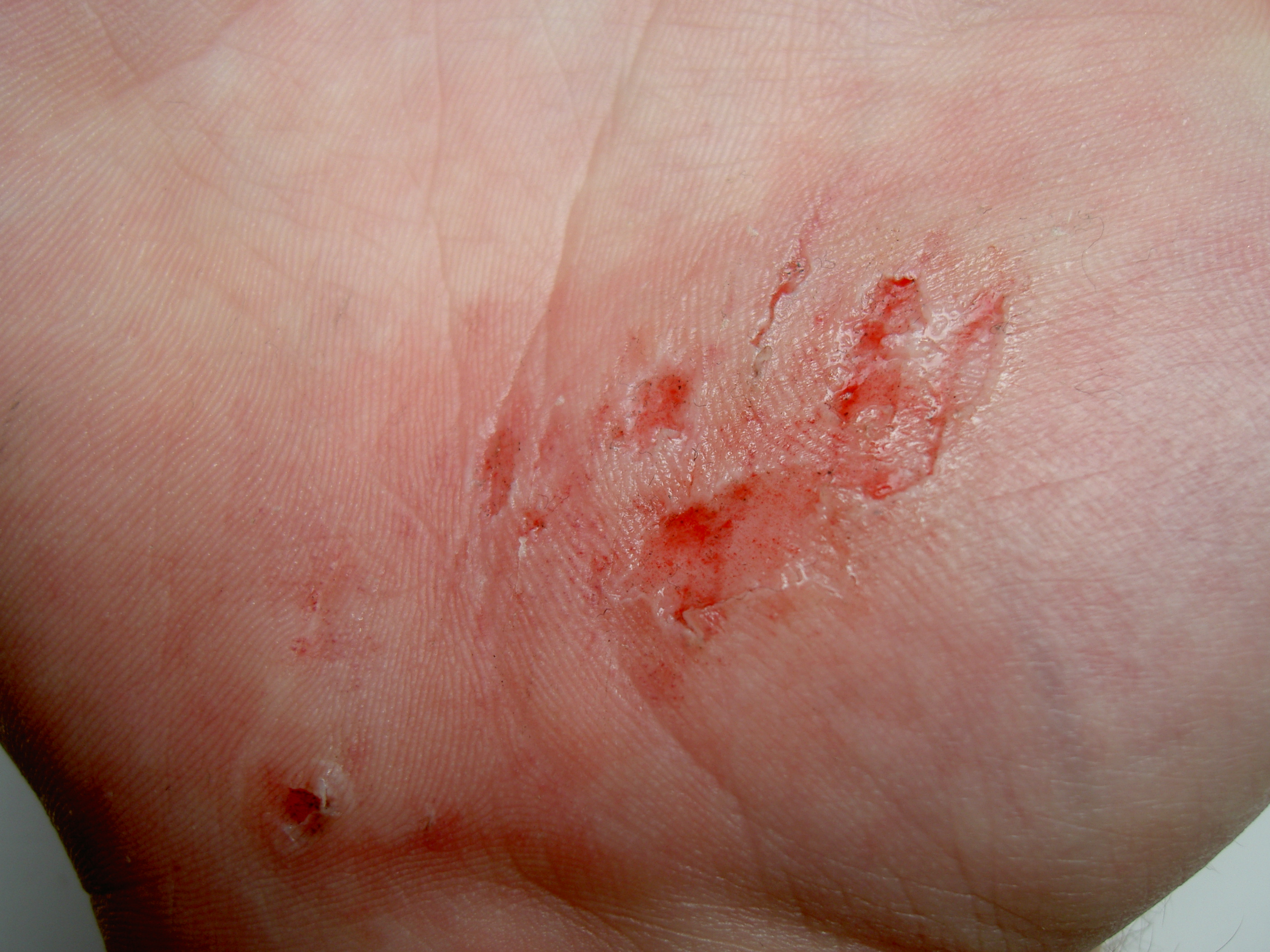
- Abrasion on the palm of a right hand, shortly after falling
- Specialty: Emergency medicine

An abrasion is a partial thickness wound caused by damage to the skin. It can be superficial, which involves only the epidermis, or deep, which involves the deep dermis. Abrasions usually involve minimal bleeding. Mild abrasions, also known as grazes or scrapes, do not scar or bleed because the dermis is left intact, but deep abrasions that disrupt the normal dermal structures may lead to the formation of scar tissue. A more traumatic abrasion that removes all layers of skin is called an avulsion.

Abrasion injuries most commonly occur when exposed skin comes into moving contact with a rough surface, causing a grinding or rubbing away of the upper layers of the epidermis.

== By degree ==
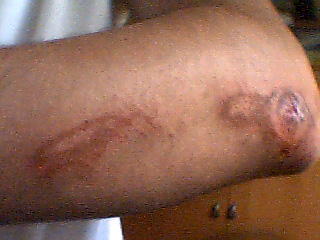
Abrasions on elbow and lower arm. The elbow wound will produce a permanent scar.

- A first-degree abrasion involves only epidermal injury.
- A second-degree abrasion involves the epidermis as well as the dermis and may bleed slightly.
- A third-degree abrasion involves damage to the subcutaneous layer and the skin and is often called an avulsion.

== Treatment ==
The abrasion should be cleaned and any debris removed. A topical antibiotic (such as neomycin or bacitracin) should be applied to prevent infection and to keep the wound moist. Dressing the wound is beneficial because it helps keep the wound from drying out, providing a moist environment conducive for healing. If the abrasion is painful, a topical analgesic (such as lidocaine or benzocaine) can be applied, but for large abrasions, a systemic analgesic may be necessary. Avoid exposing abraded skin to the sun as permanent hyperpigmentation can develop.

== Healing ==
The gallery below shows the healing process for an abrasion on the palm caused by sliding on concrete.

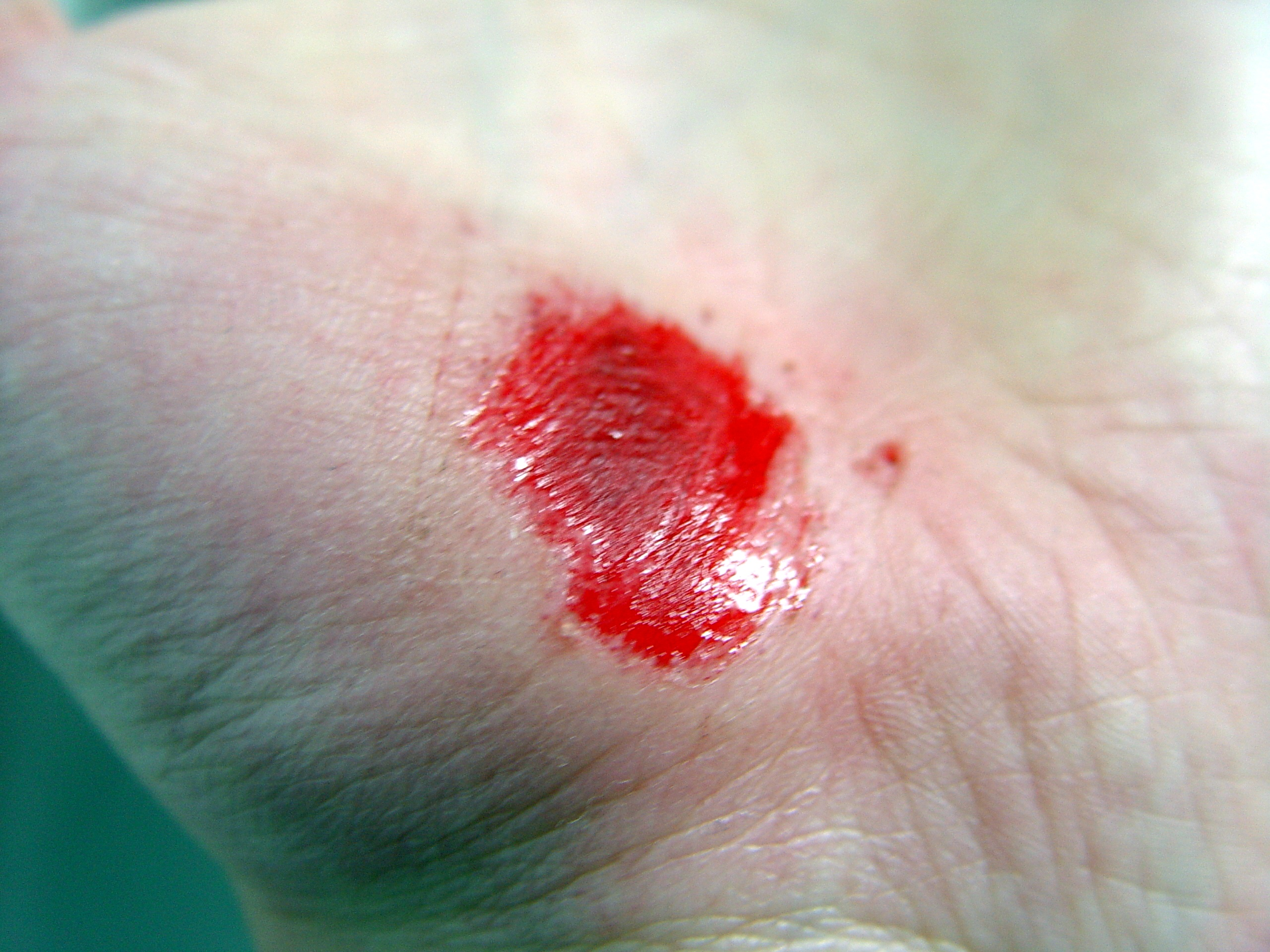
32 minutes after injury

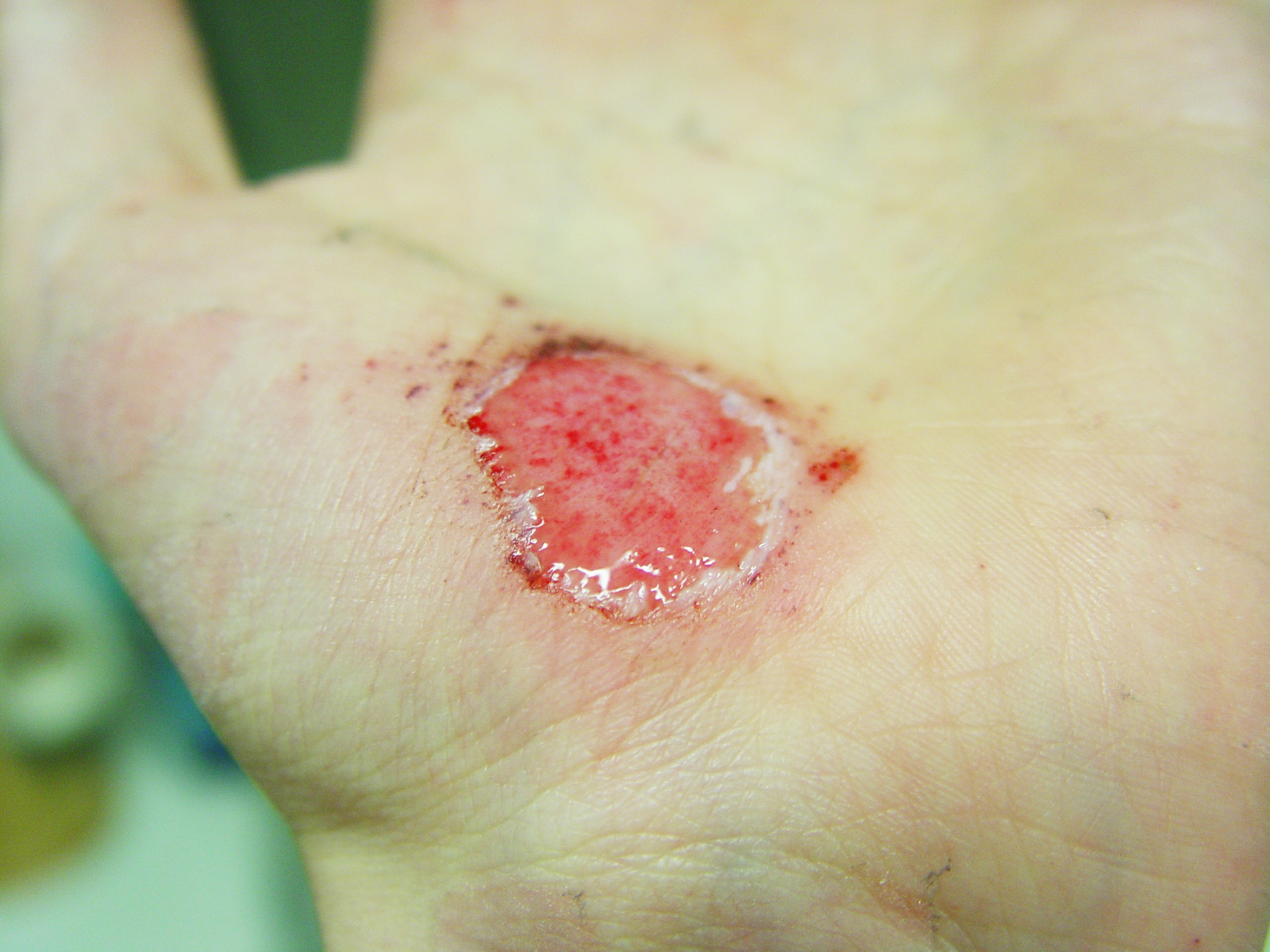
17 hours after injury

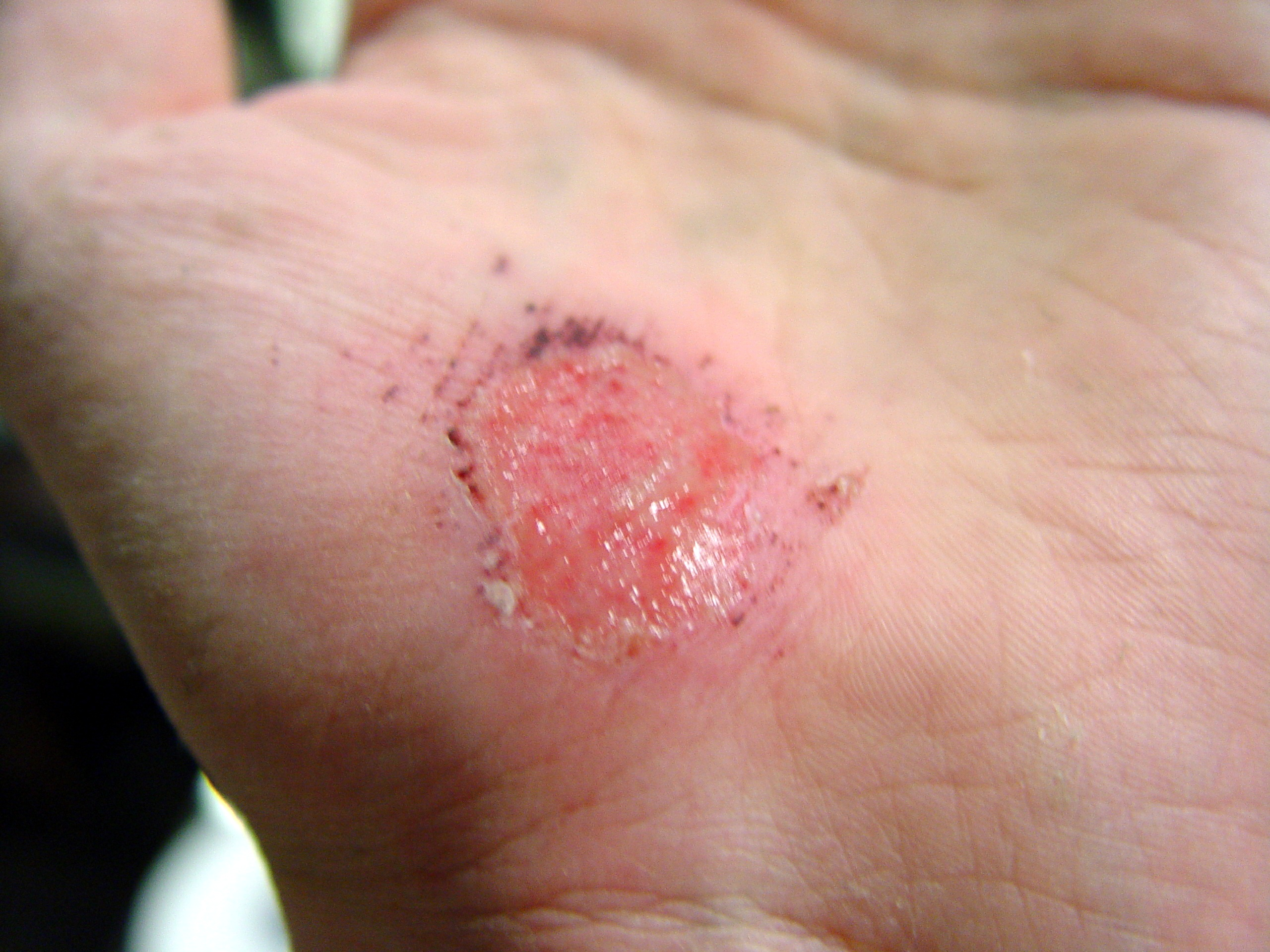
43 hours after injury

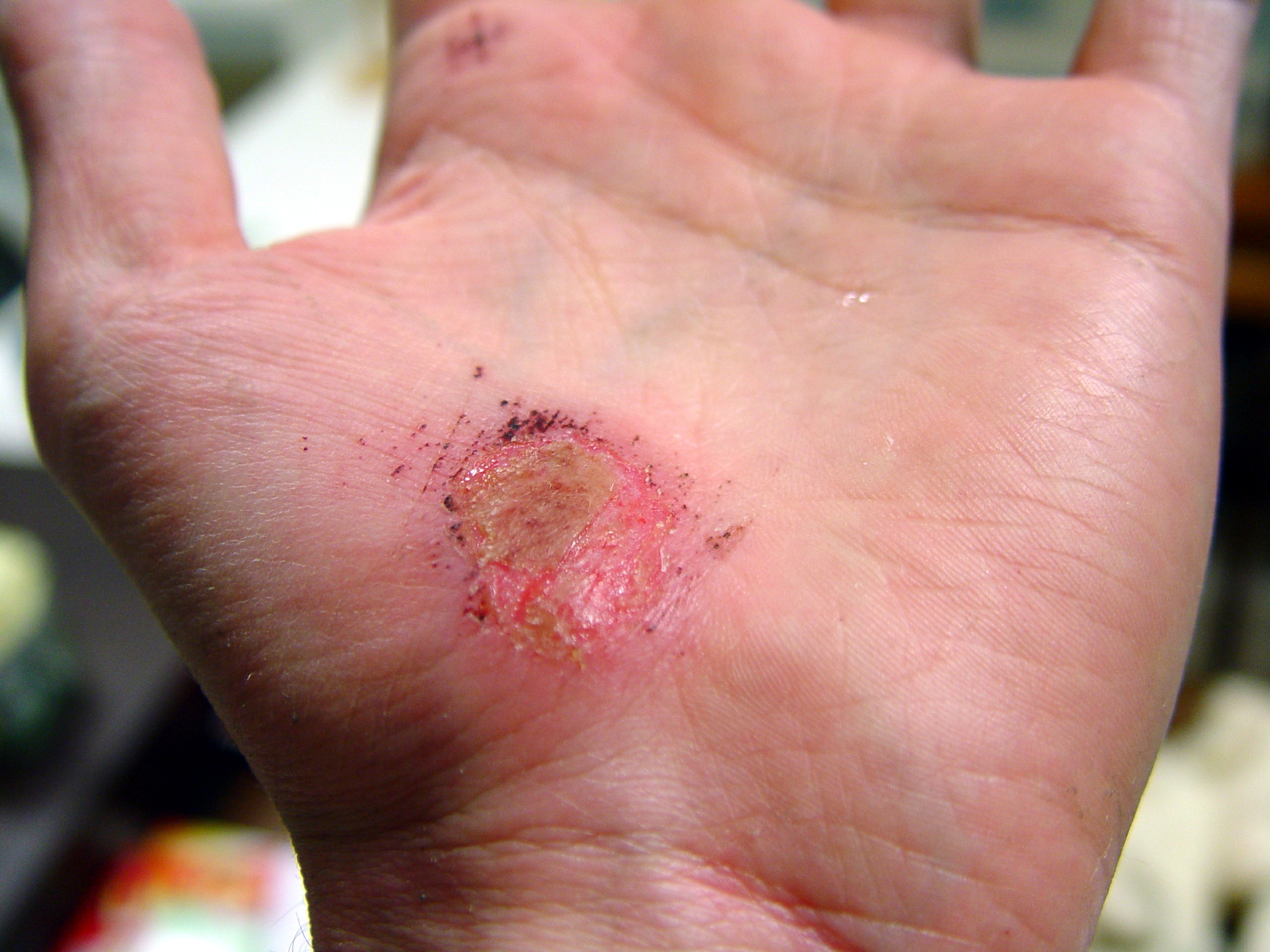
3 days after injury

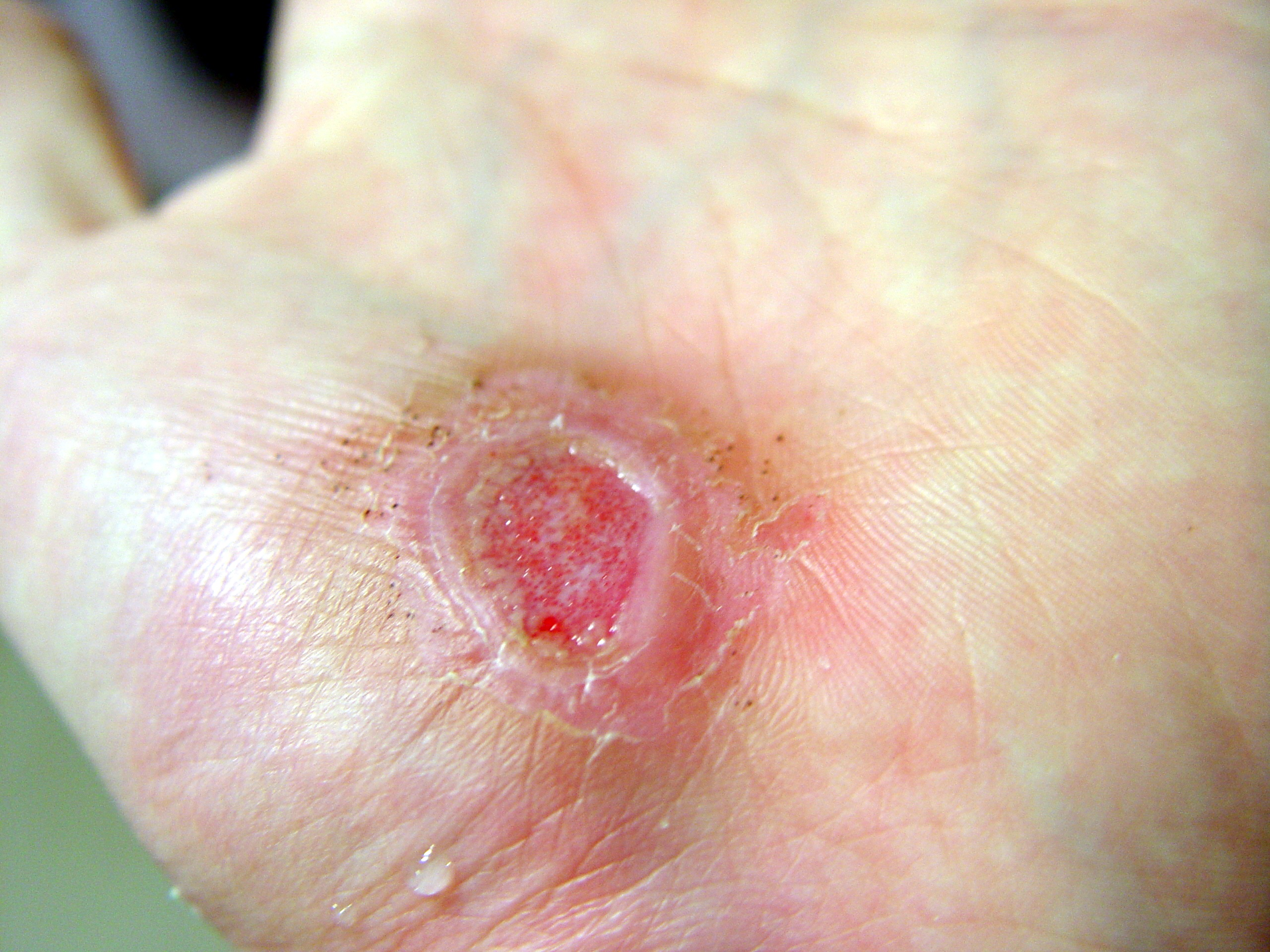
13 days after injury

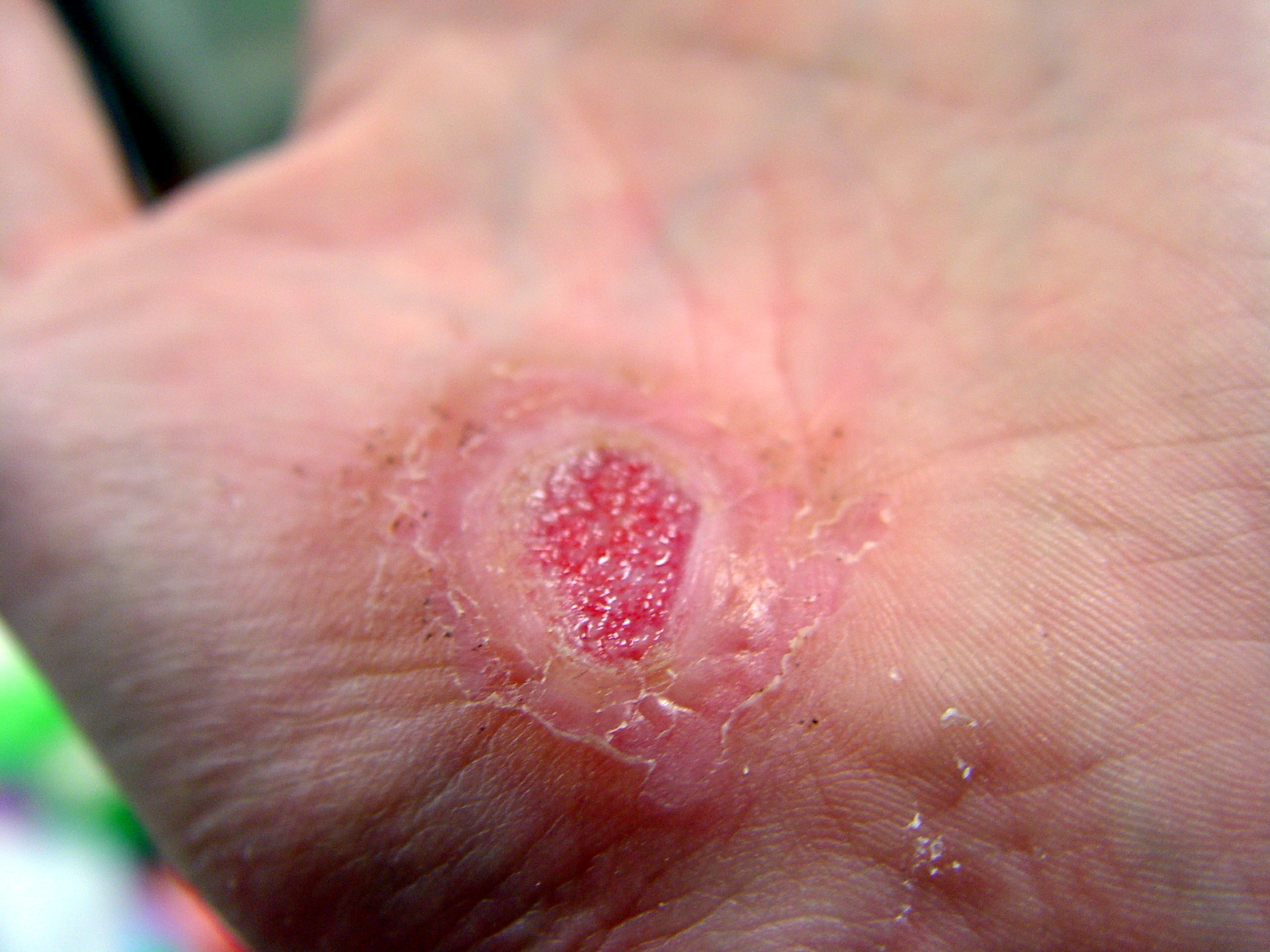
14 days after injury

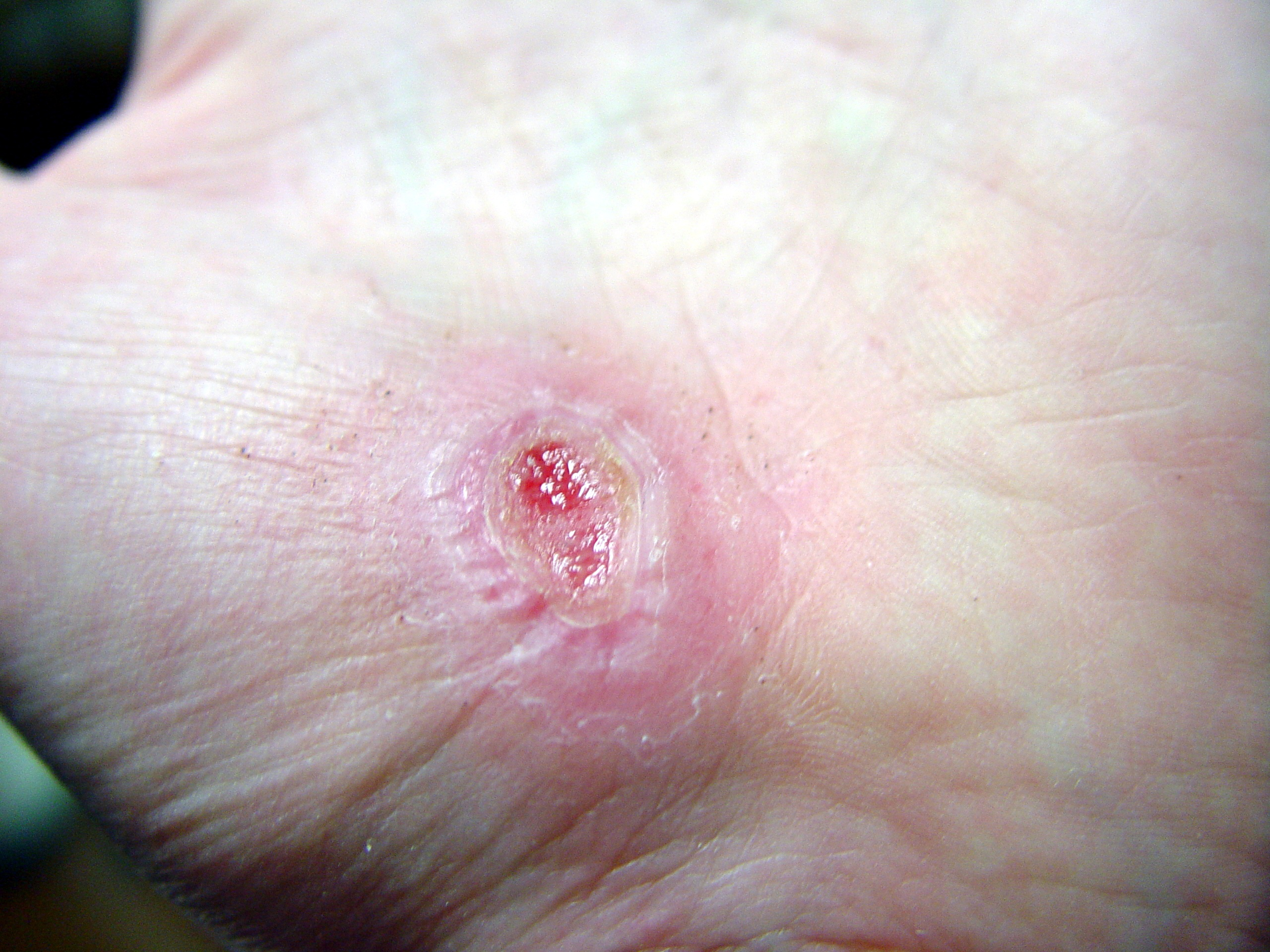
17 days after injury

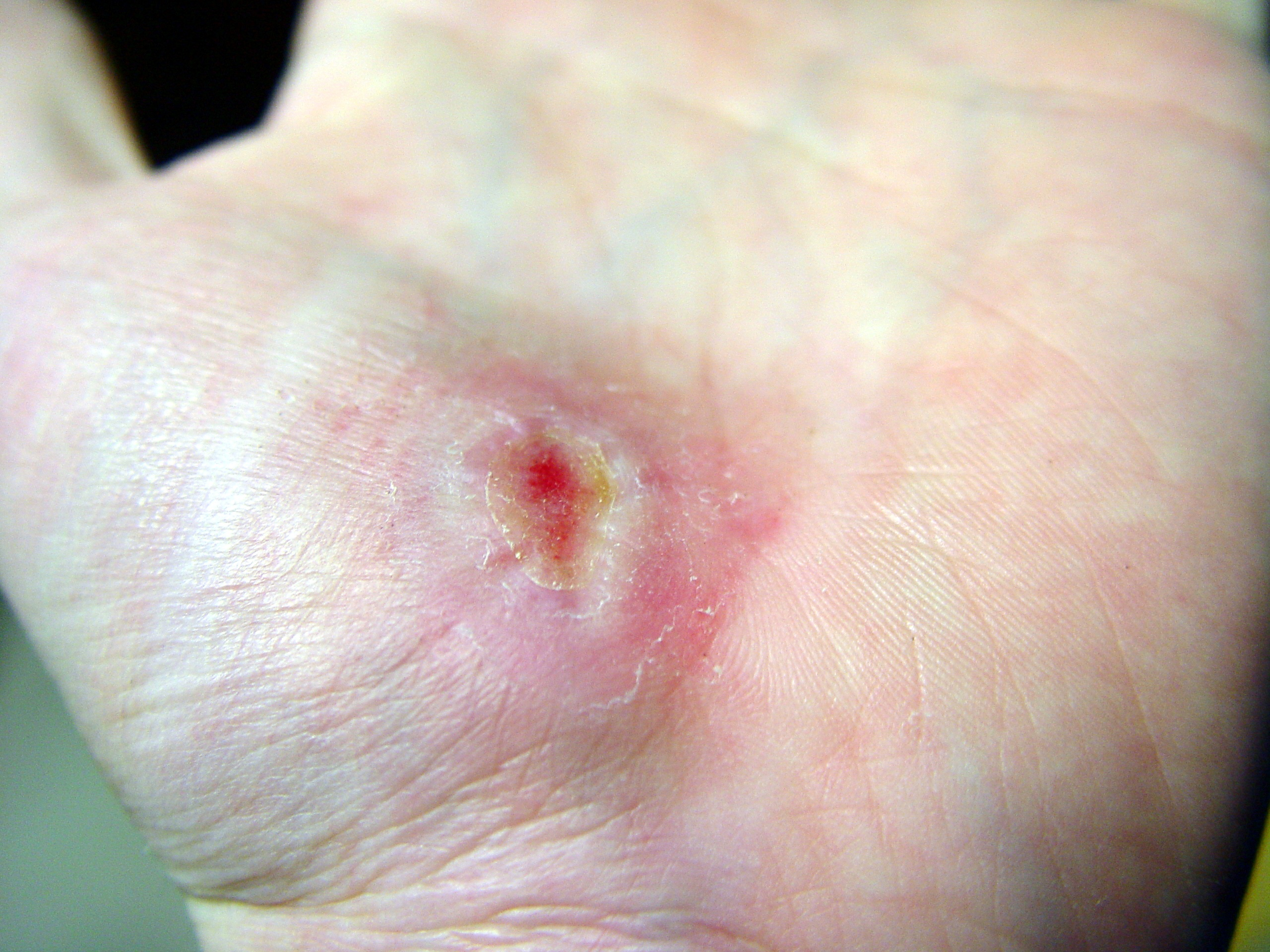
18 days after injury

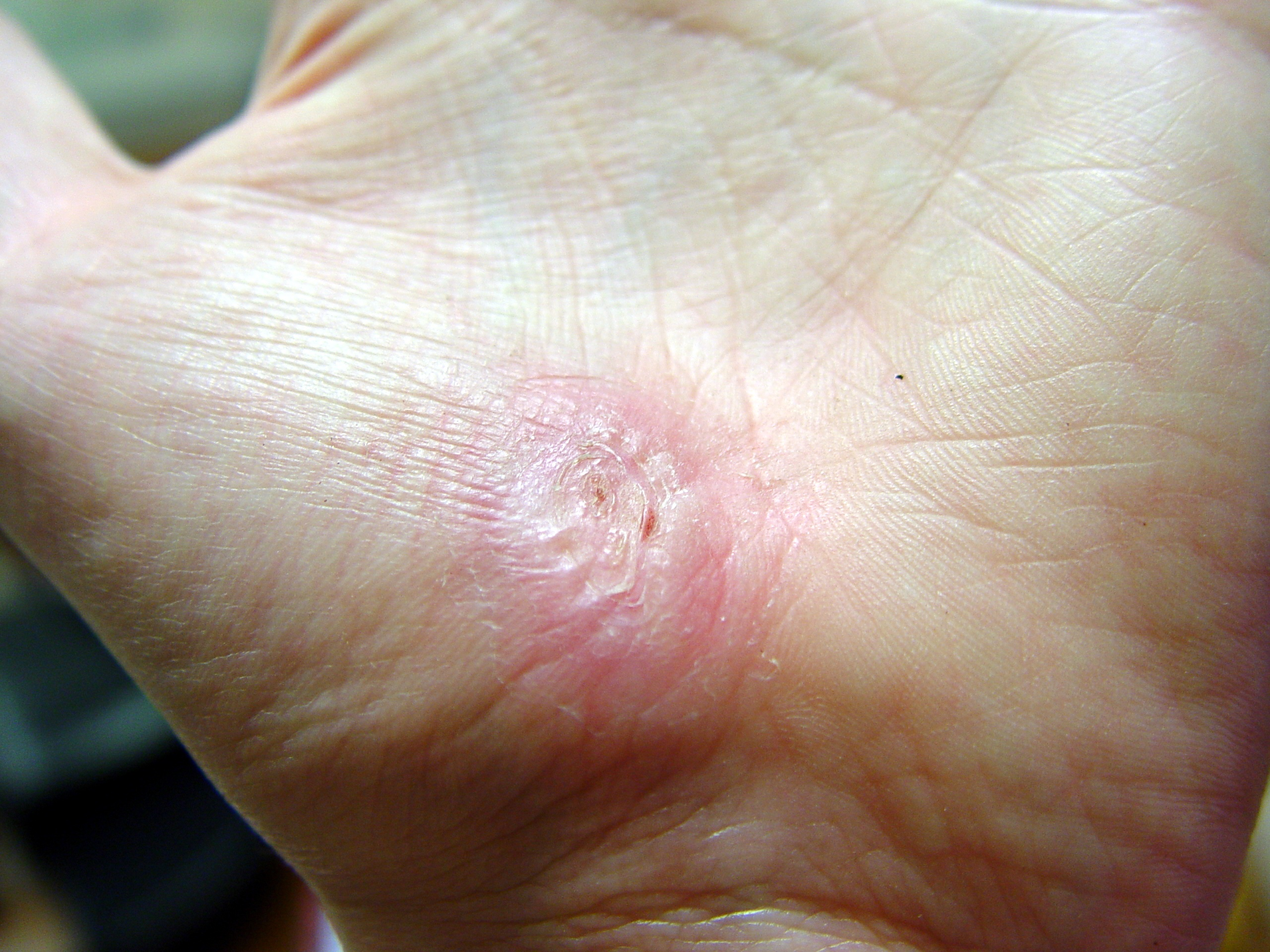
22 days after injury

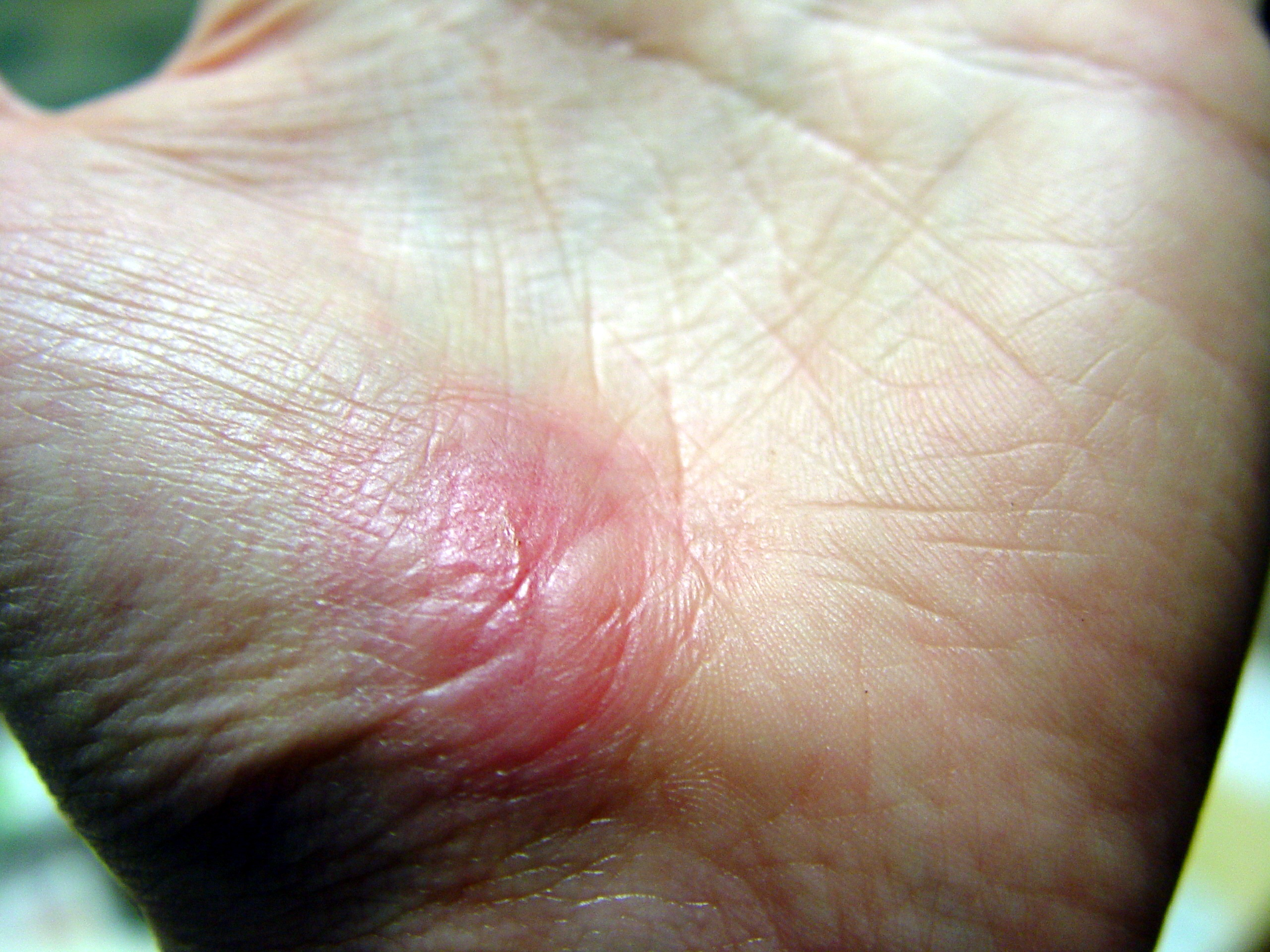
30 days after injury

== See also ==
- Chafing (skin)
- List of cutaneous conditions
- Contusion
- Laceration
