= Stratum spinosum =

Layer of the epidermis

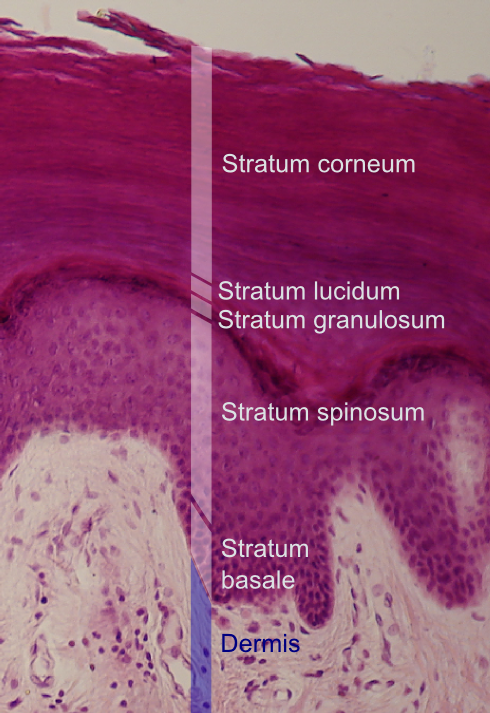
Histologic image showing a section of epidermis. Stratum spinosum labeled slightly below center.

The stratum spinosum (or spinous layer/prickle cell layer) is a layer of the epidermis found between the stratum granulosum and stratum basale. This layer is composed of polyhedral keratinocytes. These are joined with desmosomes. Their spiny (Latin, spinosum) appearance is due to shrinking of the microfilaments between desmosomes that occurs when stained with H&E. Keratinization begins in the stratum spinosum, although the actual keratinocytes begin in the stratum basale. They have large pale-staining nuclei as they are active in synthesizing fibrillar proteins, known as cytokeratin, which build up within the cells aggregating together forming tonofibrils. The tonofibrils go on to form the desmosomes, which allow for strong connections to form between adjacent keratinocytes. The stratum spinosum also contains Langerhans cells, which functions as a macrophage by engulfing bacteria, foreign particles, and damaged cells that occur in this layer.

== Clinical significance ==
Diffuse hyperplasia of the stratum spinosum is termed acanthosis.

== Additional images ==
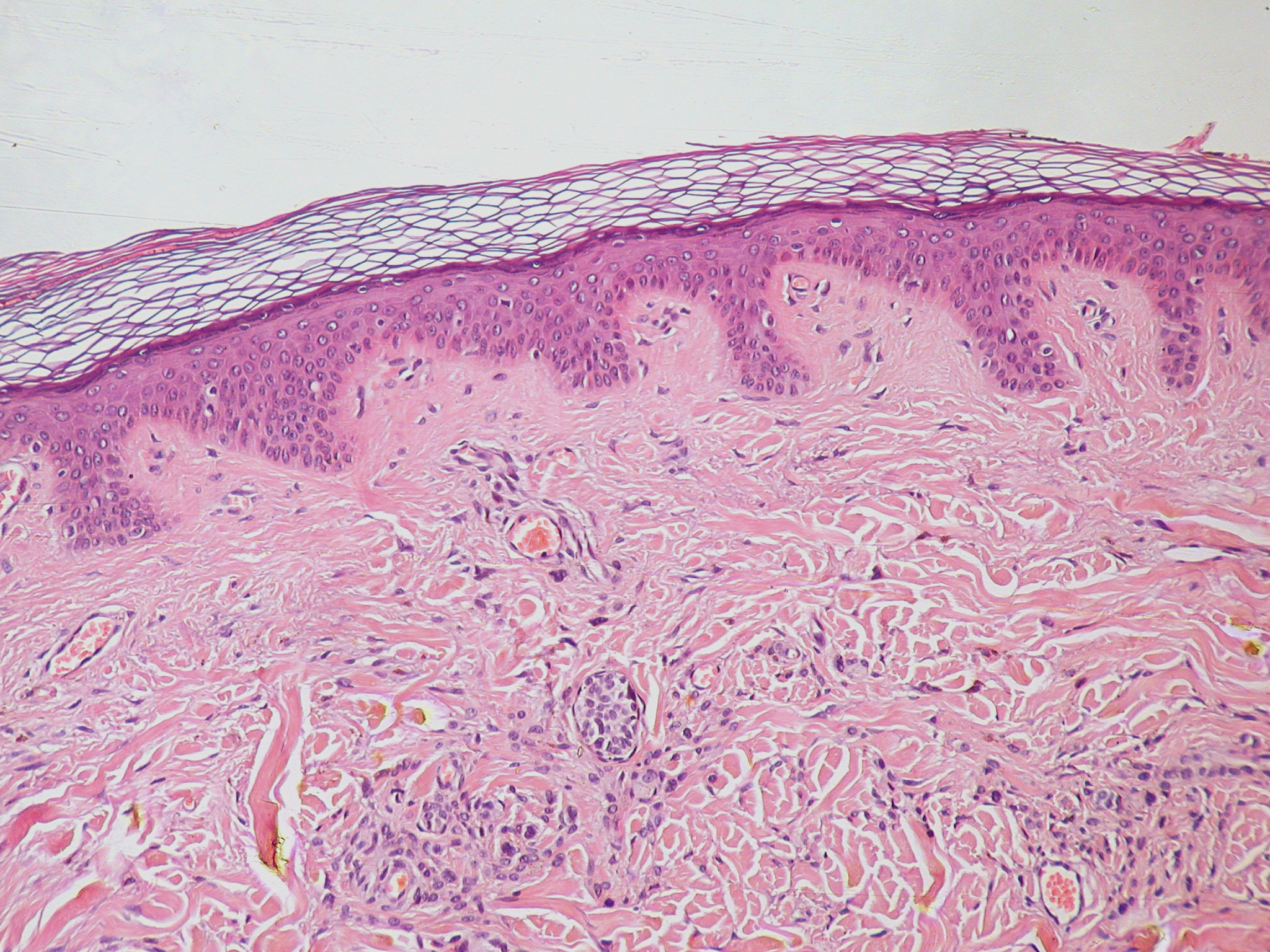
Epidermis and dermis of human skin

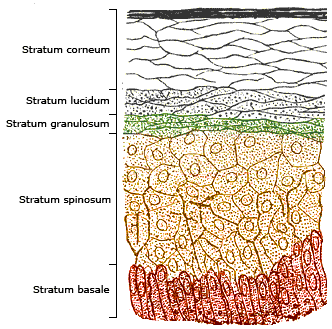
Section of epidermis

== See also ==
- Spinous cell
