= Stratum basale =

Deepest layer of the five layers of the epidermis

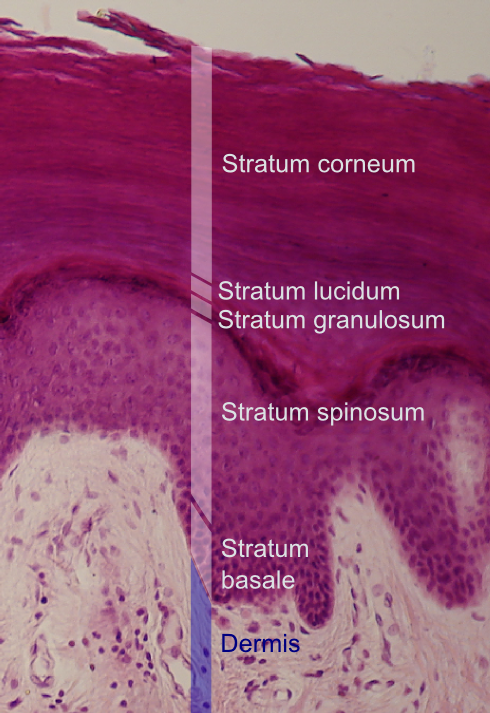
Histologic image showing a section of epidermis. Stratum basale labeled near bottom.

The stratum basale (basal layer, sometimes referred to as stratum germinativum) is the deepest layer of the five layers of the epidermis, the external covering of skin in mammals.

The stratum basale is a single layer of columnar or cuboidal basal cells. The cells are attached to each other and to the overlying stratum spinosum cells by desmosomes and hemidesmosomes. The nucleus is large, ovoid and occupies most of the cell. Some basal cells can act like stem cells with the ability to divide and produce new cells, and these are sometimes called basal keratinocyte stem cells. Others serve to anchor the epidermis glabrous skin (hairless), and hyper-proliferative epidermis (from a skin disease).

They divide to form the keratinocytes of the stratum spinosum, which migrate superficially. Other types of cells found within the stratum basale are melanocytes (pigment-producing cells) and Merkel cells (touch receptors).

== Clinical significance ==
Basal-cell carcinomas (basal-cell cancers), account for around 80 per cent of all skin cancers. Not all basal-cell cancers originate in the basal cells but they are so named because the cancer cells resemble basal cells when seen under a microscope.

In a growing fetus, fingerprints form where the cells of the stratum basale meet the papillae of the underlying papillary layer of the dermis, resulting in the formation of the ridges on the fingers. Fingerprints are unique to each individual and are used for forensic analyses because the patterns do not change with the growth and aging processes.

== Additional images ==
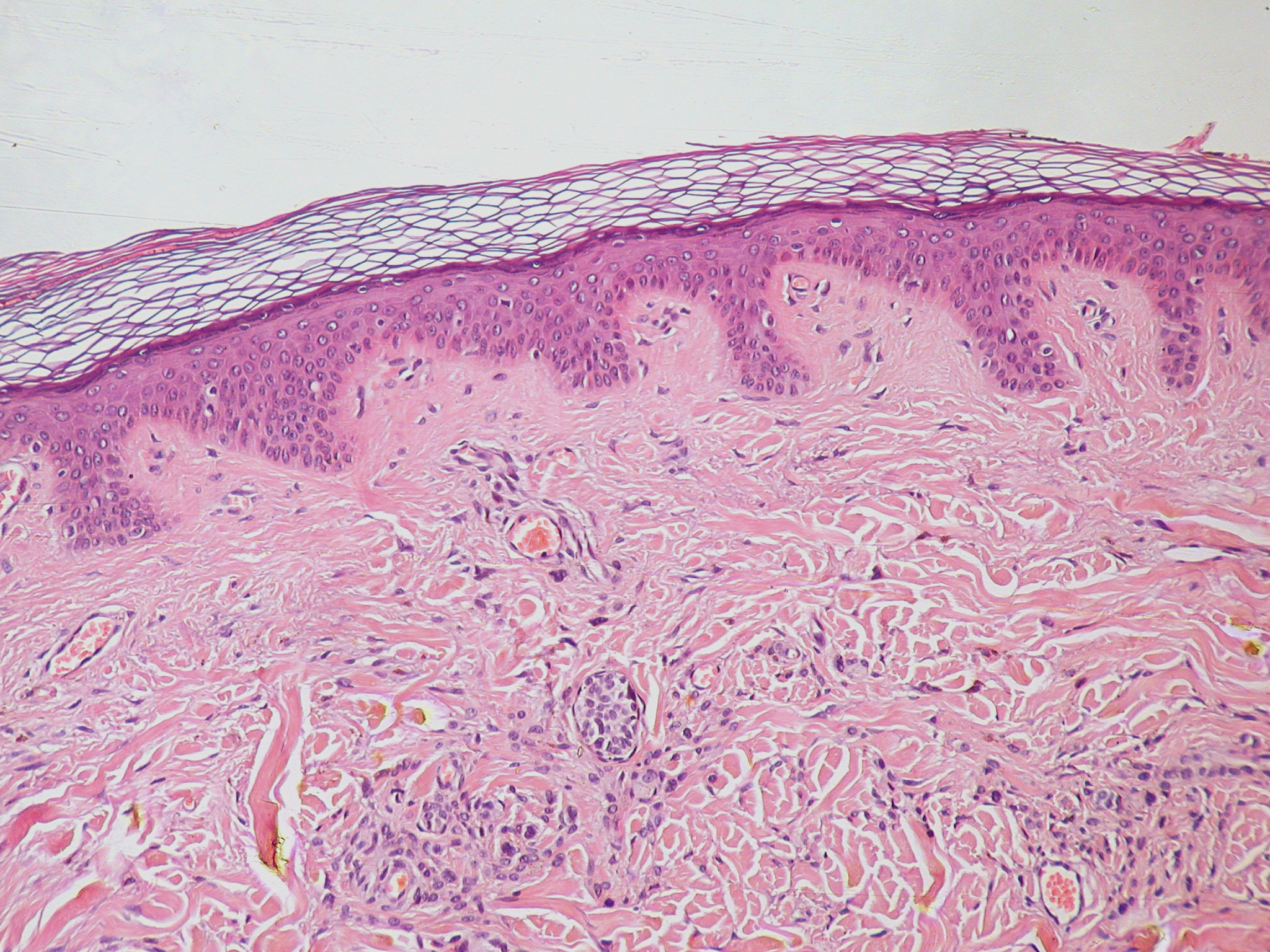
Epidermis and dermis of human skin

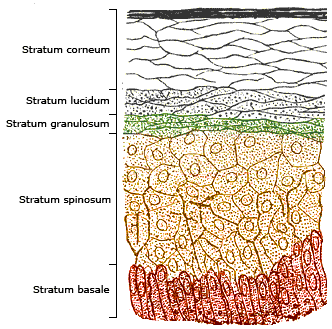
Section of epidermis

== See also ==
- List of keratins expressed in the human integumentary system
