= Skin test =

Diagnostic test

A skin test is a medical test in which a substance is injected into the skin.

== Examples ==
- Casoni test
- Corneometry
- Dick test
- Fernandez reaction
- Frei test
- Hair perforation test
- Kveim test
- Leishmanin skin test
- Lepromin
- Patch test
- Schick test
- Skin allergy test
- Sweat diagnostics
- Sweat test
- Tine test
- Transepidermal water loss
- Trichoscopy
