= Placenta-specific protein 1 =

Protein-coding gene in the species Homo sapiens

PLAC1

Identifiers
- Aliases: PLAC1, CT92, OOSP2L, placenta specific 1, OOSP2B, placenta enriched 1
- External IDs: OMIM: 300296; MGI: 1926287; GeneCards: PLAC1

Gene location (Human)
Chr.	X chromosome (human)
Band	Xq26.3	Start	134,565,838 bp
Band	Xq26.3	End	134,764,322 bp

Gene location (Mouse)
Chr.	X chromosome (mouse)
Band	X A5|X 29.31 cM	Start	52,158,872 bp
Band	X A5|X 29.31 cM	End	52,328,988 bp
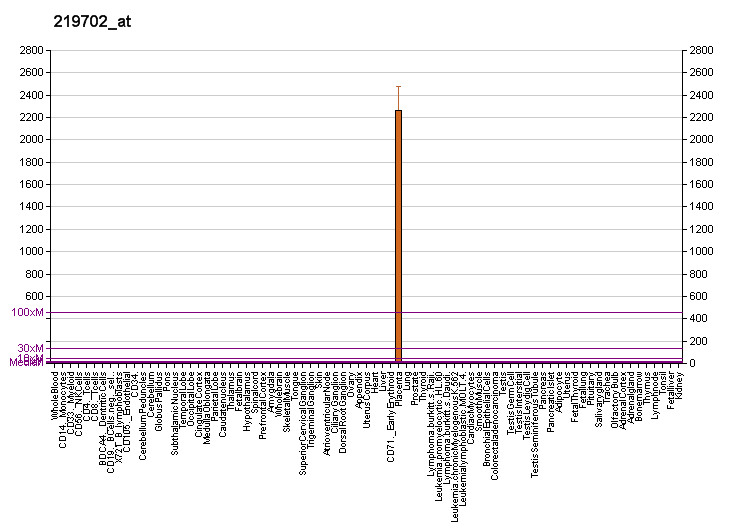
RNA expression pattern
Bgee	Human / Mouse (ortholog); Top expressed in: placenta; oocyte; testicle; secondary oocyte; cartilage tissue; gonad; stromal cell of endometrium; right testis; left testis; metanephros / Top expressed in: yolk sac; decidua; endocardial cushion; embryo; body wall; blastocyst; embryo; abdominal wall; primitive streak; morula; More reference expression data
BioGPS	More reference expression data
Gene ontology
Molecular function	molecular function
Cellular component	extracellular region; cellular component
Biological process	multicellular organism development; placenta development
Sources:Amigo / QuickGO
Orthologs
Databases	NCBI: entry; OMA: entry
Species	Human	Mouse
Entrez	10761	56096
Ensembl	ENSG00000170965	ENSMUSG00000061082
UniProt	Q9HBJ0	Q9JI83
RefSeq (mRNA)	NM_021796; NM_001316887; NM_001316888; NM_001316889	NM_019538; NM_001357802
RefSeq (protein)	NP_001303816; NP_001303817; NP_001303818; NP_068568	NP_062411; NP_001344731
Location (UCSC)	Chr X: 134.57 – 134.76 Mb	Chr X: 52.16 – 52.33 Mb
PubMed search
- Wikidata
View/Edit Human	View/Edit Mouse

Placenta-specific protein 1 is a small (212 amino acid), secreted cell surface protein encoded on the X-chromosome by the PLAC1 gene. Since its discovery in 1999, PLAC1 has been found to play a role in placental development and maintenance, several gestational disorders including preeclampsia, fetal development and a large number of cancers.

== Genomics ==
PLAC1 is located on the long arm of the X-chromosome at Xq26.3. The gene consists of six exons spanning nearly 200Kb (GRCh38/hgs38; X:134,565,838 - 134,764,322). The entire coding sequence plus the 3' UTR and part of the 5' UTR constitute exon 6 while exons 1 – 5 contain variously spliced elements of the rest of the 5'UTR including two independently regulated promoters.

These two promoters, termed P1 (or distal) and P2 (or proximal) are located in exons 1 and 4 respectively. They have been shown to produce transcripts simultaneously though P1 transcription predominates in cancers and P2 transcription predominates in placentae.

== Phylogenetics ==
From its initial description, the consensus is that PLAC1 is highly conserved and that this conservation reflects an important role in the establishment and maintenance of the placenta. A detailed study of the PLAC1 gene and protein among 54 placental mammal species representing twelve crown orders confirms a high level of conservation under the control of strict purifying selection.

== Function ==
Discovery of PLAC1 resulted from an examination of the region around the human hypoxanthine ribosyltransferase 1 (HPRT) gene aimed at determining whether or not a placenta-specific protein was encoded there. This question was raised because the region was believed to be involved in both placental and fetal pathologies. Once identified, PLAC1 and its mouse ortholog Plac1 were found to be expressed throughout gestation. It was quickly established that PLAC1 expression is specific to trophoblast cells and that it is a critical element in establishing and maintaining a normal placenta. Expression was further localised to the apical region of the syncytiotrophoblast, the leading, invasive part of the developing embryo. PLAC1 expression terminates at the onset of labor and PLAC1 mRNAs clear the peripheral maternal circulatory system soon after delivery.

The PLAC1 gene is protein-coding and involved in the development of the placenta from trophoblast cells. This gene is specifically found on the X chromosome in an area that controls placenta development. It has been suggested that large deletions from this area of the X chromosome leads to retardation in the fetal growth process as well as early fetal death. PLAC1 is believed to be a mainly regulatory gene and is expressed the most between the 22nd and 40th week of pregnancy in humans. The knockout model generated for the PLAC1 gene suggested that mice were infertile when PLAC1 was inactivated or died late in gestation or shortly after birth, indicating that PLAC1 is a significant gene that greatly contributes to the viability of an organism. The molecular basis for the impact of PLAC1 is unknown, although it is clear the absence of this gene results in infertile or inviable offspring.

Recognition that PLAC1 plays an important role in first establishing the placenta and, subsequently, in maintaining it throughout gestation leads to the idea that PLAC1 may play a role in gestational issues from infertility to premature birth. An important contribution to this idea is the observation that a Plac1 knockout mouse model exhibited both placentomegaly in the dams and growth restriction in the pups. Numerous human gestational issues have been associated with abnormal PLAC1 expression including intrauterine growth restriction (IUGR), premature birth, implantation failure, and preeclampsia. Several of these studies have sought to develop PLAC1 assays into diagnostic tools with mixed success.

== Cancer ==
While it has been clearly established that PLAC1 is truly placenta-specific, almost from the outset it was also clear that PLAC1 is co-opted in human cancers. The first evidence that PLAC1 is co-opted in cancer was published in 2006. Since then, PLAC1 expression has been demonstrated in more than a dozen human cancers and in at least one hundred human cancer cell lines. Among the cancers in which PLAC1 expression is evident are gastric cancers, colon/colorectal cancers, liver cancers, pancreatic cancers, lung cancers, and breast cancers. In nearly all cases, PLAC1 expression is associated with poor clinical outcomes. Nowhere is this more true than in cancers of the male and female reproductive tract. That is, prostate cancer, uterine cancer, ovarian cancer and cervical cancer all have demonstrated a positive correlation between PLAC1 expression and prognosis.

In 2005, PLAC1 expression in differentiating fibroblasts was shown to be regulated by fibroblast growth factor 7 (FGF7). This regulatory relationship has since been shown to be central to Akt Serine/Threonine kinase 1-mediated cancer cell proliferation. PLAC1 forms a cell surface complex with FGF7 and the FGFR2IIIb receptor which then activates a cascade leading to Akt phosphorylation. Expression of PLAC1is, in turn, partially determined by the p53 tumor suppressor. PLAC1 expression is suppressed by wild-type p53 but increases in the presence of mutated or absent p53.

== Immunotherapy ==
PLAC1 is classified as a "cancer-testis antigen" as it is preferentially expressed in trophoblasts and tumors. In addition to results associating PLAC1 expression with risk of various cancers as well as with prognosis, the ability of PLAC1 to elicit an immune response suggests that its specificity could be harnessed therapeutically. One group in particular is pioneering the potential. Using anti-PLAC1/drug conjugates they have shown that PLAC1-based immunotherapy is highly promising.
