= Epidermis =

Outermost of the three layers that make up the skin

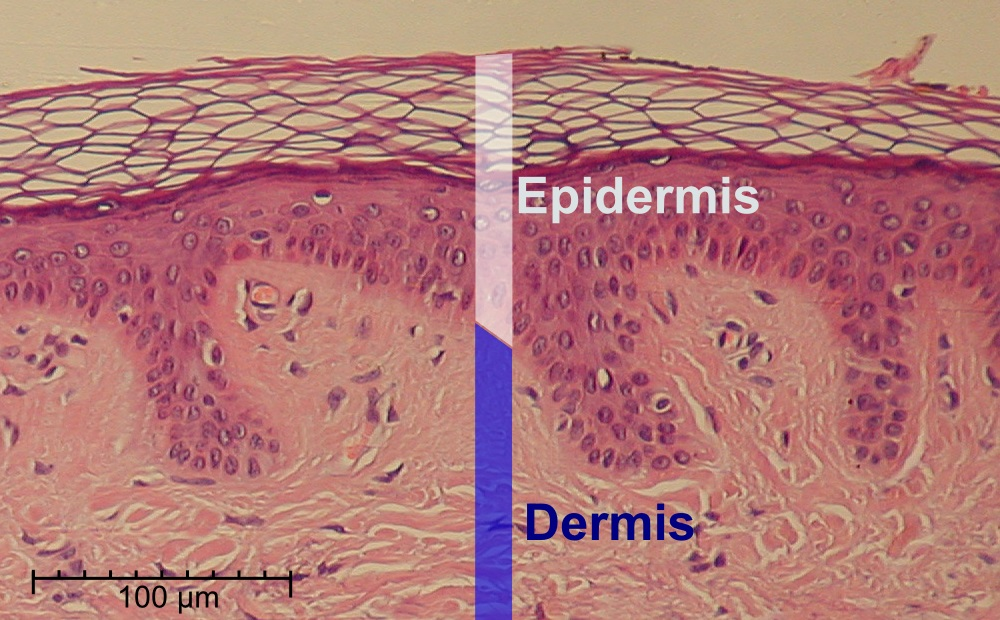
- Microscopic image of the epidermis, which constitutes the outer layer of skin, shown here by the white bar

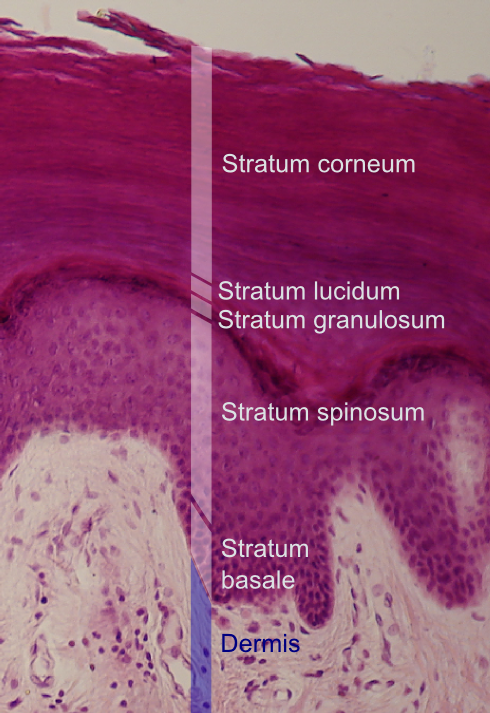
- Microscopic image showing the layers of the epidermis. The stratum corneum appears more compact in this image than above because of different sample preparation.

Details
- Part of: Skin
- System: Integumentary system

Identifiers
- Latin: epidermis
- MeSH: D004817
- TA98: A16.0.00.009
- TA2: 7046
- TH: H3.12.00.1.01001
- FMA: 70596

The epidermis is the outermost of the three major layers that constitute the skin, the inner layers being the dermis and hypodermis. The epidermal layer provides a barrier to infection from environmental pathogens and regulates the amount of water released from the body into the atmosphere through transepidermal water loss.

The epidermis is composed of multiple layers of flattened cells that overlie a base layer (stratum basale) composed of perpendicular columnar cells. The layers of cells develop from stem cells in the basal layer. The thickness of the epidermis varies from 31.2 μm for the penis to 596.6 μm for the sole of the foot with most being roughly 90 μm. Thickness does not vary between the sexes but becomes thinner with age. The human epidermis is an example of epithelium, particularly a stratified squamous epithelium.

The word epidermis is derived through Latin from Ancient Greek epidermis, itself from Ancient Greek epi 'over, upon' and from Ancient Greek derma 'skin'. Something related to or part of the epidermis is termed epidermal.

== Structure ==
=== Cellular components ===
The epidermis primarily consists of keratinocytes (proliferating basal and differentiated suprabasal), which comprise 90% of its cells, but also contains melanocytes, Langerhans cells, Merkel cells, and inflammatory cells. Epidermal thickenings called Rete ridges (or rete pegs) extend downward between dermal papillae. Blood capillaries are found beneath the epidermis, and are linked to an arteriole and a venule. The epidermis itself has no blood supply and is nourished almost exclusively by diffused oxygen from the surrounding air. Cellular mechanisms for regulating water and sodium levels (ENaCs) are found in all layers of the epidermis.

=== Cell boundaries ===
Epidermal cells are tightly interconnected to serve as a tight barrier against the exterior environment. The junctions between the epidermal cells are of the adherens junction type, formed by transmembrane proteins called cadherins. Inside the cell, the cadherins are linked to actin filaments. In immunofluorescence microscopy, the actin filament network appears as a thick border surrounding the cells, although the actin filaments are actually located inside the cell and run parallel to the cell membrane. Because of the proximity of the neighboring cells and tightness of the junctions, the actin immunofluorescence appears as a border between cells.

=== Layers ===
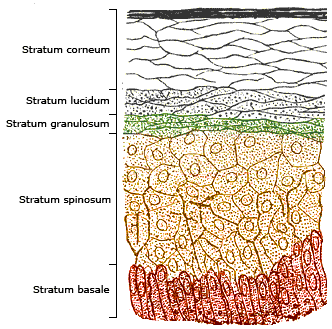
Schematic image showing a section of epidermis, with epidermal layers labeled

The epidermis is composed of four or five layers, depending on the skin region. Those layers from outermost to innermost are:

cornified layer (stratum corneum)

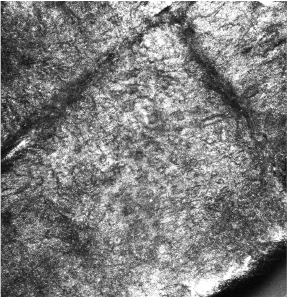
Confocal image of the stratum corneum

This layer is composed of about 15 layers of anucleated corneocytes (the final step of keratinocyte differentiation). They are attached together by corneodesmosomes. These corneocytes have a protein envelope that has now replaced the plasma membrane and are filled with water-retaining keratin proteins. Additionally, they are surrounded in the extracellular space by stacked layers of lipids, which in turn yields a water-retaining barrier. Most of the barrier functions of the epidermis localize to this layer.
clear/translucent layer (stratum lucidum, only in palms and soles)
This narrow layer is found only on the palms and soles. The epidermis of these two areas is known as "thick skin" because with this extra layer, the skin has 5 epidermal layers instead of 4.
granular layer (stratum granulosum)

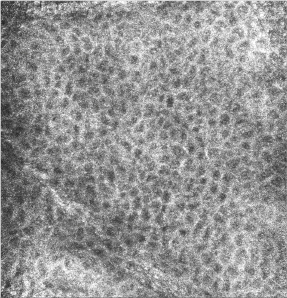
Confocal image of the stratum granulosum

Keratinocytes lose their nuclei and their cytoplasm appears granular. Lipids, contained into those keratinocytes within lamellar bodies, are released into the extracellular space through exocytosis to form a lipid barrier that prevents water loss from the body as well as entry of foreign substances. Those polar lipids are then converted into non-polar lipids and arranged parallel to the cell surface. For example glycosphingolipids become ceramides and phospholipids become free fatty acids.
spinous layer (stratum spinosum)

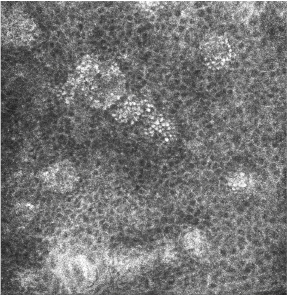
Confocal image of the stratum spinosum already showing some clusters of basal cells

Keratinocytes become connected through desmosomes and produce lamellar bodies, from within the Golgi, enriched in polar lipids, glycosphingolipids, free sterols, phospholipids and catabolic enzymes. Langerhans cells, immunologically active cells, are located in the middle of this layer.
basal/germinal layer (stratum basale/germinativum)

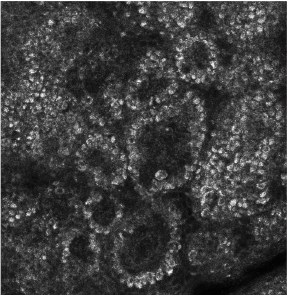
Confocal image of the stratum basale already showing some papillae

Composed mainly of proliferating and non-proliferating keratinocytes, attached to the basement membrane by hemidesmosomes, focal adhesion. Melanocytes are present, connected to numerous keratinocytes in this and other strata through dendrites. Merkel cells are also found in the stratum basale with large numbers in touch-sensitive sites such as the fingertips and lips. They are closely associated with cutaneous nerves and seem to be involved in light touch sensation.
Malpighian layer (stratum malpighii)
This is usually defined as both the stratum basale and stratum spinosum.

The epidermis is separated from the dermis, its underlying tissue, by a basement membrane.

=== Cellular kinetics ===
==== Cell division ====
As a stratified squamous epithelium, the epidermis is maintained by cell division within the stratum basale. Differentiating cells delaminate from the basement membrane and are displaced outward through the epidermal layers, undergoing multiple stages of differentiation until, in the stratum corneum, losing their nucleus and fusing to squamous sheets, which are eventually shed from the surface (desquamation). Differentiated keratinocytes secrete keratin proteins, which contribute to the formation of an extracellular matrix that is an integral part of the skin barrier function. In normal skin, the rate of keratinocyte production equals the rate of loss, taking about two weeks for a cell to journey from the stratum basale to the top of the stratum granulosum, and an additional four weeks to cross the stratum corneum. The entire epidermis is replaced by new cell growth over a period of about 48 days.

==== Calcium concentration ====
Keratinocyte differentiation throughout the epidermis is in part mediated by a calcium gradient, increasing from the stratum basale until the outer stratum granulosum, where it reaches its maximum, and decreasing in the stratum corneum. Calcium concentration in the stratum corneum is very low in part because those relatively dry cells are not able to dissolve the ions. This calcium gradient parallels keratinocyte differentiation and as such is considered a key regulator in the formation of the epidermal layers.

Elevation of extracellular calcium concentrations induces an increase in intracellular free calcium concentrations. Part of that intracellular increase comes from calcium released from intracellular stores and another part comes from transmembrane calcium influx, through both calcium-sensitive chloride channels and voltage-independent cation channels permeable to calcium. Moreover, it has been suggested that an extracellular calcium-sensing receptor (CaSR) also contributes to the rise in intracellular calcium concentration.

=== Development ===
Epidermal organogenesis, the formation of the epidermis, begins in the cells covering the embryo after neurulation, the formation of the central nervous system. In most vertebrates, this original one-layered structure quickly transforms into a two-layered tissue; a temporary outer layer, the embryonic periderm, which is disposed once the inner basal layer or stratum germinativum has formed.

This inner layer is a germinal epithelium that gives rise to all epidermal cells. It divides to form the outer spinous layer (stratum spinosum). The cells of these two layers, together called the Malpighian layer(s) after Marcello Malpighi, divide to form the superficial granular layer (Stratum granulosum) of the epidermis.

The cells in the stratum granulosum do not divide, but instead form skin cells called keratinocytes from the granules of keratin. These skin cells finally become the cornified layer (stratum corneum), the outermost epidermal layer, where the cells become flattened sacks with their nuclei located at one end of the cell. After birth these outermost cells are replaced by new cells from the stratum granulosum and throughout life they are shed at a rate of 30 – 90 milligrams of skin flakes every hour, or 0.720 - 2.16 grams per day.

Epidermal development is a product of several growth factors, two of which are:

- Transforming growth factor Alpha (TGFα) is an autocrine growth factor by which basal cells stimulate their own division.
- Keratinocyte growth factor (KGF or FGF7) is a paracrine growth factor produced by the underlying dermal fibroblasts in which the proliferation of basal cells is regulated.

== Function ==
=== Barrier ===
The epidermis serves as a barrier to protect the body against microbial pathogens, oxidative stress (UV light), and chemical compounds, and provides mechanical resistance to minor injury. Most of this barrier role is played by the stratum corneum.

Characteristics

- Physical barrier: Epidermal keratinocytes are tightly linked by cell–cell junctions associated to cytoskeletal proteins, giving the epidermis its mechanical strength.
- Chemical barrier: Highly organized lipids, acids, hydrolytic enzymes, and antimicrobial peptides inhibit passage of external chemicals and pathogens into the body.
- Immunologically active barrier: The humoral and cellular constituents of the immune system found in the epidermis actively combat infection.
- Water content of the stratum corneum drops towards the surface, creating hostile conditions for pathogenic microorganism growth.
- An acidic pH (around 5.0) and low amounts of water make the epidermis hostile to many microorganic pathogens.
- Non-pathogenic microorganisms on the surface of the epidermis help defend against pathogens by competing for food, limiting its availability, and producing chemical secretions that inhibit the growth of pathogenic microbiota.

Permeability

- Psychological stress, through an increase in glucocorticoids, compromises the stratum corneum and thus the barrier function.
- Sudden and large shifts in humidity alter stratum corneum hydration in a way that could allow entry of pathogenic microorganisms.

=== Skin hydration ===
The ability of the skin to hold water is primarily due to the stratum corneum and is critical for maintaining healthy skin. Skin hydration is quantified using corneometry. Lipids arranged through a gradient and in an organized manner between the cells of the stratum corneum form a barrier to transepidermal water loss.

=== Skin color ===
The amount and distribution of melanin pigment in the epidermis is the main reason for variation in skin color in Homo sapiens. Melanin is found in the small melanosomes, particles formed in melanocytes from where they are transferred to the surrounding keratinocytes. The size, number, and arrangement of the melanosomes vary between racial groups, but while the number of melanocytes can vary between different body regions, their numbers remain the same in individual body regions in all human beings. In white and Asian skin the melanosomes are packed in "aggregates", but in black skin they are larger and distributed more evenly. The number of melanosomes in the keratinocytes increases with UV radiation exposure, while their distribution remain largely unaffected.

=== Touch ===
The skin contains specialized epidermal touch receptor cells called Merkel cells. Historically, the role of Merkel cells in sensing touch has been thought to be indirect, due their close association with nerve endings. However, recent work in mice and other model organisms demonstrates that Merkel cells intrinsically transform touch into electrical signals that are transmitted to the nervous system.

== Clinical significance ==
Laboratory culture of keratinocytes to form a 3D structure (artificial skin) recapitulating most of the properties of the epidermis is routinely used as a tool for drug development and testing.

=== Hyperplasia ===
Epidermal hyperplasia (thickening resulting from cell proliferation) has various forms:

- Acanthosis is diffuse epidermal hyperplasia (thickening of the skin, and not to be confused with acanthocytes). It implies increased thickness of the Malpighian layer (stratum basale and stratum spinosum). Acanthosis nigricans is a black, poorly defined, velvety hyperpigmented acanthosis, usually observed in the back of neck, axilla, and other folded regions of the skin.
- Focal epithelial hyperplasia (Heck's disease) is an asymptomatic, benign neoplastic condition characterized by multiple white to pinkish papules that occur diffusely in the oral cavity.
- Pseudoepitheliomatous hyperplasia (PEH) is a benign condition characterized by hyperplasia of the epidermis and epithelium of skin appendages, with irregular squamous strands extending down into the dermis, and closely simulating squamous cell carcinoma (SCC).
Acanthosis nigricans

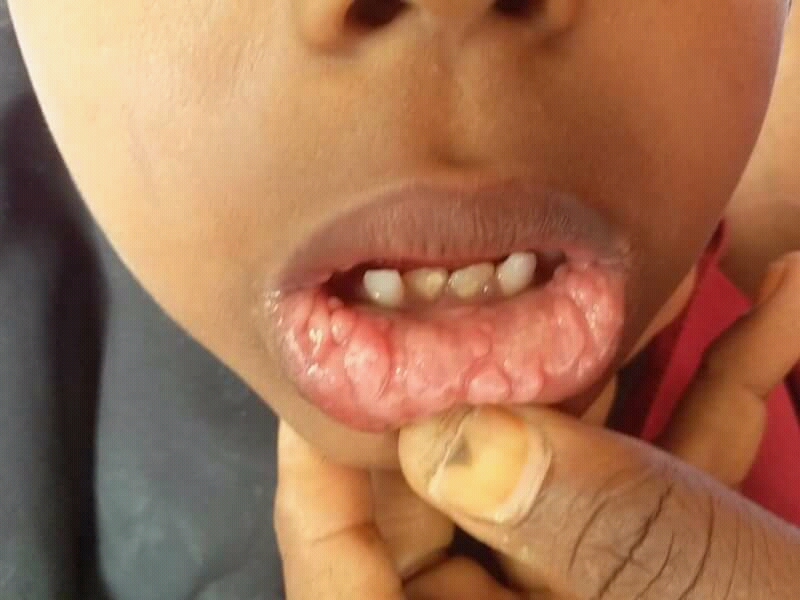
Heck's disease

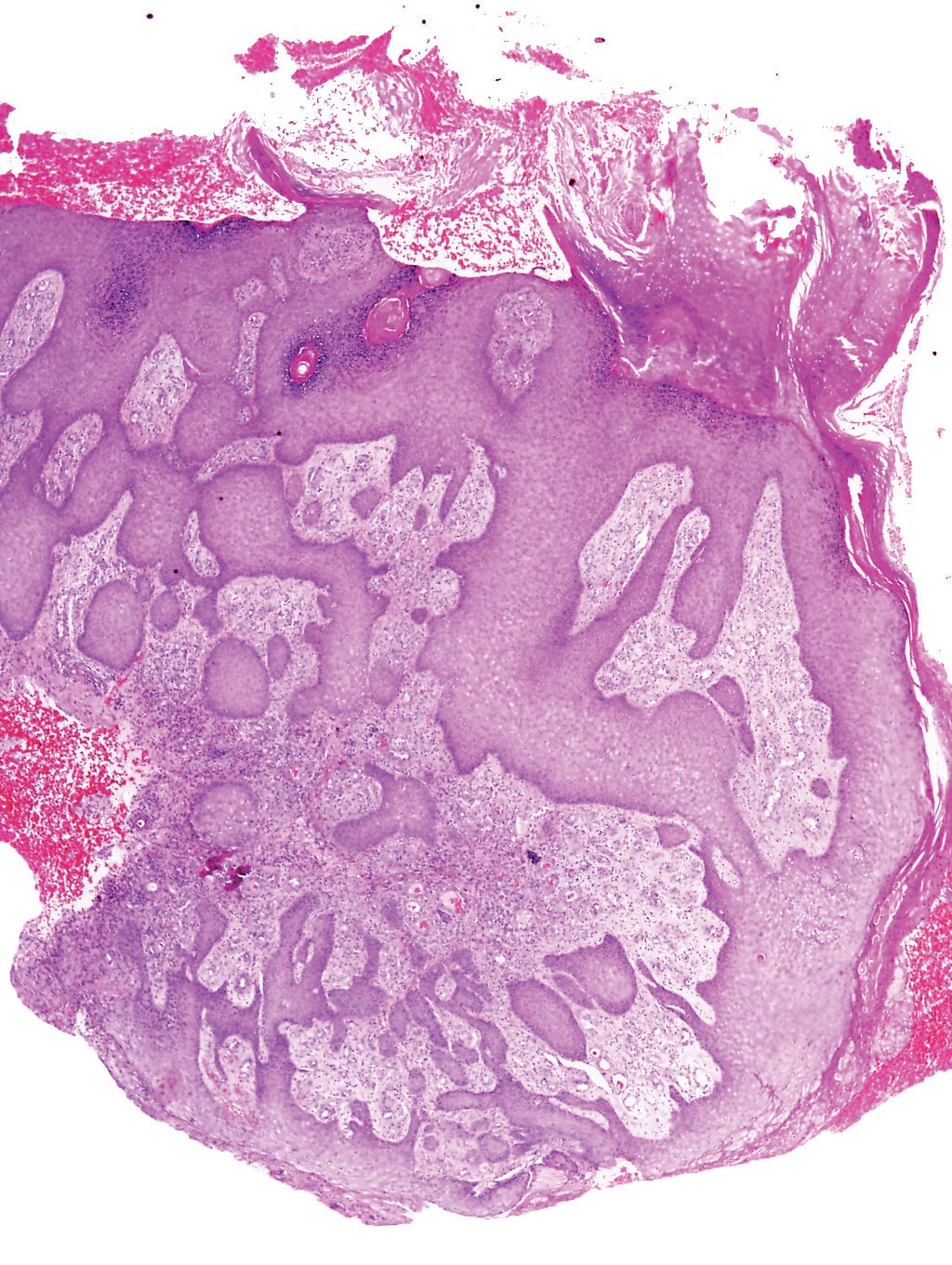
Pseudoepitheliomatous hyperplasia (PEH), low magnification, with acanthotic squamous epithelium with irregular thick finger-like downgrowths into the underlying dermis.

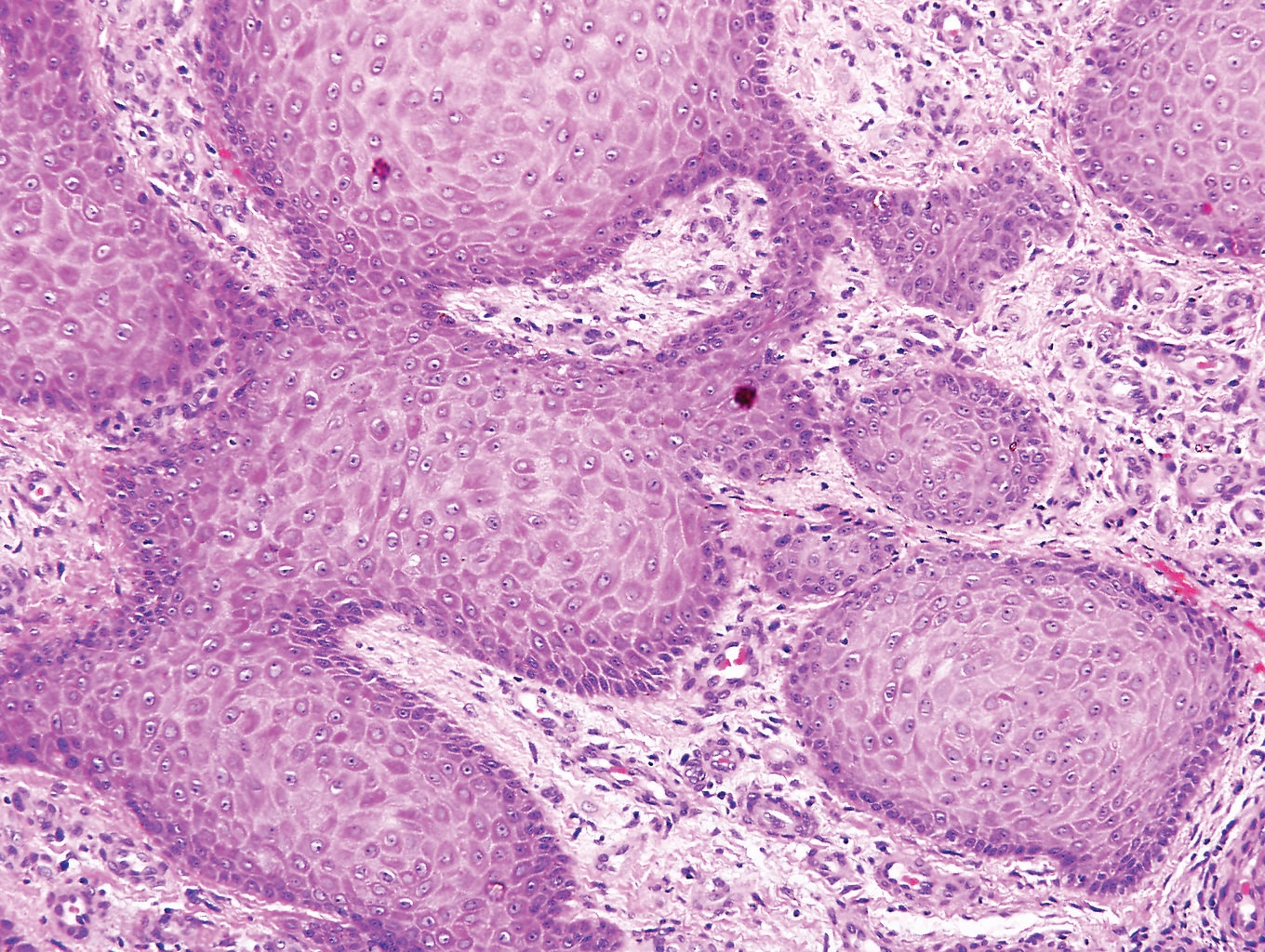
PEH, high magnification, with reactive-appearing squamous downgrowths with no significant cytologic atypia.

In contrast, hyperkeratosis is a thickening of the stratum corneum, and is not necessarily due to hyperplasia.

== Additional images ==
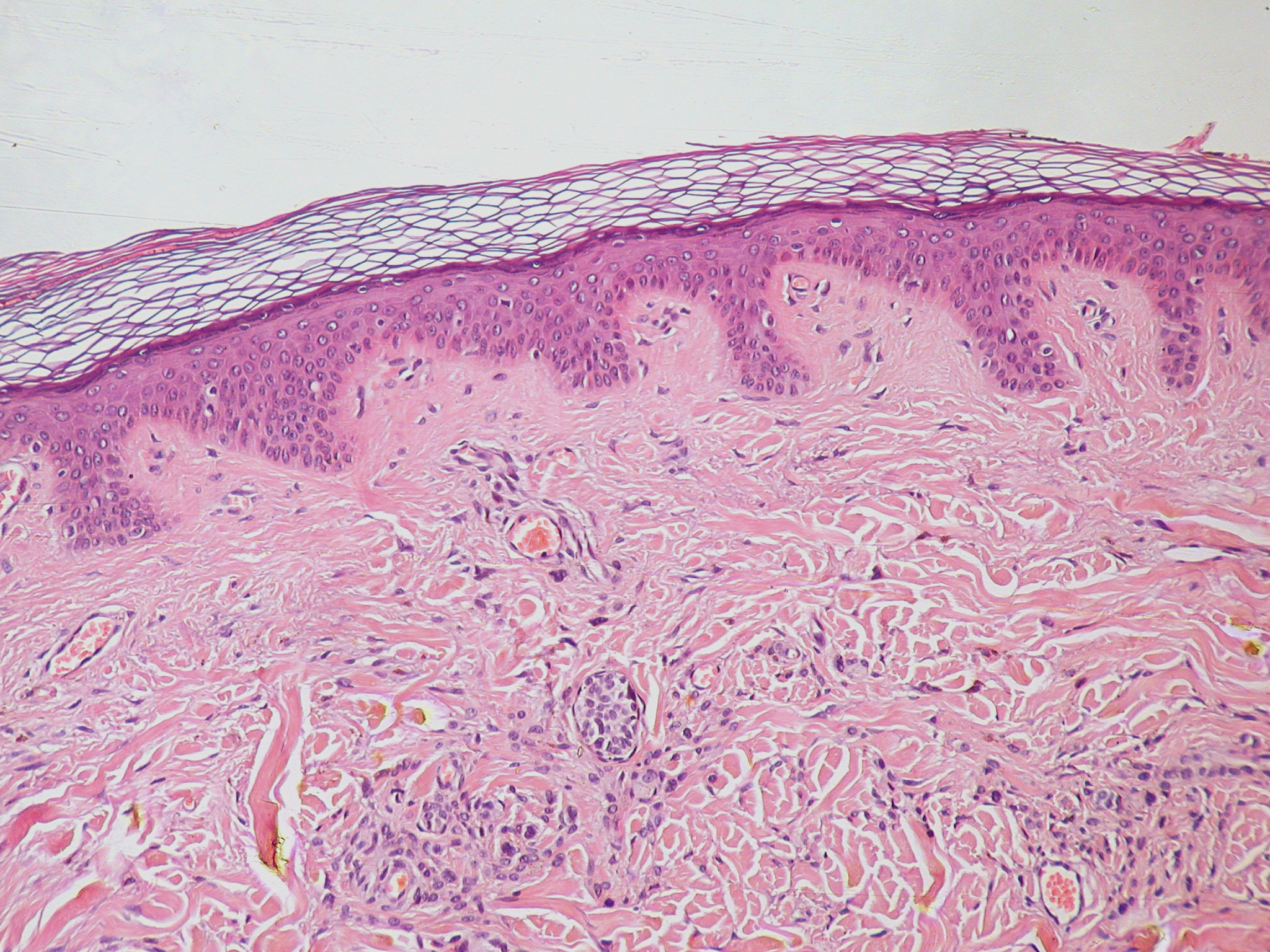
Epidermis and dermis of human skin

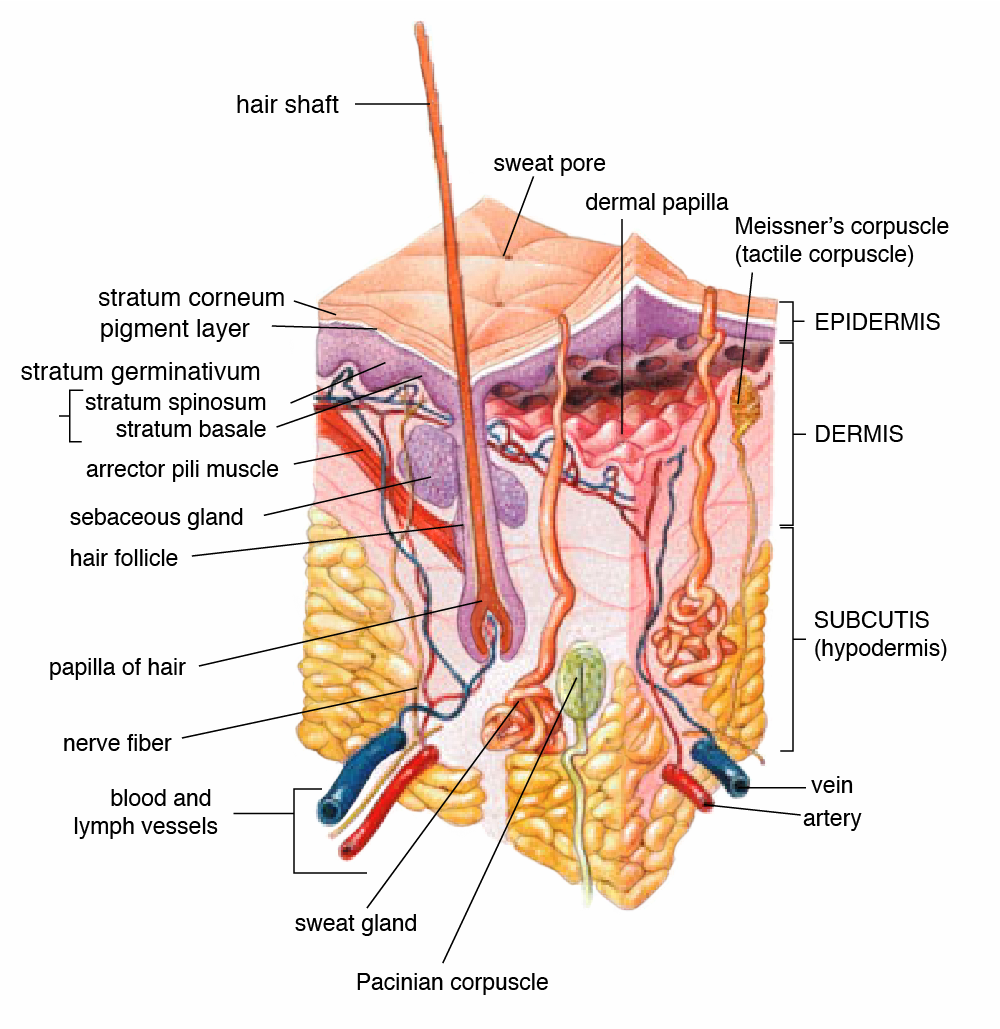
Cross-section of all skin layers

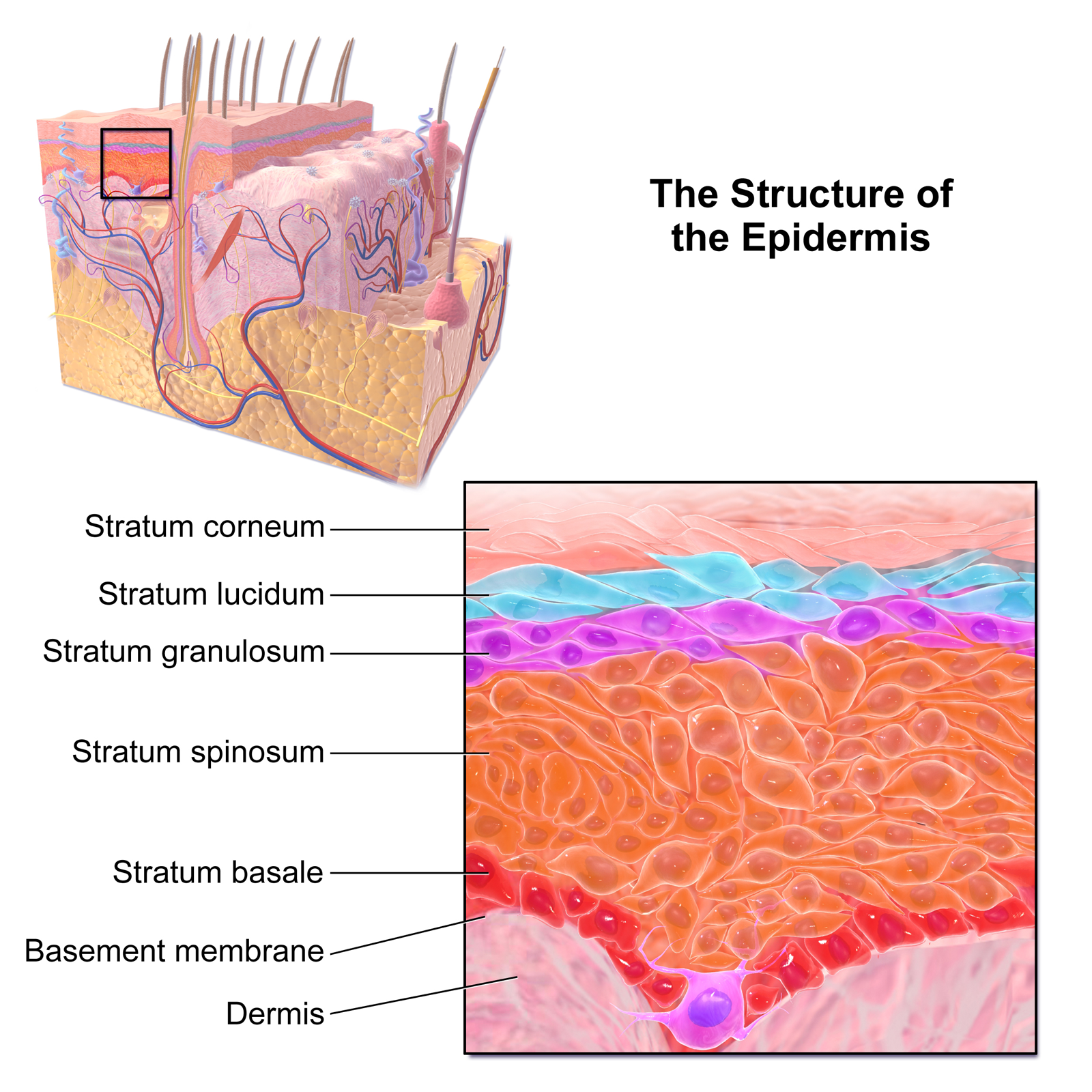
Illustration of epidermal layers

Optical coherence tomography of fingertip

== See also ==
- List of distinct cell types in the adult human body
- Skin repair
