= Perlecan =

Extracellular proteoglycan

HSPG2
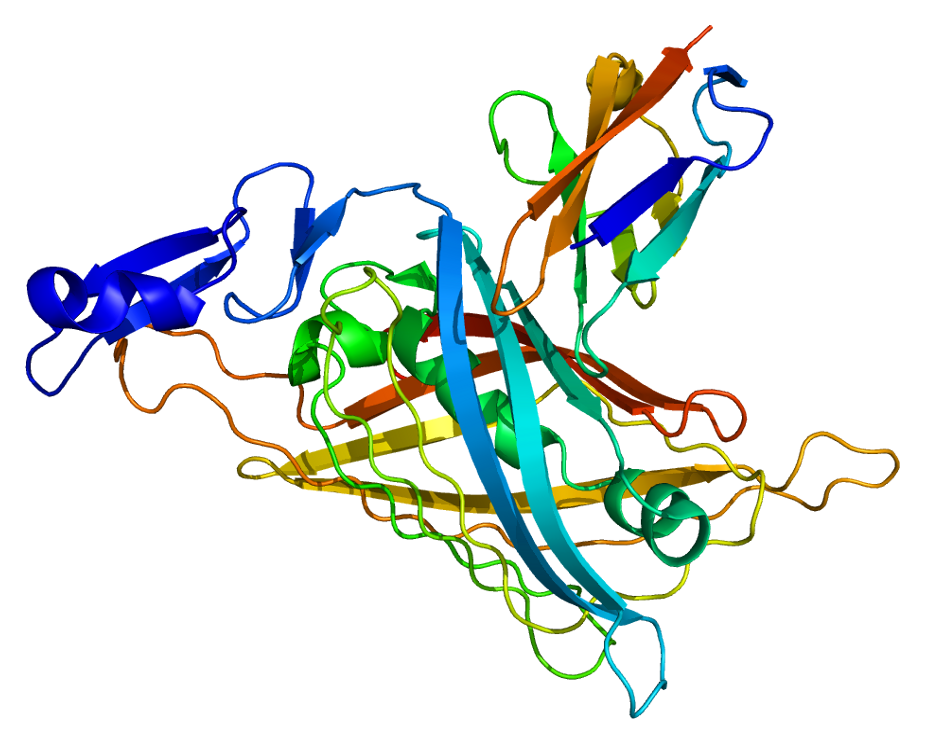

Identifiers
- Aliases: HSPG2, HSPG, PLC, PRCAN, SJA, SJS, SJS1, heparan sulfate proteoglycan 2
- External IDs: OMIM: 142461; MGI: 96257; GeneCards: HSPG2
Available structures
PDB	Ortholog search: PDBe RCSB
PDB	List of PDB id codes 3SH4, 3SH5

Gene location (Human)
Chr.	Chromosome 1 (human)
Band	1p36.12	Start	21,822,244 bp
Band	1p36.12	End	21,937,310 bp

Gene location (Mouse)
Chr.	Chromosome 4 (mouse)
Band	4 D3|4 69.93 cM	Start	137,196,080 bp
Band	4 D3|4 69.93 cM	End	137,297,941 bp
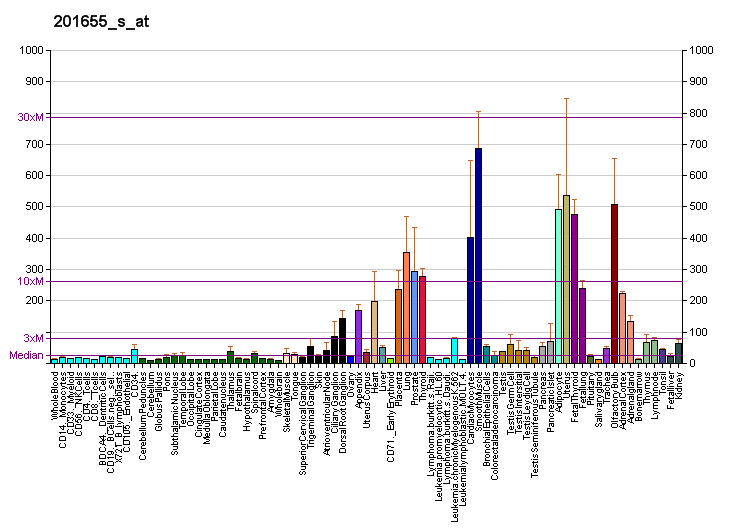

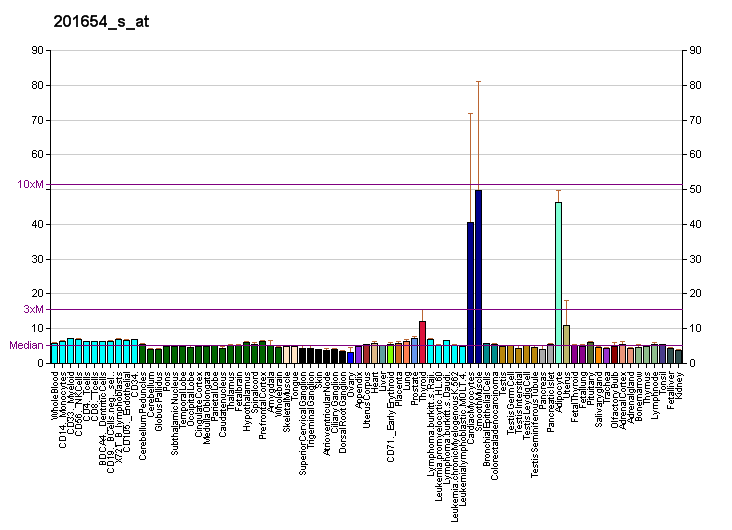
RNA expression pattern
Bgee	Human / Mouse (ortholog); Top expressed in: saphenous vein; popliteal artery; tibial arteries; thoracic aorta; Descending thoracic aorta; ascending aorta; right coronary artery; tibial nerve; left coronary artery; muscle layer of sigmoid colon / Top expressed in: right ventricle; internal carotid artery; external carotid artery; lip; ascending aorta; ankle; muscle of thigh; molar; genital tubercle; tibiofemoral joint; More reference expression data
BioGPS	More reference expression data
Gene ontology
Molecular function	metal ion binding; protein binding; calcium ion binding; protein C-terminus binding; amyloid-beta binding; extracellular matrix structural constituent conferring compression resistance; low-density lipoprotein particle receptor binding
Cellular component	basement membrane; Golgi lumen; extracellular exosome; lysosomal lumen; extracellular region; plasma membrane; extracellular matrix; focal adhesion; extracellular space; collagen-containing extracellular matrix; plasma membrane protein complex
Biological process	glycosaminoglycan metabolic process; extracellular matrix disassembly; retinoid metabolic process; glycosaminoglycan biosynthetic process; glycosaminoglycan catabolic process; angiogenesis; extracellular matrix organization; lipid metabolism; receptor-mediated endocytosis; inflammatory response; brain development; negative regulation of angiogenesis; cell differentiation; animal organ morphogenesis; tissue development; cell migration; substrate adhesion-dependent cell spreading
Sources:Amigo / QuickGO
Orthologs
Databases	NCBI: entry; OMA: entry
Species	Human	Mouse
Entrez	3339	15530
Ensembl	ENSG00000142798	ENSMUSG00000028763
UniProt	P98160	Q05793
RefSeq (mRNA)	NM_001291860; NM_005529	NM_008305
RefSeq (protein)	NP_001278789; NP_005520	NP_032331
Location (UCSC)	Chr 1: 21.82 – 21.94 Mb	Chr 4: 137.2 – 137.3 Mb
PubMed search
- Wikidata
View/Edit Human	View/Edit Mouse

Perlecan (PLC) also known as basement membrane-specific heparan sulfate proteoglycan core protein (HSPG) or heparan sulfate proteoglycan 2 (HSPG2), is a protein that in humans is encoded by the HSPG2 gene. The HSPG2 gene codes for a 4,391 amino acid protein with a molecular weight of 468,829. It is one of the largest known proteins. The name perlecan comes from its appearance as a "string of pearls" in rotary shadowed images.

Perlecan was originally isolated from a tumor cell line and shown to be present in all native basement membranes. Perlecan is a large multidomain (five domains, labeled I-V) proteoglycan that binds to and cross-links many extracellular matrix (ECM) components and cell-surface molecules. Perlecan is synthesized by both vascular endothelial and smooth muscle cells and deposited in the extracellular matrix of parahoxozoans. Perlecan is highly conserved across species and the available data indicate that it has evolved from ancient ancestors by gene duplication and exon shuffling.

== Structure ==
Perlecan consists of a core protein of molecular weight 469 kDa to which three long chains (each approximately 70-100 kDa) of glycosaminoglycans (often heparan sulfate, HS, but can be chondroitin sulfate, CS) are attached. The core protein consists of five distinct structural domains. The N-terminal domain I (aa ~1-195) contains attachment sites for HS chains. Although HS chains are not required for correct folding and secretion of the protein, lack of HS or decreased sulfation can decrease perlecan's ability to interact with matrix proteins. Removal of HS chains may affect matrix organization and endothelial barrier function. Domain II comprises four repeats homologous to the ligand-binding portion of the LDL receptor with six conserved cysteine residues and a pentapeptide, DGSDE, which mediates ligand binding by the LDL receptor. Domain III has homology to the domain IVa and IVb of laminin. Domain IV consists of a series of IG modules. The structure of only the 3rd immunoglobulin (IG)-like repeat in domain IV is shown in the figure labeled "HSPG2". The C-terminal Domain V, which has homology to the G domain of the long arm of laminin, is responsible for self-assembly and may be important for basement membrane formation in vivo. Domain V also has attachment sites for HS/CS chains. Thus, perlecan core protein and HS chains could modulate matrix assembly, cell proliferation, lipoprotein binding and cell adhesion.

== Function ==
Perlecan is a key component of the extracellular matrix of cartilage where it is essential for normal growth plate development and long bone growth. The dwarfism exhibited by the perlecan null mouse resembles the phenotype produced by activating mutations in the gene for FGFR3, a receptor for fibroblast growth factors. Perlecan binds to growth factors involved in growth plate development. Perlecan isolated from developing growth plates has been shown to bind to FGF-2 via its heparan sulfate side chains, and to FGF-18 via domain III of its core protein and mediates their action on FGF receptors. Perlecan likely plays a critical role in the sequestration and/or delivery of FGF-2 and FGF-18 during endochondral ossification.

Perlecan is also a key component of the vascular extracellular matrix, where it interacts with a variety of other matrix components and helps to maintain the endothelial barrier function. Perlecan is a potent inhibitor of smooth muscle cell proliferation and is thus thought to help maintain vascular homeostasis. Perlecan can also promote growth factor (e.g., FGF-2) activity and thus stimulate endothelial growth and re-generation.

== Modification of glycosaminoglycan chains ==
Modifications of the heparan sulfate chains on C- and N-terminal domains are the best-studied differences in the secretory pathway of perlecan. Chondroitin sulfate can be substituted for heparan sulfate, and sulfate incorporation or the sugar composition of the chains can change. Loss of enzymes involved in the heparan sulfate synthetic pathway lead to a number of conditions.

Differential heparan sulfate chain modification can occur through a number of regulatory signals. Perlecan in the growth plate of mouse long bones shows glycosylation changes in the chondrocyte progression from the resting zone to the proliferating zone. Although initially the glycosaminoglycan (GAG) chains of perlecan were thought to be exclusively heparan sulfate, chondroitin sulfate chains can be substituted and this may be dependent upon the cell type. By expressing a recombinant form of the N-terminal domain I of the protein and demonstrating that digestion of the peptide with either heparanase or chondroitinase did not lead to complete loss of the peptide's activity, it was shown that chondroitin sulfate chains can be added to human perlecan. This was in agreement with previous data showing chondroitin sulfate GAG chains attached to bovine perlecan produced by chondrocytes and that recombinant human domain I protein was glycosylated with both heparan and chondroitin sulfate chains when expressed in Chinese Hamster Ovary cells. The preferential addition of heparan sulfate or chondroitin sulfate chains to domains I and V could have an effect on the differentiation of mesenchymal tissues into cartilage, bone or any number of tissues, but the regulatory mechanism of changing from heparan sulfate to chondroitin sulfate addition are not well understood.

While studying the effect of proteoglycan composition on nephritic permselectivity, it was noted that puromycin treatment of human glomerular endothelial cells (HGEC) altered the sulfation level of GAG chains on proteoglycans such as perlecan, which in turn caused a decrease in the stability of the GAG chains. The core protein mRNA levels of proteoglycans were not affected, thus the decrease in GAG chains was as a result of some other factor, which in this case turned out to be a decrease in expression of sulfate transferase enzymes, which play a key role in GAG biosynthesis. It seems that there may be some overlap in diseases stemming from loss of heparan sulfate proteoglycan expression and loss of enzymes involved in heparan sulfate biosynthesis.

== Degradation ==
Cells can modify their extracellular matrix and basement membranes in response to signals or stress. Specific proteases act on the protein in the extracellular environment when cells have a reason to move or change their surroundings. Cathepsin S is a cysteine protease that moderately attenuates binding of FGF-positive cells to a perlecan-positive substrate. Cathepsin S is a potential protease that acts on the core protein of perlecan in the basement membrane or stroma.

The heparan sulfate chains of perlecan bind growth factors in the ECM, and serve as co-ligands or ligand enhancers when bound to receptors. Another study showed that release of HS-bound basic FGF in culture could be achieved through treatment with stromelysin, heparitinase I, rat collagenase and plasmin, and these proteolysis sites are illustrated in figure 1. This was proposed as a non-exhaustive list of the proteases that could mediate release of growth factors from the heparan sulfate chains of perlecan. Although Whitelock et al. suggested that thrombin cleavage consensus sequences exist in the core protein of perlecan, they also postulate that any thrombin activation of perlecan actually comes from cleavage of other ECM constituents. This article states that heparanase is responsible for cleavage of the heparan sulfate chains of perlecan in matrix. This releases growth factors bound to the heparan sulfate, specifically FGF-10. Addition of heparanase to cell culture of epithelia in basement membrane caused an increase in epithelial cell proliferation due to FGF-10 release.

In a model of explant growth in vitro using corneal epithelium, Matrix Metalloproteinase (MMP) 2 expression correlates with an initial degradation of the original basement membrane. Reformation of basement membrane in culture was dependent on an initial upregulation followed by a downregulation of MMP-9, in contrast to the constant expression of MMP-2. This is not evidence that MMP-2 and MMP-9 directly cleave perlecan protein in vivo but shows that the proteins clearly modulate some factor in maturation of basement membrane. Another family of metalloproteases, the Bone Morphogenetic Protein 1/Tolloid-like family, releases the c-terminal endorepellin domain of the perlecan core protein. The laminin-like globular domain contains the active motif of endorepellin, and is unable to be cleaved by cells expressing mutant and inactive forms of the BMP-1 proteins. Furthermore, the critical residue necessary for this cleavage to take place was localized to Asp4197. This proteolytic process may have significance in disease as a corresponding fragment was found in the urine of patients suffering end-stage renal failure and in the amniotic fluid of pregnant women who have undergone premature rupture of the membrane.

== Expression ==
=== Expression during development ===
Timing of gene expression during development varies from tissue to tissue. Basement membranes are often the driving force behind separating epithelia from stroma and connective tissue. Perlecan is of particular importance in cardiovascular, neural and cartilaginous development.

Pre-implantation blastocyst development is a controlled cascade of gene regulation and intercellular signaling. Extracellular perlecan has been observed at the blastocyst stage of mouse embryonic development, specifically upregulated at the point when the embryo reaches “attachment competence”. This finding was upheld at both the mRNA level and the protein level, shown by RT-PCR and immunostaining. Later embryonic development is just as precisely regulated as pre-implantation development, and is more complicated due to differentiation of all tissues. The first study of perlecan expression during embryonal development found that the protein was first expressed during development of the cardiovascular system, and later correlates with maturation of the majority of tissues in the body, i.e. separation of epithelial layers from endothelia and stroma by basement membranes. Again, this upregulation during cardiovascular development is concomitant with the role of perlecan's C-terminus as endorepellin.

Spatio-temporal specificity in trans-activation of the perlecan gene during development is key to the maturation of basement membranes and thus to the complete separation of epithelia from endothelia and stroma. A thorough study of perlecan expression during chick embryo development has shown that perlecan is present at the morula stage and for the rest of development, although expression can be transient and precisely timed in certain tissue predecessors. In the rat embryo, perlecan expression has been shown to increase in vascular smooth muscle cells (VSMCs) post e19 in fetal development. This correlates perfectly with the ceasing of proliferation of VSMCs at e18 and a change in their phenotype. The theory put forward in this study is that perlecan plays an anti-proliferative role for VSMCs once a certain developmental point is reached, much like confluence-dependent expression of perlecan in culture. These findings were corroborated by similar results from studies of rat pulmonary artery and lung epithelia. These tissues also were found to begin perlecan production once cell division had ceased, around fetal day 19.

The development of the nervous system and extension of axons is precisely directed by cues from extracellular matrix molecules. Olfactory neurite outgrowth in mouse development is guided at least in part by an ECM laid down by olfactory epithelial cells (OECs). Perlecan and laminin-1 appear to be important in this guidance pathway, although perlecan induction occurs slightly later than laminin-1. This data is supported by earlier data showing that OECs express FGF-1 during olfactory development, and that perlecan can stimulate olfactory sensory neurite outgrowth in culture in the presence of FGF-1. Perlecan also showed nerve adhesive properties in a previous study, further suggesting that it may act in an attractive role in combination with laminin rather than a repulsive one.

Cartilage and bone development have proven to be dependent upon perlecan expression. The protein becomes visible by immunostaining on day 15 during mouse development, independently from other basement membrane proteins, suggesting that it is simply a part of the ECM of developing chondrocytes, in addition to collagen II and other cartilage markers that are expressed starting on day 12. Taken with the data, that mice lacking the pln gene cannot maintain stable cartilage, it is apparent that perlecan is essential to the maturation and stability of cartilaginous structure. This is supported by a study showing that knockdown of perlecan production inhibits the final stages of chondrogenic differentiation in C3H10T1/2 fibroblasts in culture. Bone development, i.e. mineralization of cartilaginous tissue, correlates with loss of perlecan and heparan sulfate at the chondro-osseous junction (COJ). In an effort to understand how heparan sulfate and perlecan direct mesenchymal stem cells into the osteogenic pathway, human mesenchymal stem cells were treated with heparanase and chondroitinase in culture. This led to increased mineralization and expression of osteocyte markers, supporting the data showing that loss of heparan sulfate at the COJ is a key factor in osteogenesis. It is thought that the driving force behind heparanase and chondroitinase activation of osteogenesis is release of bone morphogenetic protein bound in the heparan sulfate chains.

==== Animal models ====
Perlecan knockdown in embryonic zebrafish has been achieved through the use of Morpholinos targeted to the perlecan transcript. Morpholinos were used to block translation of the perlecan mRNA in zebrafish embryos, as part of an investigation into perlecan function in skeletal and vascular development. The Morpholino targets the five prime untranslated region of the perlecan mRNA thus blocking translation of the message. Loss of the perlecan protein in these fish led to serious myopathies and circulation problems. As shown in a later study from the same laboratory, this phenotype could be rescued through the addition of exogenous VEGF-A.

The importance of perlecan to mammalian development is demonstrated by perlecan gene knockout experiments. Nearly half of all mice in which the perlecan gene has been knocked out (perlecan null mice) die at embryonic day 10.5, when the perlecan gene normally starts to be expressed. Others die just after birth with severe defects such as abnormal basement membrane formation, defective cephalic and long bone development and achondroplasia. The knockout strategy employed for one of the perlecan knockouts was a floxing of exon 6 by insertion of a neomycin cassette, and subsequent CRE expression for removal of exon 6 from the genome. This resulted in the cartilage-compromised phenotype previously discussed and loss of basement membrane integrity in a variety of tissues. The fetal mortality rate is high and the mouse that survive die soon after birth. A separately developed perlecan knockout mouse model was created by insertion of a neomycin cassette into exon 7 of the perlecan gene. These knockout mice were also 40% embryonic lethal, with the rest of the mice dying soon after birth due to severe skeletal abnormalities. The perlecan knock out phenotype in both studies were identical and similar to the phenotype produced by activating mutations in the gene for FGFR3, a receptor for fibroblast growth factors.

In yet another mouse knockout model, the perlecan gene was mutated by homologous recombination of the endogenous perlecan gene with a construct containing 2 and 5 kb arms of homology surrounding a deleted exon 3, which codes for 2 of the 3 heparan sulfate attachment sites in domain I of perlecan. Perlecan produced by cultured fibroblasts from exon 3 knockout mice, however, contained 40% Heparan sulfate and 60% chondroitin sulfate because, in addition to the one heparan sulfate attachment site remaining on domain I, the attachment site on domain V would also still be present. The study showed that the exon 3 knockout mice had collapse of lens capsule integrity by postnatal week 3, indicating a role for the amino acids deleted from domain I of perlecan in maintaining lens capsule basement membrane integrity. Unlike the perlecan knockout mice however, viability and long bone growth in the exon 3 knockout mice was normal. This suggests that, in the exon 3 knockout, the remaining attachment sites for heparan sulfate on domains I and V available for FGF-2 binding or the site on domain 3 available for FGF-18 binding may be sufficient for normal long bone growth.

Changes to the lens in the exon 3 knock out mice are somewhat similar to the TGF-β knockout mouse model. Exon 3 knockout mice also showed decreased wound healing and angiogenesis capabilities when challenged by either epidermal injury or FGF-2 addition to the cornea. In the epidermal injury study, a wound spanning the depth of the epidermis was created in exon 3-negative mice and control mice, and in the knockout mice angiogenesis and the hallmarks of wound healing were slow to develop possibly due to decreased growth factor sequestration by the heparan sulfate-negative perlecan. A similar result was produced in the corneal micropocket assay, where FGF-2 is implanted into the cornea of mice and in normal mice angiogenesis is induced. In the knockout mice this angiogenic effect was impaired, although not completely.

A full-length perlecan construct, under control of the collagen type II promoter, was used to make a perlecan transgenic mouse. The collagen type II promoter allowed perlecan expression in the extracellular matrix made by chondrocytes only but not in the basement membranes made by endothelial, epithelial or muscle cells. The perlecan transgene in the perlecan null mouse eliminated lethality and restored long bone growth to normal. This suggests that perlecan plays a critical role in cartilage development. The perlecan transgenic mice, however, exhibited muscle hypertrophy, indicating a role for perlecan in muscle development as well as in cartilage growth plate mediated long bone growth.

Studies from gene knockout mice and human diseases have also revealed critical in vivo roles for perlecan in cartilage development and neuromuscular junction activity.

=== Signaling pathways and their effect on expression ===
Signaling pathways function to elevate or decrease levels of transcription of genes, which in turn cause cells to change their gene expression profile. The end effect of signaling pathways is exerted on the promoter of genes, which can include elements upstream or downstream of the transcriptional start site, some of which can exist inside of the transcribed gene itself. A number of signaling molecules can effect changes in perlecan expression including the transforming growth factor-Beta (TGF-β), interleukin(IL) and vascular endothelial growth factor (VEGF) families of molecules.

==== Transcriptional activation ====
The upstream 2.5 kilobases of the perlecan promoter region were studied by CAT activation in cell lines of various histological origins. This study concluded that there existed a TGF-β responsive element in the promoter just 285 base pairs upstream of the transcriptional start site. This result has been corroborated in such tissues as human colon carcinoma cells. and murine uterine epithelium by in vitro addition of the cytokine to cell culture medium. In vitro studies of TGF-β1 signaling and its effects on perlecan expression can have varying results in different cell types. In human coronary smooth muscle cells in culture, TGF-β1 signaling showed no effect on perlecan expression although it did upregulate other matrix constituents. In vivo demonstration of the dynamic regulation of perlecan and its control by extracellular signaling pathways is critical to our understanding of the protein's role in development. To this end, a transgenic mouse line was created expressing porcine TGF-β1 under the lens-specific αA-crystallin promoter and then another similar line was created but with the gene driven by the βb-crystallin promoter, corresponding to another lens-specific gene. This developmentally dynamic tissue showed a serious misregulation of extracellular matrix components including perlecan with TGF-β1 over expression. Corneal opacification occurred in both transgenic lines early in development due to greatly increased expression of perlecan, fibronectin and thrombospondin-1 in the corneal mesenchyme. The effect was more pronounced in the βB-1 Crystallin promoter-driven line.

The IL family of inflammatory cytokines also upregulates the pln transcript. In a mouse model of Alzheimer's plaque formation, IL-1-alpha effects an increase in perlecan expression in response to brain injury. IL-4 treatment of human gingival fibroblasts in culture led to increased production of various heparan sulfate proteoglycans including perlecan. Treatment of human lung fibroblasts in vitro with IL-1-beta did not lead to any significant increase in perlecan production.

Another signaling pathway shown to augment pln transcription is the VEGF pathway. VEGF165 treatment of human brain microvascular endothelial cells in culture stimulates increased pln transcription. This molecule is a ligand of VEGF Receptor-2 (VGFR2), and it seems that this VEGF165 response is specific for perlecan upregulation, leading to a positive feedback loop involving fibroblastic growth factor (FGF), FGF Receptor (FGFR) and VEGFR2 in response to endothelial damage. This microvascular-specific regulation by VEGF165 raises the possibility that the anti-coagulant function of perlecan is a part of the damage-control process in brain endothelia.

Protein Kinase C signaling is putatively responsible for upregulating transcription and translation of certain proteoglycans including perlecan. When the endocytic pathway of HeLa cells is inhibited by overexpression of a mutant dynamin, Protein Kinase C is activated and perlecan message and protein are subsequently increased. In contrast, the usual downregulation of perlecan in response to hyperglycemia is lost in mice negative for PKC-α.

==== Transcriptional downregulation ====
Interferon-γ signaling mediates transcriptional repression of the perlecan gene. This was first shown in colon cancer cell lines, and subsequently in cell lines of other tissue origins, but in each case intact STAT1 transcription factor was required for the signal to take effect. This led the investigators to believe that the transcription factor STAT1 was interacting with the Pln promoter in the distal region, localized to 660 base pairs upstream of the transcription start site. Interferon- γ treatment of blastocyst-stage murine embryos leads to a loss of perlecan expression on the trophectoderm, and thus an embryonic morphology and phenotype in cell culture, which is suggestive that these interferon-γ treated blastocysts would be defective in implantation. Presumably the loss of perlecan expression stems from downregulation of transcription via STAT1 transcription factor activity as shown previously. These in vitro results are not necessarily representative of normal physiological interferon- γ concentrations, nor are the cytokine normally expressed widely but instead at very specific developmental timepoints. Important to note is that perlecan expression can be decreased by treatment with an exogenous cytokine such as interferon- γ, and if there were a physiologically abnormal increase in expression of the cytokine it could interfere with implantation.

=== Cell stressors and their effect on expression ===
Mechanical and chemical stress can damage basement membranes or the cells they support. This could influence the gene expression profile of the cells, especially in their extracellular matrix, which often provides physical support and a chemical barrier for the cells. Hypoxia, inflammation, mechanical and chemical stress have been examined as to how they relate to perlecan expression.

Hypoxia is a condition found in disease states and during injury and often results in a lack of endothelial cell proliferation. This and perlecan's role as endorepellin prompted one study into the nature of perlecan expression regulation by endothelial cells during hypoxic conditions. Under hypoxic conditions, this study found that perlecan expression by rat cardiac microvascular endothelial cells was decreased sixty-one percent compared to normal controls. The contention of this paper is that perlecan downregulation leads to a loss of FAK activation and thus less ERK signaling, leading to decreased cell proliferation. It does seem counterintuitive that endothelial cells would proliferate less quickly due to loss of perlecan and its endorepellin subunit. It could be that these endothelial cells merely downregulated transcription of many genes in response to hypoxic conditions. In another study, hypoxia led to induction of genes associated with apoptosis and cell death, but repression of genes was not limited to proteins associated with a specific pathway. When T84 intestinal epithelial cells are exposed to hypoxic conditions for 24 hours a significant increase in perlecan mRNA and protein production occurs. They relate this to the fact that many genes elevated in response to hypoxia contain a cAMP response element (CRE) in their promoter, as does pln. This difference between endothelial cells from the study in 2007 and the epithelial cell studied in these experiments is indicative of how varied the regulatory mechanisms of perlecan may be in different cell types.

The development of beta-amyloid plaques on the brain is associated with onset of Alzheimer's disease. These plaques induce a constant state of inflammation in areas of accumulation, leading to expression of certain inflammation-related gene products, some of which perpetuate the inflammation in the brain context. As previously mentioned, to investigate the effect of brain inflammation on expression levels of perlecan, needle stab wounds were created in mice brains, and after inflammation and variable periods of recovery, mRNA and protein levels were assessed via in situ hybridization and immunostaining. Perlecan levels were increased in the hippocampus but not in the striatum during the healing period, along with IL 1-alpha expression. Perlecan expression was traced to microglial cells in the hippocampus and astrocytes. This role for perlecan in beta-amyloid plaque generation is supported by an earlier study showing that perlecan and beta-amyloid treatment of rat brains led to formation of senile plaques, whereas treatment with beta-amyloid alone did not have the same effect.

At the organismic level, mechanical stress has a profound impact on extracellular matrix integrity and probably causes induction of a number of ECM genes for repair and remodeling of ECM in tissue stroma and basement membranes. One study examined the in vitro effects of pressure on global gene transcription using a microarray approach and a cell stretching system meant to simulate intraocular pressure in the lamina cribosa (connective tissue) of the optic nerve head. Their findings were that perlecan and several other proteoglycans were upregulated in response to the stretching stimulus. TGF-β2 and VEGF were induced as well, possibly contributing to the upregulation of the perlecan transcript and protein. It has been shown that autocrine TGF-β signaling is a compensatory result of mechanical stress in vitro in endothelial cells. Using a similar cell stretching mechanism to mimic arterial pressure, this investigation showed that perlecan production increased in response to mechanical strain. This is contingent upon TGF-β autocrine signaling in a positive feedback loop with p38 and ERK. This endothelial cell increase in production of VSMC growth inhibitors (i.e. heparin) is reversed in VSMCs, where mechanical stress induces proliferation. Deformation of VSMC cells in culture leads to perlecan upregulation, with a significant increase in sulfation of the heparan sulfate chains. This is not in contrast to the data shown where perlecan expression is constant beyond e19 in rat VSMC, which suggested that perlecan plays an antiproliferative role for VSMCs. In this case, it seems that the molecule's signaling function is the operative upregulated factor, especially due to the increase in sulfation of the heparan sulfate chains.

Chemical damage to organs can affect not only the cell's genetic and mechanical integrity but the extracellular matrix of the tissue. To study the effect of chemical damage on liver cells, Wistar rats were treated with carbon tetrachloride for 48 hours prior to sacrificing. Prior to treatment with CCl_{4}, perlecan staining was limited to the bile duct and sinusoidal blood vessels of the liver. After treatment, perlecan staining was intense in areas of necrosis. This could have been due to the increase in capillarization of the liver as an attempt to regenerate damaged tissue. A similar finding was shown in acetamenophin treatment of mice, where perlecan and other matrix components were heavily expressed in necrotic lesions of the liver.

=== Expression in cell culture ===
One of the resounding arguments against the validity of in vitro results of cell culture on 2D plastic plates is that the environment does not accurately reflect that of the cells in the organism. This problem is being dealt with by developing 3D cell cultures using a wide variety of substrates as the scaffolds or environments for the cells. In this kind of setting the expression of ECM genes has the potential to more closely resemble that of the native expression profile. 3D scaffolds, the structures on which the cultured cells grow, can be composed of other cells, i.e. cocultures, synthetic polymers mimicking the cells natural environment or purified ECM such as matrigel, and any mixture of these three components.

One such system has been developed to study skin development and basal membrane formation between keratinocytes and the stroma. This system is used to delineate the development of basement membrane between fibroblasts in the stroma (in this case fibroblasts in a type-I collagen gel) and keratinocytes grown on top of the gel. Perlecan expression and thus basement membrane maturation is dependent on nidogen crosslinking of collagen IV and laminin γ1 chain in this system. This effect also led to a lack of hemidesmosomes in the developing tissue. Another system using a disorganized hydrated collagen I gel has been used to demonstrate that primary human corneal fibroblasts will eventually invade the gel and create a matrix consisting of collagen type I and perlecan, as well as several other sulfated matrix glycoproteins. This mimics the in vivo corneal fibroblast's developmental program and response to injury.

One of the long-term goals of creating 3D cell culture systems is to engineer tissues that can be used as replacements for patients with many types of disease. In tissue engineered heart valves created by seeding myofibroblasts onto collagen type I followed by endothelial cells, heparan sulfate proteoglycan expression has been verified, although no distinction between syndecan and perlecan has been made in these tissues. Another procedure that could be made possible by tissue engineering is keratoepithelioplasty. Transplanted tissue must remain intact, which requires a pre-formed basement membrane. Collagen gels have promoted formation of a complete basement membrane by corneal epithelial cells in culture.

Perlecan also holds promise to serve as a scaffold for plating cells in culture. Human salivary gland ductal and acinar cells have been successfully grown on a bioactive peptide containing a sequence repeated in domain IV of the perlecan protein. These cells reproduce acini-like structures similar to those found in the native gland and tight junctions, along with complete basement membranes in culture.

== Disease association ==
=== Cancer ===
While Perlecan suppression causes substantial inhibition of tumor growth and neovascularization in null mice, in contrast, when perlecan-null cells are injected into nude mice enhanced tumor growth is observed when compared to controls. Cancer progression and pathogenesis is intimately linked to extracellular matrix composition and the role of perlecan and other ECM molecules in cancer is being studied by a large number of laboratories. Since the basement membrane is the first obstacle in the way of extravasating carcinoma cells, the functions of perlecan in this process are multiple. One model system used to study perlecan expression in carcinoma cell lines is that of the MeWo/70W melanoma metastatic progression cell lines. MeWo cells are characteristically less invasive than their clonal variant cell line 70W. One lab studied perlecan expression in 27 invasive melanomas and 26 of the 27 samples showed a significant increase in perlecan message when compared to normal tissue from the same patients. They then used the MeWo and 70W cell lines to study if perlecan expression changed during treatment with neurotrophins, which can stimulate cell invasion through matrigel in vitro. The more invasive 70W cells began expressing perlecan message ten minutes after stimulation with the neurotrophins, and the MeWo cells did not produce any pln message regardless of treatment. This study took special note of the fact that perlecan upregulation occurred even before that of heparanase, an essential protein involved in the process of extravasation.

In ovarian cancer as in other cancers, perlecan expression occurs differently throughout progression of the disease. Perlecan staining is lost in ovarian basement membrane that has been breached by an invasive adenocarcinoma, which is in contrast to perlecan staining in the basement membranes of normal ovaries and those with benign tumors, where basement membrane is homogeneous and very similar in composition to that in other normal tissues. This is consistent with other results showing loss of perlecan in basement membranes affected by invasive cervical cancer spreading to the pelvic lymph nodes, which comes as no surprise due to the correlation of elevated levels of heparanase mRNA expression with invasion of similar cervical carcinoma. By contrast, tumor formation of the immortalized mouse epithelial cell line RT101 injected into rats was dependent on perlecan expression by the mouse cells and not on the presence of endogenous rat perlecan. RT101 cells with perlecan knocked down by antisense did not show tumor formation in this system, however cells expressing the antisense perlecan and a recombinant construct encoding domains I, II, and III of mouse perlecan did indeed show tumor formation. Thus in this system it does appear that tumor cell expression of perlecan is necessary for tumor aggregation. More research into GAG chain or core protein modification by invasive tumor cells as compared to benign tumor cells and normal tissue would be informative to better understand perlecans role in cancer migration.

Several laboratories have studied in vitro tumor cell angiogenesis using antisense constructs to the perlecan message. The full-length reverse complement cDNA, driven by a strong promoter, is transfected into various cell types to eliminate perlecan expression. Antisense in colon carcinoma cells blocks perlecan translation, leading to decreased tumor growth and angiogenesis. A similar in vitro decrease in proliferation occurred in NIH 3T3 cells and a human melanoma cell line expressing antisense perlecan mRNA. Findings in vitro with Kaposi's sarcoma cell lines showed that loss of perlecan via transfection with an antisense construct led to decreased proliferation and migration of this highly metastatic cell type. These results are in contrast to in vivo results with the same Kaposi Sarcoma lines, which show that decreased perlecan leads to increased angiogenesis, which facilitates migration and thus is associated with increase in tumor grade. Antisense knockdown of perlecan in fibrosarcoma cell lines led to increased growth and migration both in vitro and in vivo. These findings of greater tumorigenesis in vivo are supported by data showing that the C-terminus of the perlecan protein acts as an endostatic module now known as endorepellin.

A ribozyme construct was created for use in knocking down perlecan translation levels. This ribozyme was targeted at a sequence coding domain I of the perlecan protein. It reduced expression of perlecan up to 80% in the prostate cancer cell line C42B. In contrast to previously discussed studies these cells produced smaller tumors than their parental cells when injected into athymic mice. What this disparity in results means for invasion is unknown, although it is true that perlecan is part of the extracellular matrix in mesenchymal tissue, and cells undergoing epithelial-mesenchymal transition (EMT) may upregulate perlecan expression as part of their EMT programming.

=== Diabetes and cardiovascular disease ===
Perlecan levels are decreased in many disease states - e.g., diabetes, atherosclerosis and arthritis. Perlecan has an important role in the maintenance of the glomerular filtration barrier. Decreased perlecan in the glomerular basement membrane has a central role in the development of diabetic albuminuria. Perlecan expression is down regulated by many atherogenic stimuli and thus Perlecan is thought to play a protective role in atherosclerosis. Diabetes and atherosclerosis are commonly associated syndromes. 80% of diabetes-associated deaths involve some form of atherosclerotic complication, and the basement membrane of endothelia has been implicated in the atherogenic process. Synthesis of heparan sulfate was shown to decrease in the arteries of diabetics and in arteries developing atherosclerotic lesions.

The mechanism by which heparan sulfate was downregulated in these lesions remained unknown for some time. One theory states that high glucose in circulation could lead to a decrease in GAG chain attachment to perlecan, but not necessarily a change in the synthetic pathway of the GAG chains or that of the core protein. After treatment of human aortic endothelial cells with high glucose medium, secreted perlecan contained less sulfate incorporation accompanied by less overall GAG chain incorporation. Although no signaling pathway is identified leading to this decrease in GAG chain incorporation, it is suggested that the 30% loss in overall glycosylation of the protein could mean loss of one of the three HS chains on perlecan in this model of diabetes-associated hyperglycemia. It is also noted that similar decreases in extracellular HS without a change in staining for the core protein chains occur in diabetic kidneys and in kidney cells in culture treated with high glucose.

Atherosclerosis is most often the culprit in coronary heart disease and other cardiovascular conditions, and a large aggregation of perlecan protein is symptomatic of advanced atherosclerotic plaques. VSMCs are the producers of the perlecan in this condition, meaning that a good deal of research has been focused on understanding the means of perlecan upregulation in this condition. In a test of the effect of circulating nonesterified fatty acids (symptomatic of diabetes and atherogenesis) on perlecan expression by VSMCs, expression did not change when compared to control cells. This was in contrast to a 2-10-fold increase in expression of other basement membrane proteoglycans. Thrombin is another marker associated with atherogenesis and procoagulation, and it selectively upregulates production of perlecan but not other proteoglycans in human VSMCs in culture. It is suggested that this effect is only seen when VSMCs reach confluence, but not prior to confluence. This concept is similar to previously mentioned studies showing that perlecan is only produced by VSMCs once they have ceased proliferation during development. Another marker in the atherosclerotic pathway is angiotensin II, which also upregulates perlecan expression in VSMCs in culture. Given the prominence of perlecan expression in atherosclerosis there is potential for therapy based upon perlecan expression and research may eventually proceed in that direction.

=== Genetic disease ===
Mutations in the HSPG2 gene, which encodes perlecan, cause dyssegmental dysplasia, Silverman-Handmaker type and Schwartz–Jampel syndrome.

== Interactions ==
Perlecan has been shown to interact with

- FBLN2,
- FGF7,
- FGFBP1, and
- Transthyretin.
- FGF-2,
- FGF-18
