= Béla Schick =

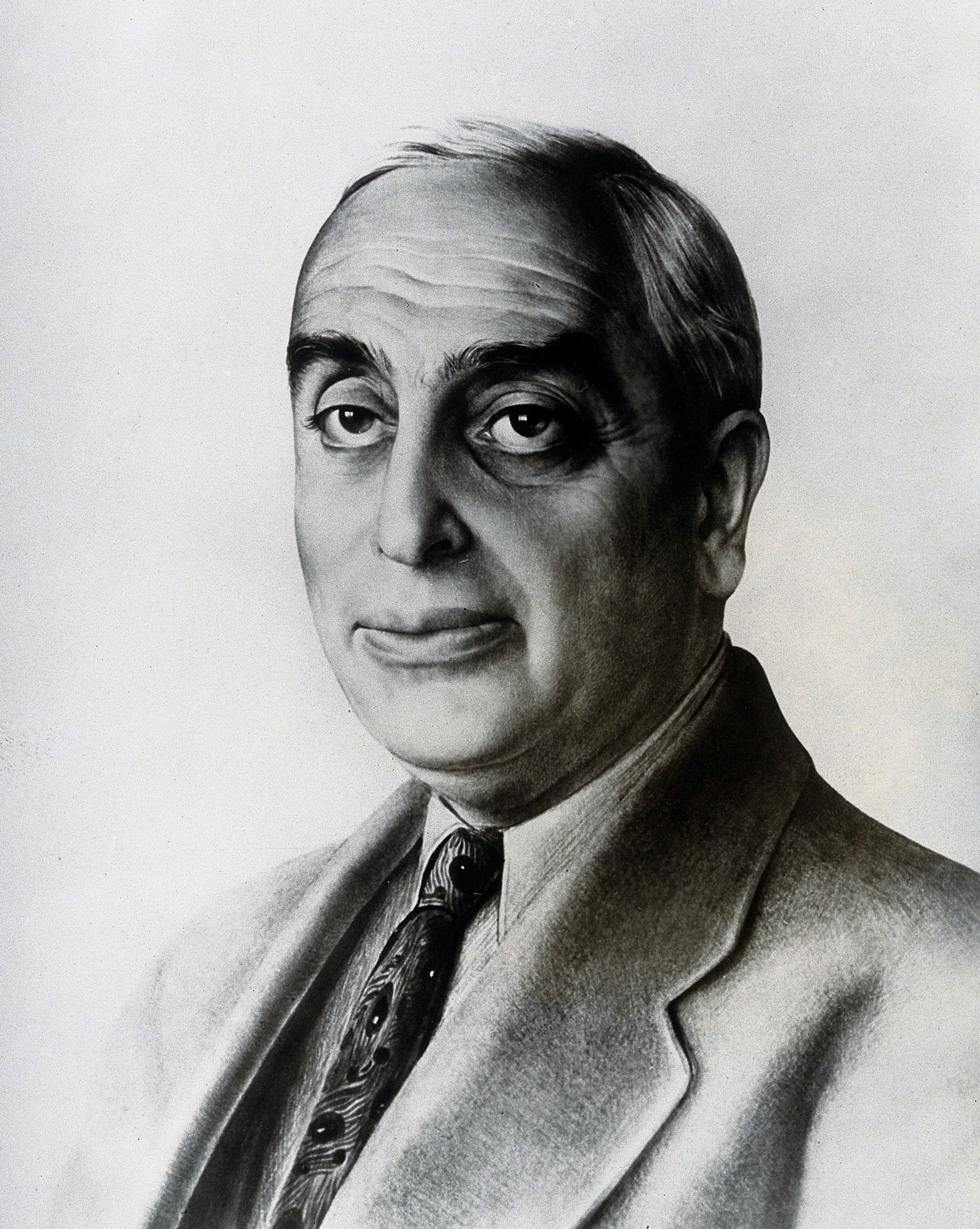
- 1940 portrait
- Born: 16 July 1877; Balatonboglár, Hungary
- Died: 6 December 1967 (aged 90)
- Known for: Schick test
- Awards: John Howland Award (1954)
- Scientific career
- Fields: Pediatrics
- Workplaces: Mount Sinai Hospital; Columbia University; Beth-El Hospital

Béla Schick (16 July 1877 – 6 December 1967) was a Hungarian-born American pediatrician. He is the founder of the Schick test. Bela Schick was born in Balatonboglár, Hungary, and brought up in Graz, Austria, where he attended medical school. In 1902, he joined the Medicine Faculty of the University of Vienna where he remained until 1923. Studying problems of immunity, he and Clemens von Pirquet coined the term 'allergy' as a clinical entity. His discovery of a test for susceptibility to diphtheria ("the Schick test") made him world famous. From 1923 he directed the Pediatric Department of Mount Sinai Hospital, New York City. From 1936 he was also professor at Columbia University. From 1950 to 1962 Schick headed the Pediatric Department of Beth-El Hospital, Brooklyn, NY. His later interests included the nutrition of the newborn and feeding problems in children.

Young Bela Schick quoted the Talmud: "The world is kept alive by the breath of children," to help persuade his father to allow him to pursue continued education in pediatrics, rather than to join the family grain merchant business in Graz, Austria. Schick became assistant at the Children's Clinic in Vienna, and later associate professor of pediatrics at Vienna University.

He emigrated to the United States, and in 1923 became pediatrician-in-chief at New York's Mount Sinai Hospital. He later (1936) was appointed clinical professor of pediatrics at Columbia University. Schick made important studies on scarlet fever, tuberculosis, and nutrition for infants but gained international renown for the Schick Test. This test determined susceptibility to diphtheria, and eventually led to the eradication of the childhood disease that attacked 100,000 Americans in 1927, leading to about 10,000 deaths.

A massive five-year campaign, coordinated by Dr. Schick, virtually eliminated diphtheria. As a part of the campaign, 85 million pieces of literature were distributed by Metropolitan Life Insurance Company. with an appeal to parents to "Save your child from diphtheria." These illustrated brochures were created by Gerta Ries, who (as Gerta Wiener) was commissioned over 75 years later to create the sculptured tribute to Dr. Schick for the Jewish-American Hall of Fame. A residential building is named after him on the Stony Brook University campus.

== See also ==
- Serum sickness
