= FGFBP1 =

Protein-coding gene in the species Homo sapiens

Identifiers
- Aliases: FGFBP1, FGF-BP, FGF-BP1, FGFBP, FGFBP-1, HBP17, fibroblast growth factor binding protein 1
- External IDs: OMIM: 607737; MGI: 1096350; HomoloGene: 3766; GeneCards: FGFBP1; OMA:FGFBP1 - orthologs

Gene location (Human)
| Chr. | Chromosome 4 (human) |
| Band | 4p15.32 | Start | 15,935,577 bp |
| Band | 4p15.32 | End | 15,938,740 bp |

Gene location (Mouse)
| Chr. | Chromosome 5 (mouse) |
| Band | 5|5 B3 | Start | 44,136,200 bp |
| Band | 5|5 B3 | End | 44,139,121 bp |
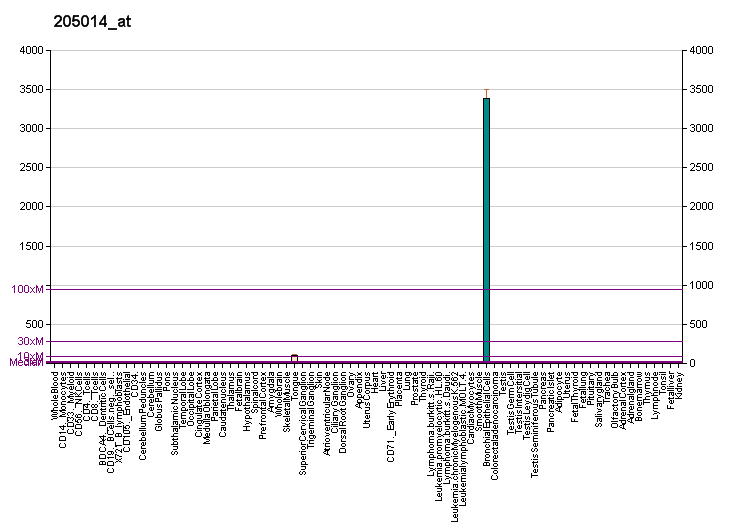
RNA expression pattern
| Bgee | Human / Mouse (ortholog); Top expressed in: mucosa of pharynx; gums; gingival epithelium; mucosa of esophagus; oral cavity; mucosa of transverse colon; human penis; vulva; skin of abdomen; skin of leg / Top expressed in: corneal stroma; mucous cell of stomach; skin of abdomen; epithelium of stomach; optic nerve; esophagus; umbilical cord; lip; pyloric antrum; left colon; More reference expression data |
| BioGPS | More reference expression data |
Gene ontology
| Molecular function | fibroblast growth factor binding; heparin binding; protein binding; growth factor binding |
| Cellular component | extracellular region; cell surface; plasma membrane; membrane; extracellular space |
| Biological process | positive regulation of fibroblast growth factor receptor signaling pathway; fibroblast growth factor receptor signaling pathway; signal transduction; positive regulation of cell population proliferation; negative regulation of cell population proliferation; cell-cell signaling; positive regulation of cell migration involved in sprouting angiogenesis; positive regulation of blood vessel endothelial cell proliferation involved in sprouting angiogenesis |
Sources:Amigo / QuickGO
Orthologs
| Species | Human | Mouse |
| Entrez | 9982 | 14181 |
| Ensembl | ENSG00000137440 | ENSMUSG00000048373 |
| UniProt | Q14512 | O70514 |
| RefSeq (mRNA) | NM_005130 | NM_001271616; NM_008009 |
| RefSeq (protein) | NP_005121 | NP_001258545; NP_032035 |
| Location (UCSC) | Chr 4: 15.94 – 15.94 Mb | Chr 5: 44.14 – 44.14 Mb |
| PubMed search |
- Wikidata
| View/Edit Human | View/Edit Mouse |

Fibroblast growth factor-binding protein 1 is a protein that in humans is encoded by the FGFBP1 gene.

FGFBP1, or HBP17, binds to both acidic FGF1 and basic FGF2 fibroblast growth factors in a reversible manner. It also binds to perlecan (HSPG2).[supplied by OMIM]

== Interactions ==
FGFBP1 has been shown to interaction with Perlecan.
