= Terminal dehydration =

Dehydration to the point of death

Terminal dehydration is dehydration to the point of death. Some scholars make a distinction between "terminal dehydration" and "termination by dehydration". Courts in the United States generally do not recognize prisoners as having a right to die by voluntary dehydration, since they view it as suicide.

== Progression ==
During terminal dehydration, the usual symptoms of dehydration, such as headache and leg cramps, can occur. Unlike many other suicide methods, it cannot be accomplished impulsively. However, a "point of no return" can eventually be reached at which, should it be desired to abort the terminal dehydration, rehydration cannot be accomplished through simple oral rehydration therapy; rather, it will require medical assistance such as intravenous therapy. Those who die by terminal dehydration typically lapse into unconsciousness before death, and may also experience delirium and altered serum sodium. Patients with edema tend to take longer to die of dehydration because of the excess fluid in their bodies. Dehydration has been known to cause a sense of "mild euphoria", provided no intravenous is used.

== Voluntary ==
Terminal dehydration (also known as voluntary death by dehydration or VDD) has been described as having substantial advantages over physician-assisted suicide with respect to self-determination, access, professional integrity, and social implications. Specifically, a patient has a right to refuse treatment and it would be a personal assault for someone to force water on a patient, but such is not the case if a doctor merely refuses to provide lethal medication. Some physicians believe it might have distinctive drawbacks as a humane means of voluntary death. One survey of hospice nurses in Oregon (where physician-assisted suicide is legal) found that nearly twice as many had cared for patients who chose voluntary refusal of food and fluids to hasten death as had cared for patients who chose physician-assisted suicide. They also rated fasting and dehydration as causing less suffering and pain and being more peaceful than physician-assisted suicide. Patients undergoing terminal dehydration can often feel no pain, as they are often given sedatives and care such as mouth rinses or sprays. There can be a fine line between terminal sedation that results in death by dehydration and euthanasia.

Studies have shown that for terminally ill patients who choose to die, deaths by terminal dehydration are generally peaceful, and not associated with suffering, when supplemented with adequate pain medication. All ages may feel sudden head rushes, dizziness, and loss of appetite, as well.

Some Buddhist monks in Japan historically practiced sokushinbutsu, a form of self-mummification which in part was achieved by the forgoing of all food and liquid until death.

== Involuntary ==
In the Netherlands debate has broken out about terminal dehydration, which is referred to as versterving. There have been accusations that involuntary dehydration takes place in nursing homes. Another doctoral thesis found no evidence of forced-upon "versterving" in nursing homes. There was, however, voiced vehement opposition considering assistance for those who voluntarily abstained from food and drink.

== See also ==
- Heat illness
- Hypovolemia
- Hypovolemic shock
- Fasting
- Medical food
- Terri Schiavo case
