= Paul Bargehr =

Austrian medical doctor and researcher

- Born: 18 March 1889; Thüringen, Vorarlberg
- Died: 31 December 1951 (aged 62); Gallspach
- Occupation: medical doctor
- Known for: Leprosy researches (pathology)

Paul Bargehr (18 March 1889 – 31 December 1951) was an Austrian medical doctor and writer mostly known for his work treating Hansen's disease (leprosy) in the Dutch East Indies (now Indonesia). Although the Japanese researcher Kensuke Mitsuda receives credit for first developing the modern lepromin test for distinguishing between different forms of Hansen's disease, Bargehr's work was responsible for coining and popularizing its current name.

== Life ==
Paul Bargehr was born on 18 March 1889 in Thüringen, Vorarlberg, in Austria-Hungary. He practised medicine in Innsbruck before travelling to the island of Java in the Dutch East Indies in 1920. While there, he studied and treated Hansen's disease, developing a modified form of intradermal leprolin test. He minced leproma with a large amount of M. leprae in water, then boiled it at 100°C for 20 minutes and added carbolic acid at a ratio of 1:200 with the water. He called the serum thus created "lepromin", which has remained the common name for such tests. He changed the name to avoid confusion with the tuberculin test for tuberculosis and also to clarify that the antigen was made from lepromatuous tissue. He was heavily decried, however, for exposing healthy subjects to the leprosy bacillus in his experiments. Bargehr returned to Austria in 1928, working at the Zeileis Institute in Gallspach, Upper Austria. He began his own Zeileis practice in Munich in 1929 but had to close it the next year owing to debt. He completed a manuscript entitled New Foundations of Physics (German: Neue Grundlagen der Physik) in 1945, but was unable to find a publisher. He died in Gallspach on 31 December 1951. His work and correspondence are held by the University of Innsbruck.

== Works ==
- "Die Selbstheilung der Lepra [Self-Healing of Leprosy]", Geneeskundig Tijdschrift voor Nederlandsch-Indië, no. 66, Jakarta: Lange & Co., pp. 603–609, 1926. (German)
- "Spezifische Hautreacktionen bei Lepra [Specific Skin Reaction in Leprosy]", Zeitschrift für Immunitätsforschung und Experimentalle Therapie, no. 47, Stuttgart: Fischer, pp. 529–531, 1926. (German)
- "Zur Leprafrage [On the Leprosy Question]", Münchener Medizinische Wochenschrift, vol. 1, no. 82, p. 56, 1935. (German)
