= Leishmanin skin test =

- Synonyms: Montenegro test

The leishmanin skin test (LST), also called Montenegro test, is an immunologic skin test that measures delayed-type hypersensitivity to Leishmania antigen. It can be used for diagnosis of cutaneous leishmaniasis.

It was first described by Brazilian physician João Montenegro in 1926.
