= Dharmendra antigen =

The Dharmendra antigen is a test widely used in India. The antigen is a suspension of de-fatted leprosy bacilli which has been extracted with chloroform-ether and killed, either by heat, or by other effective methods. This antigen was first reported by Dharmendra in 1941–42 and later standardized in 1979 by Sangupta et al.

Dharmendra's Lepromin suspension consists of 10 mg of the dried and de-fatted, bacillary powder, dissolved in 100 ml carbol saline solution. It is a revised form of the original Lepromin test developed in 1919 by Kensuke Mitsuda. The Dharmendra test allows to differentiate tuberculoid leprosy from lepromatous leprosy.
