= Fernandez reaction =

Clinical test for leprosy

The Fernandez reaction is a reaction that occurs to signal a positive result in the lepromin skin test for leprosy. The reaction occurs in the skin at the site of injection if the body possesses antibodies to the Dharmendra antigen, one of the antigens found in Mycobacterium leprae, the bacteria that causes leprosy. The reaction occurs via a delayed-type hypersensitivity mechanism. This reaction occurs within 48 hours of injection of lepromin and is seen in only tuberculoid forms of leprosy. This represents a delayed-type hypersensitivity reaction. In contrast, the Mitsuda reaction (delayed granulomatous lesion) occurs 3–4 weeks after injection of lepromin and is only seen in patients with the tuberculoid form of leprosy (not the lepromatous form, in which the body does not mount a strong response against the bacterium). In terms of mechanism of action and appearance, the reaction is similar to the tuberculin reaction of a positive Mantoux test for tuberculosis.
