= Malpighian layer =

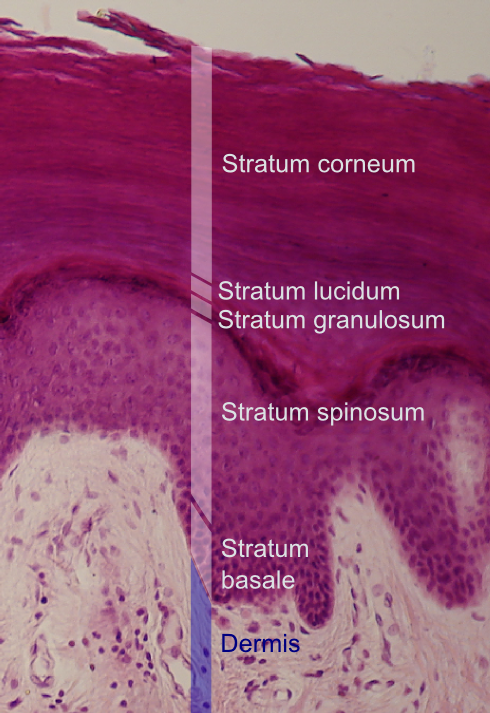
Histologic image of the epidermis with its layers named in white text.

The Malpighian layer (stratum mucosum or stratum malpighii) of the epidermis is generally defined as both the stratum basale (basal layer) and the thicker stratum spinosum (spinous layer/prickle cell layer) immediately above it as a single unit, although it is occasionally defined as the stratum basale specifically, or the stratum spinosum specifically.

It is named after the Italian biologist and physician Marcello Malpighi.

Basal cell carcinoma originates from the basal layer of the stratum malpighii.

This layer is where almost all of the mitotic activity in the epidermis occurs. The activity of these cells is increased by IL-1 (interleukin-1) and epidermal growth factor. The activity is decreased by transforming growth factor beta.
