= Corneometry =

Method for measuring skin hydration

- Purpose: measure of skin hydration

Corneometry is a widely practiced method for the measurement of skin hydration. It uses a capacitive sensor to measure the relative permittivity of upper skin layers. Because these depend on hydration of skin, the measured value is a measure for skin hydration.

The name corneometry is derived from the German trademark Corneometer. In 1979 the first commercial instrument for measuring skin hydration was sold under this name.
