= Transepidermal water loss =

Passage of water through the outermost layer of an animal or plant to the atmosphere

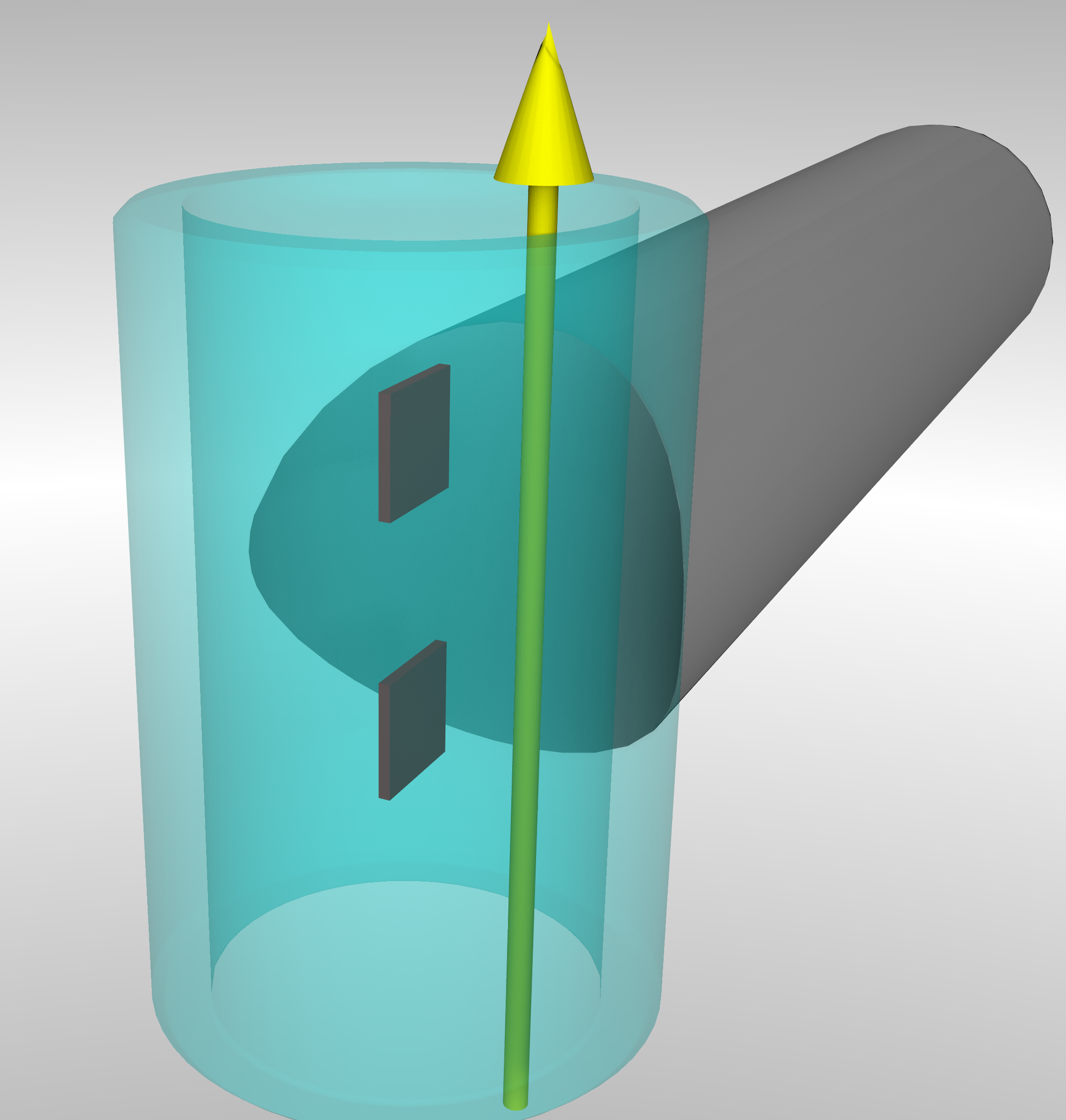
Principle of an instrument measuring transepidermal water loss. Water vapor is diffusing through the transparently shown cylinder. The yellow arrow symbolizes the diffusion direction. The two dark red square elements are two pairs of sensors each measuring relative humidity and temperature.

Transepidermal water loss (TEWL or TWL) is the loss of water that passes from inside a body (animal or plant) through the epidermis (that is, either the epidermal layer of animal skin or the epidermal layer of plants) to the surrounding atmosphere via diffusion and evaporation processes. TEWL in mammals is also known as insensible water loss (IWL), as it is a process over which organisms have little physiologic control and of which they are usually mostly unaware. Insensible loss of body water can threaten fluid balance; in humans, substantial dehydration sometimes occurs before a person realizes what is happening.

Measurements of TEWL may be useful for identifying skin damage caused by certain chemicals, physical insult (such as "tape stripping") or pathological conditions such as eczema, as rates of TEWL increase in proportion to the level of damage. However, TEWL is also affected by environmental factors such as humidity, temperature, the time of year (season variation) and the moisture content of the skin (hydration level). Therefore, care must be taken when interpreting the meaning of TEWL rates.

== Implications ==
=== Human health ===
From a clinical standpoint, TEWL measurements are of great importance in evaluating skin barrier functionality. Often normal rates of TEWL – from 2.3 g/(m^{2}h) to 44 g/(m^{2}h) – are compromised due to injury, infection and/or severe damage as in the case of burns causing rates over 50 or even over 100 g/m^{2}/h. Damage to the stratum corneum and superficial skin layers not only results in physical vulnerability, but also results in an excess rate of water loss. Therefore, dehydration, metabolic acidosis, and conditions such as anhydremia or concentration of the blood are often critical issues for healthcare providers to consider in the treatment of burn patients.

TEWL is of major concern in public health, considering the relatively high rate of burn incidence among communities in the developing world due to poor quality cooking stoves. Resources for burn care in local clinics are often scarce and depending on the affected surface area, TEWL is a major issue that can be overlooked. Furthermore, TEWL is also affected by variations in sweat gland activity, temperature, and metabolism. Therefore, transepidermal water loss becomes a significant factor in dehydration associated with several major disease states.

=== Botany and earth science ===
The amount of water that trees and other plants move from the ground to the atmosphere with TEWL is of interest in botany and earth science, as transpiration by plants is a substantial component of the water cycle on Earth.

== Acronym variation ==
Web corpus searches show that the acronym TEWL is about 40 times more common than TWL in reference to transepidermal water loss. A large advantage of TEWL is that it has higher specificity to that sense than does TWL, which has more alternative senses, including, most importantly, two other senses having to do with evaporation of body water: thermal work limit (TWL), which is the highest sustainable metabolic rate that well-hydrated, acclimatized individuals can maintain in a specific thermal environment, and total water loss (TWL), which in its physiologic sense is a superset of transepidermal water loss, because it also includes respiratory losses and urinary losses. Use of the acronym TEWL for transepidermal water loss avoids this ambiguity. As with many other acronyms in biology and medicine (for example, polymorphonuclear [PMN], bronchioloalveolar carcinoma [BAC], dolutegravir [DTG]), there is no law preventing the letters of the acronym from representing combining forms (trans- + epidermal) or other syllables irrespective of word boundaries.

For certain regions of human epidermis specific acronyms for TEWL are common. Water loss through finger and toe nails is called transonychial water loss, abbreviated TOWL.
