= Lepromin skin test =

Leprosy skin test

The lepromin skin test is used to determine what type of leprosy a person is infected with. It involves the injection of a standardized extract of the inactivated "leprosy bacillus" (Mycobacterium leprae or "Hansen's bacillus") under the skin. It is not recommended as a primary mode of diagnosis.

== Method ==
Positive reaction means: A) 10 mm (0.39 in) or more induration after 48hrs B) 5 mm (0.20 in) or above nodule after 21 days. An extract sample of inactivated Hansen's bacillus is injected just under the skin, usually on the forearm, so that a small lump pushes the skin upward. The lump indicates that the antigen has been injected at the correct depth. The injection site is labeled and examined at 48 hours and 21 days later to see if there is a reaction.

People with dermatitis or other skin irritations should have the test performed on an unaffected part of the body. When the antigen is injected, there may be a slight stinging or burning sensation. There may also be mild itching at the site of injection afterwards.

== Normal values ==
People who do not have clinical leprosy (Hansen's disease, or HD) may have little or no skin reaction to the antigen, or may have a strong reaction to it. This is because the lepromin test only tests for infection, not for ongoing disease. It is believed that most people exposed to Mycobacterium leprae are not infected and thus would not respond, or are infected but self-resolve or never manifest overt symptoms and therefore would respond to the lepromin skin test. Paradoxically, however, patients with lepromatous (Virchowian) HD, the most severe and transmissible form, have no skin reaction to the antigen. This is because an effective immune response to the bacterium is a result of a cellular immune response (T-cell mediated) rather than a humoral response (B-cell/antibody). Lepromatous HD, the more severe and disfiguring form is a result of the patient's immune response being mainly humoral in nature. Antibodies, the main effectors of a humoral response, are ineffective against M. leprae because of the unusually dense and waxy nature of the mycolic acid containing bacterial cell wall, and so the bacterium proliferates, causing the cutaneous disfigurements and peripheral neuropathologies characteristic of the disease. The reason there is little or no response to the lepromin test is that a positive response to lepromin is due to delayed type hypersensitivity that is T-cell mediated, and it is the failure of a robust T-cell response that results in the onset of lepromatous leprosy in the first place. However, given the severe nature of lepromatous leprosy, a skin test is unnecessary, and the definitive test, a biopsy, readily reveals the bacterium within lesions as well as the characteristic histopathology of HD. Moreover, lepromatous HD is typically diagnosed on clinical presentation alone.

By contrast, two forms of positive reactions are seen when tuberculoid or borderline cases of HD are assessed by the lepromin test. (There are three borderline diagnoses possible as well as the tuberculoid and lepromatous diagnoses in the Ridley-Jopling classification system. The severity of disease and thus assignment to one of the five diagnoses is related to the strength of the cell mediated immune response.) The Fernandez (early) reaction appears within two days and is roughly equivalent in nature and underlying mechanism to the response seen in tuberculosis patients reacting positively to the tuberculin test. Induration of 5mm or more with erythema (redness), or 10mm without, 48 hours post-injection are positive Fernandez reactions. Unlike the tuberculin test, however, another reaction occurs in lepromatous patients at the injection site 21 days post-injection, also appearing as induration and possible ulceration. This late positive reaction is known as the Mitsuda reaction. These reactions differ dependent on the type of lepromin antigen used.

There are two types of lepromin antigen in use that differ in the method of preparation. The Dharmendra antigen evokes a stronger early positive reaction than the Mitsuda antigen, which provokes a stronger late reaction. A strong Mitsuda reaction indicates a strong cell mediated immune response and a milder tuberculoid disease. Thus the strength of the reaction to lepromin can be used to help classify the extent of the disease as defined by within the Ridley-Jopling classification system. Strong positive Fernandez responses represent strong cell mediated responses that suppress the bacterium and result in tuberculoid HD. Progressively weaker responses are consistent with diagnoses moving through borderline diagnoses to lepromatous HD.

== Risks ==
There is an extremely small risk of an allergic reaction that may include itching and rarely hives.

== History ==
Aldo Castellani was the first to prepare a substance similar to lepromin while attempting to produce a leprosy vaccine. Kensuke Mitsuda worked with lepromin starting in 1916 and published the first paper on it in 1919 However, he retained Ernest Reinhold Rost's earlier name leprolin and his original idea was to find a test that distinguishes leprosy patients from non-leprosy persons. During his study, he found that the test results differed depending on the types of leprosy. He reported it at the Third International Leprosy Congress in France in 1923 but it received little attention. Working on Java in the Dutch East Indies, Paul Bargehr published his findings on a similar process in 1926, giving his modified serum the name lepromin. Mitsuda had stored his own materials in refrigeration and finally found Fumio Hayashi to continue his work. The Mitsuda Test was at last completed by Hayashi in 1933.

== Sources ==
- MedlinePlus Encyclopedia: Lepromin skin test
