= FGF7 =

Protein-coding gene in the species Homo sapiens

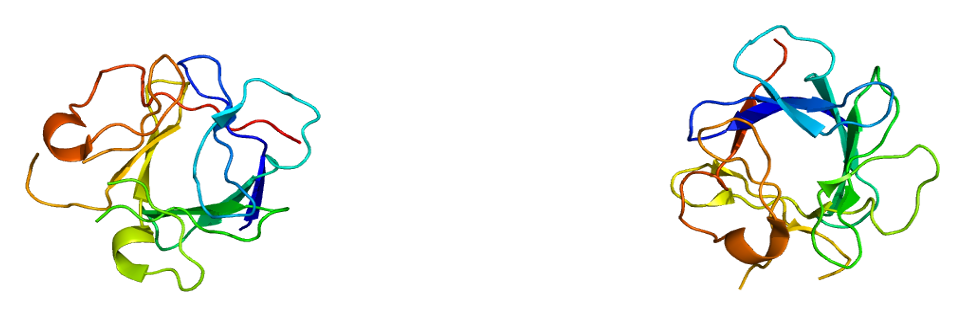

Identifiers
- Aliases: FGF7, HBGF-7, KGF, fibroblast growth factor 7
- External IDs: OMIM: 148180; MGI: 95521; GeneCards: FGF7

Gene location (Human)
| Chr. | Chromosome 15 (human) |
| Band | 15q21.2 | Start | 49,423,237 bp |
| Band | 15q21.2 | End | 49,488,775 bp |

Gene location (Mouse)
| Chr. | Chromosome 2 (mouse) |
| Band | 2|2 F1 | Start | 125,876,578 bp |
| Band | 2|2 F1 | End | 125,933,105 bp |
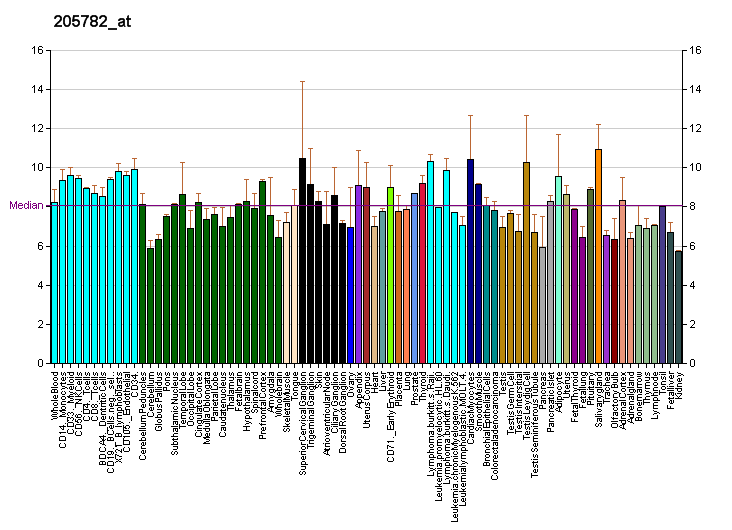
RNA expression pattern
| Bgee | Human / Mouse (ortholog); Top expressed in: Achilles tendon; stromal cell of endometrium; gallbladder; epithelium of colon; tibial nerve; canal of the cervix; left uterine tube; body of uterus; sural nerve; ectocervix / Top expressed in: stroma of bone marrow; calvaria; lobe of cerebellum; cerebellar vermis; endothelial cell of lymphatic vessel; intercostal muscle; left lung lobe; ankle; myotome; detrusor urinae muscle; More reference expression data |
| BioGPS | More reference expression data |
Gene ontology
| Molecular function | heparin binding; fibroblast growth factor receptor binding; protein binding; chemoattractant activity; growth factor activity; 1-phosphatidylinositol-3-kinase activity; protein tyrosine kinase activity; phosphatidylinositol-4,5-bisphosphate 3-kinase activity |
| Cellular component | Golgi apparatus; extracellular region |
| Biological process | actin cytoskeleton reorganization; mesenchymal cell proliferation; positive regulation of keratinocyte proliferation; positive regulation of epithelial cell proliferation involved in lung morphogenesis; secretion by lung epithelial cell involved in lung growth; positive regulation of epithelial cell proliferation; regulation of branching involved in salivary gland morphogenesis by mesenchymal-epithelial signaling; MAPK cascade; positive regulation of transcription, DNA-templated; fibroblast growth factor receptor signaling pathway; positive regulation of keratinocyte migration; protein localization to cell surface; response to wounding; positive regulation of cell population proliferation; epidermis development; positive regulation of peptidyl-tyrosine phosphorylation; hair follicle morphogenesis; positive chemotaxis; positive regulation of cell division; signal transduction; branching involved in salivary gland morphogenesis; phosphatidylinositol phosphate biosynthetic process; peptidyl-tyrosine phosphorylation; phosphatidylinositol-3-phosphate biosynthetic process; regulation of signaling receptor activity; positive regulation of protein kinase B signaling |
Sources:Amigo / QuickGO
Orthologs
| Databases | NCBI: entry; OMA: entry |
| Species | Human | Mouse |
| Entrez | 2252 | 14178 |
| Ensembl | ENSG00000140285 | ENSMUSG00000027208 |
| UniProt | P21781 | P36363 |
| RefSeq (mRNA) | NM_002009 | NM_008008 |
| RefSeq (protein) | NP_002000 | NP_032034 |
| Location (UCSC) | Chr 15: 49.42 – 49.49 Mb | Chr 2: 125.88 – 125.93 Mb |
| PubMed search |
- Wikidata
| View/Edit Human | View/Edit Mouse |

Keratinocyte growth factor is a protein that in humans is encoded by the FGF7 gene.

== Function ==
The protein encoded by this gene is a member of the fibroblast growth factor (FGF) family. FGF family members possess broad mitogenic and cell survival activities, and are involved in a variety of biological processes, including embryonic development, cell growth, morphogenesis, tissue repair, tumor growth and invasion. This protein is a potent epithelial cell-specific growth factor, whose mitogenic activity is predominantly exhibited in keratinocytes but not in fibroblasts and endothelial cells. Studies of mouse and rat homologs of this gene implicated roles in morphogenesis of epithelium, reepithelialization of wounds, hair development and early lung organogenesis.

== Interactions ==
FGF7 has been shown to interact with Perlecan.
