= IKZF1 =

Protein-coding gene in the species Homo sapiens

Identifiers
- Aliases: IKZF1, Hs.54452, IK1, IKAROS, LYF1, LyF-1, PPP1R92, PRO0758, ZNFN1A1, CVID13, IKAROS family zinc finger 1
- External IDs: OMIM: 603023; MGI: 1342540; GeneCards: IKZF1

Gene location (Human)
Chr.	Chromosome 7 (human)
Band	7p12.2	Start	50,304,068 bp
Band	7p12.2	End	50,405,101 bp

Gene location (Mouse)
Chr.	Chromosome 11 (mouse)
Band	11 A1|11 7.02 cM	Start	11,635,003 bp
Band	11 A1|11 7.02 cM	End	11,722,926 bp
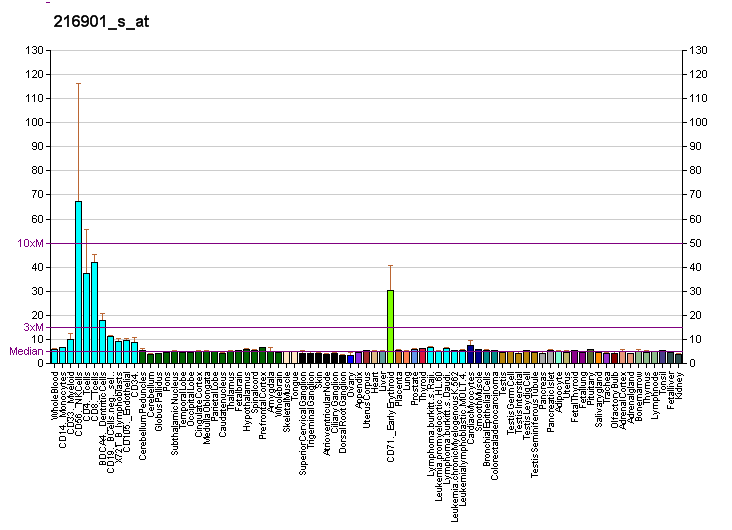

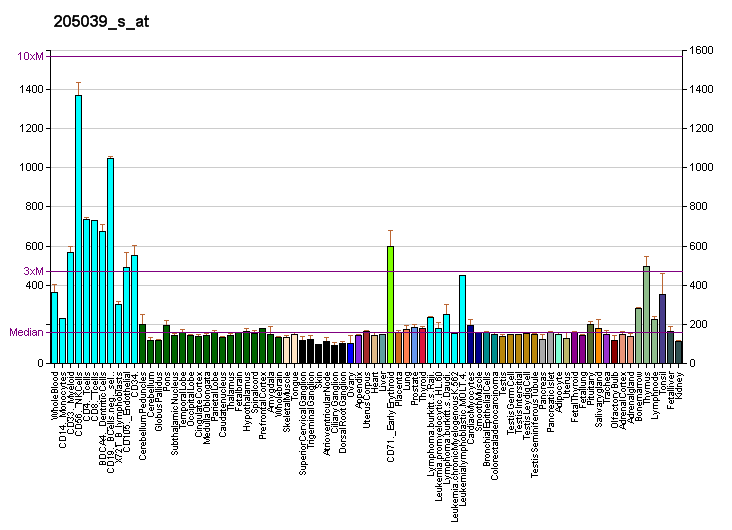
RNA expression pattern
Bgee	Human / Mouse (ortholog); Top expressed in: white blood cell; monocyte; bone marrow; trabecular bone; blood; granulocyte; bone marrow cell; lymph node; epithelium of nasopharynx; thymus / Top expressed in: thymus; granulocyte; blood; mesenteric lymph nodes; spleen; submandibular gland; stroma of bone marrow; subcutaneous adipose tissue; embryo; yolk sac; More reference expression data
BioGPS	More reference expression data
Gene ontology
Molecular function	DNA-binding transcription factor activity; DNA binding; protein binding; metal ion binding; nucleic acid binding; protein domain specific binding; DNA-binding transcription factor activity, RNA polymerase II-specific
Cellular component	cytoplasm; nucleus; nucleoplasm; protein-containing complex
Biological process	erythrocyte differentiation; cell cycle; multicellular organism development; mesoderm development; negative regulation of transcription, DNA-templated; regulation of transcription, DNA-templated; transcription, DNA-templated; positive regulation of transcription by RNA polymerase II; lymphocyte differentiation; protein heterooligomerization; chromatin organization
Sources:Amigo / QuickGO
Orthologs
Databases	NCBI: entry; OMA: entry
Species	Human	Mouse
Entrez	10320	22778
Ensembl	ENSG00000185811	ENSMUSG00000018654
UniProt	Q13422	Q03267
RefSeq (mRNA)	NM_001220765; NM_001220766; NM_001220767; NM_001220768; NM_001220769 NM_001220770; NM_001220771; NM_001220772; NM_001220773; NM_001220774; NM_001220775; NM_001220776; NM_001291837; NM_001291838; NM_001291839; NM_001291840; NM_001291841; NM_001291842; NM_001291843; NM_001291844; NM_001291845; NM_001291846; NM_001291847; NM_006060	NM_001025597; NM_001301863; NM_001301865; NM_001301866; NM_001301868 NM_009578
RefSeq (protein)	NP_001207694; NP_001207696; NP_001207697; NP_001207699; NP_001207700 NP_001278766; NP_001278767; NP_001278768; NP_001278769; NP_001278770; NP_001278771; NP_001278772; NP_001278773; NP_001278774; NP_001278775; NP_001278776; NP_006051	n/a
Location (UCSC)	Chr 7: 50.3 – 50.41 Mb	Chr 11: 11.64 – 11.72 Mb
PubMed search
- Wikidata
View/Edit Human	View/Edit Mouse

DNA-binding protein Ikaros also known as Ikaros family zinc finger protein 1 is a protein that in humans is encoded by the IKZF1 gene.

== Ikaros - transcription factor ==
Ikaros is a transcription factor that is encoded by the IKZF genes of the Ikaros family zinc finger group. Zinc finger is a small structural motif of protein that allows protein binding to DNA or RNA molecule that is characterized by the coordination of one or more zinc ions (Zn^{2+}) in order to stabilize the fold.

Ikaros displays crucial functions in the hematopoietic system and is a known regulator of immune cells development, mainly in early B cells, CD4+ T cells. Its dysfunction has been linked to the development of chronic lymphocytic leukemia. In particular, Ikaros has been found in recent years to be a major tumor suppressor involved in human B-cell acute lymphoblastic leukemia and that it also has a part in the differentiation and function of individual T helper cells.

Ikaros also has a role during the later stages of B cell development during VDJ recombination in switch class of the antibody isotypes and expression of the B cell receptor.

In Ikaros knockout mice, T cells but not B cells are generated late in mouse development due to late compensatory expression of the related gene Aiolos (IKZF3). Ikaros point mutant mice are embryonic lethal due to anemia; they have severe defects in terminal erythrocyte and granulocyte differentiation, and excessive macrophage formation. SNPs located near the 3' region of IKZF1 in humans have been linked to susceptibility to childhood acute lymphoblastic leukemia (ALL) as well as type 1 diabetes. The two effects appear to be in opposite directions, with the allele marking susceptibility to ALL protecting from T1D and vice versa.

Further evidence shows that Ikaros regulates the development of medullary thymic epithelial cells (mTECs). Conditional deletion of Ikzf1 in thymic epithelial cells by Foxn1-Cre in mice, results in the dysregulation of various mTEC subsets, including the loss of Aire+ mTECs. The loss of Aire (Autoimmune regulator) expressing mTECs also causes global loss of tissue restricted antigens (TRAs) and Aire-dependent mimetic cell populations, with the loss of TRAs eventually leading to breakdown of immune tolerance.

== Genes of the Ikaros Zinc Finger Family group ==
The Ikaros Zinc Finger (IkZF) family of transcription factors are known regulators of hematopoietic cell development and many immune cells including that of CD4^{+} T cells.

The IkZF family consists of five members: Ikaros (encoded by the gene Ikzf1), Helios (Ikzf2), Aiolos (Ikzf3), Eos (Ikzf4), and Pegasus (Ikzf5). These factors contain N-terminal zinc finger (ZF) domains, which are responsible for mediating direct interactions with DNA, and C-terminal ZFs, which facilitate homo- and heterodimerization between IkZF family members.

IKZF1 is upregulated in granulocytes, B cells, CD4 and CD8 T cells, and NK cells, and downregulated in erythroblasts, megakaryocytes and monocytes.

== Ikaros deficiency ==
The mutation in the IKZF1 gene can cause dysfunction of the Ikaros transcription factor. The dysfunction affects expression in B cells that can lead to deregulation of the BCR signaling during B cell development and is associated with B cell transformation. The deregulation then can result in low proliferation rate and increased apoptosis of the B cells. The deregulation may be related with lymphoproliferative disorders and different forms of leukemia.

== Interactions ==
IKZF1 has been shown to interact with:

- CTBP1,
- HDAC1,
- HDAC7A,
- Histone deacetylase 5,
- IKZF2,
- IKZF3,
- IKZF4,
- SIN3A,
- Cereblon
- SIN3B.
- GATA2
