= TASOR2 =

Protein-coding gene in the species Homo sapiens

Identifiers
- Aliases: TASOR2, C10orf18, bA318E3.2, family with sequence similarity 208 member B, transcription activation suppressor family member 2, FAM208B
- External IDs: MGI: 2145274; HomoloGene: 26435; GeneCards: TASOR2; OMA:TASOR2 - orthologs

Gene location (Human)
Chr.	Chromosome 10 (human)
Band	10p15.1	Start	5,684,731 bp
Band	10p15.1	End	5,763,740 bp

Gene location (Mouse)
Chr.	Chromosome 13 (mouse)
Band	13|13 A1	Start	3,616,035 bp
Band	13|13 A1	End	3,661,108 bp
RNA expression pattern
Bgee	Human / Mouse (ortholog); Top expressed in: secondary oocyte; sural nerve; Achilles tendon; tibia; epithelium of colon; corpus epididymis; epithelium of nasopharynx; tail of epididymis; tonsil; superficial temporal artery / Top expressed in: spermatid; secondary oocyte; genital tubercle; zygote; tail of embryo; epiblast; atrioventricular valve; primary oocyte; spermatocyte; abdominal wall; More reference expression data
BioGPS	n/a
Orthologs
Species	Human	Mouse
Entrez	54906	105203
Ensembl	ENSG00000108021	ENSMUSG00000033799
UniProt	Q5VWN6	Q5DTT3
RefSeq (mRNA)	NM_017782; NM_001321783; NM_001321784; NM_001321785; NM_001387328	NM_134063; NM_001360838
RefSeq (protein)	NP_001308712; NP_001308713; NP_001308714; NP_060252	NP_598824; NP_001347767
Location (UCSC)	Chr 10: 5.68 – 5.76 Mb	Chr 13: 3.62 – 3.66 Mb
PubMed search
- Wikidata
View/Edit Human	View/Edit Mouse

Protein TASOR 2 is a protein that in humans is encoded by the TASOR2 gene. The gene is also known as FAM208B and "chromosome 10 open reading frame 18" (c10orf18). FAM208B is expressed throughout the body however its function has not been established. FAM208b has been observed to be differentially regulated in various cancers and throughout development. While the exact role of the protein is yet to be established, the significant presence of the protein within humans and throughout the phylogenetic tree depicts a central importance of the gene in normal function.

== Gene ==
The gene is located on chromosome 10 at position 10p15.1. FAM208b is upstream of ankryn repeat and SOCS box containing 13 (ASB13), and downstream of the GDP dissociation inhibitor 2 (GDI2) and nuclear receptor binding factor 2 pseudogene 5 (NRBF2P5). ASBI13 and GDI2 are both found on the opposite strand of FAM208b, while NRBF2P5 is on the same strand.

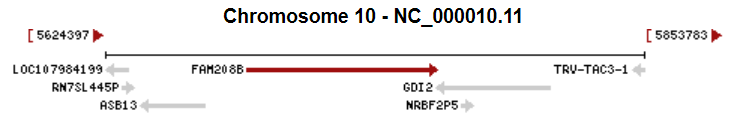
The gene neighborhood of FAM208b. GDI2 is upstream on the same strand, while NRBF2P5 is upstream on the reverse strand. ASB13 is directly downstream on the reverse strand.

== Homology and Evolution ==
=== Paralog ===
FAM208b has a single paralog, FAM208a. FAM208a is also known as "retinoblastoma-associated protein 140", "Transgene Activation Suppression Protein" (TASOR), "CTCL Tumor Antigen", and "chromosome 3 open reading frame 63" (c3orf63).

=== Orthologs ===
FAM208b is conserved only in vertebrates. Orthologs can be found in mammals, reptiles, and amphibians. Distant homologs, including orthologs of the paralog, FAM208a, are observed in bony fish and sharks.

=== Homologous Domains ===
FAM208b has highly conserved N- and C- termini and a less conserved central region. Three domains of unknown function (DUFs) are found within the protein, including one DUF 3699 and two DUF 3715. All three DUFs are conserved between species. DUF 3715 is found in the paralog of FAM208b.

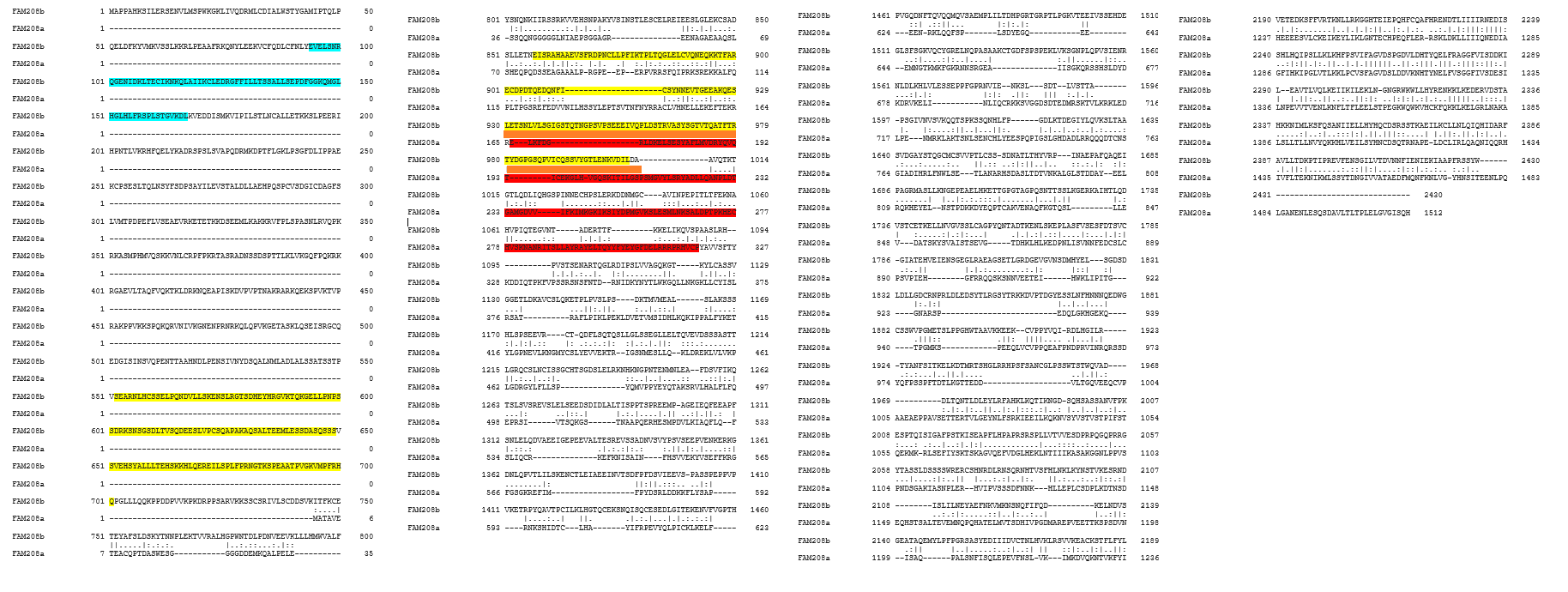
Alignment of FAM208b and its paralog FAM208a, highlighting identified domains of unknown function: DUF3699 in blue, DUF3715 of FAM208b in yellow, DUF3715 of FAM208a in red, and their overlap in orange.

=== Evolution ===
The change in amino acids over time of FAM208b indicates that it is a rapidly evolving gene. The presence of FAM208a but not FAM208b in bony fish and sharks but not FAM208b, indicates that the paralogs split about 325 million years ago.

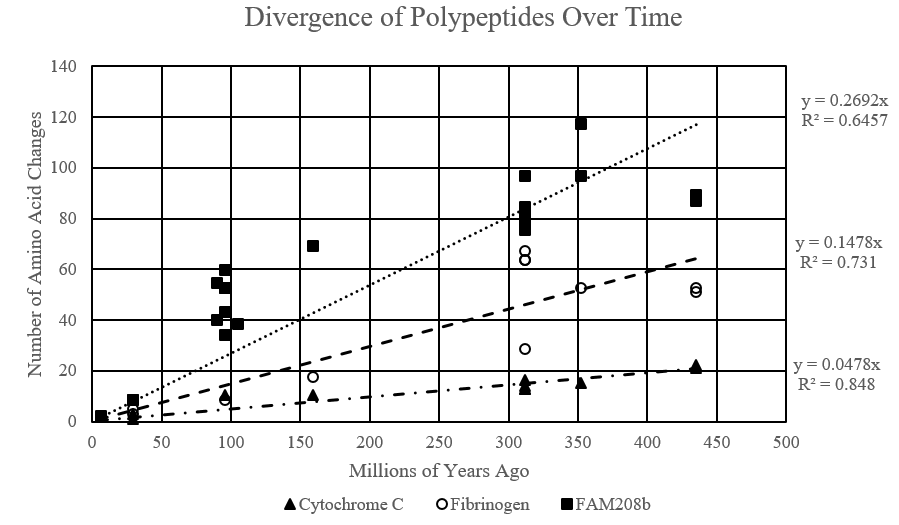
Relative divergence of FAM208b as compared to Fibrinogen, a rapidly evolving gene, and Cytochrome C, a slowly evolving gene. FAM208b is evolving very rapidly. This is represented as more changes in the amino acid sequence over time.

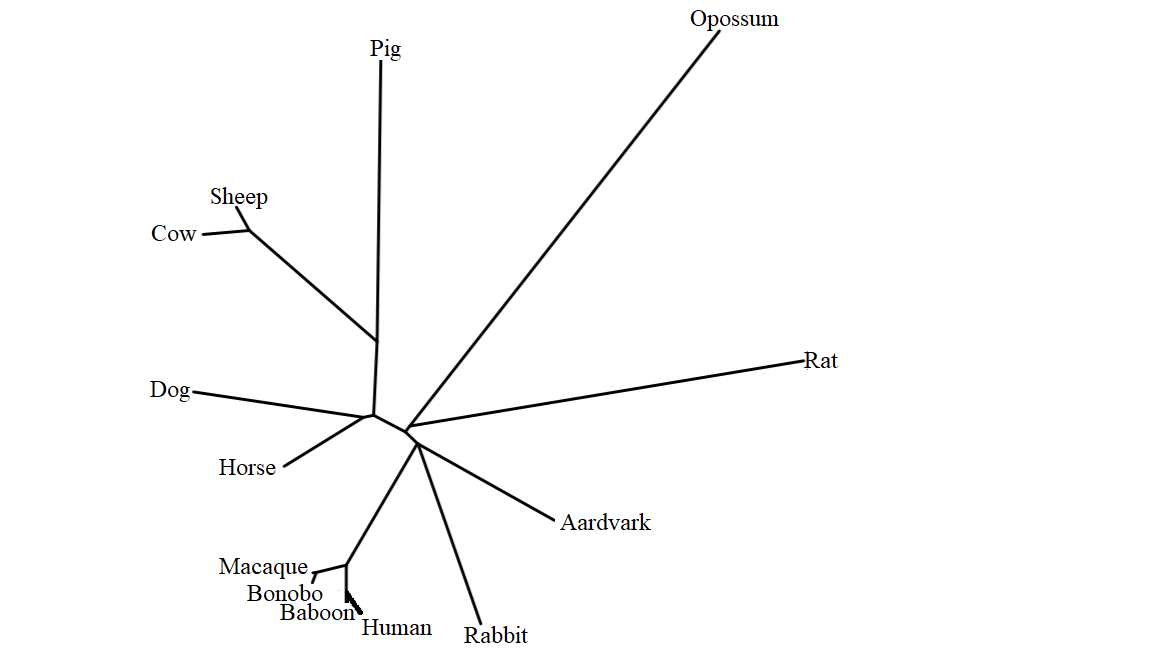
Phylogenetic tree depicting predicted evolutionary relationships based on FAM208b sequence similarity from select mammals.

== Transcription ==
=== Promoter ===
Two promoter regions for FAM208b can be observed. The earlier promoter region is regulated by numerous transcription factors. The promoter contains binding sites for Ikaros2, Nuclear Factor Y, and at least three binding sites for Pleomorphic adenoma gene 1.

The second promoter region is found within the first intron and encodes a slightly shorter mRNA. This promoter contains multiple binding sites for the FOXP1 transcription factor.

=== mRNA ===
The mRNA of the most common peptide (variant x2) is 8699 nucleotides long and includes 22 exons.

==== Binding Proteins ====
The 5' UTR is bound by the RNA binding proteins RBMX1, FUS, SFRS1, ACO1, and NONO. The 3' UTR is bound by EIF4B, A2BP1, and ZFP36. A single non-coding variant of FAM208b is transcribed. This sequence is partially complementary to the human gene PCNX1.

=== Transcript Variants ===
A total of 20 transcript variants of FAM208b, including one non-coding RNA have been observed. While multiple splice variants are present, 18 exons, composing for 7089 base pairs that code for 2331 amino acids, are present in all coding variants. This constitutes approximately 82.1% of the most common transcript variant (X2), and 95.6% of its polypeptide product. The most commonly skipped exon is Exon 12 (position ch10: 5735304-5735546). Multiple variants have alternative transcription start sites, indicative of an internal promoter sequence.

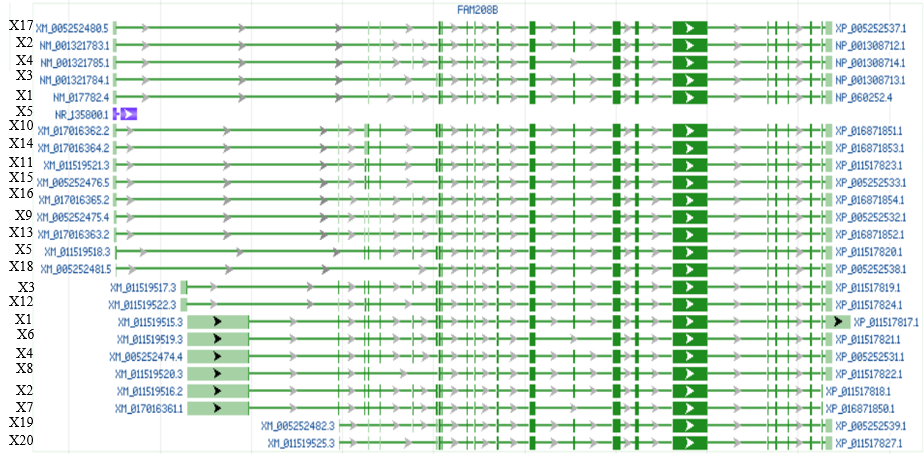
List of all observed FAM208b transcript variants. Exons are thick boxes, introns are thin lines. The NCBI accession number for each variant is given on the right.

== Protein ==
=== Biochemistry ===
The primary isoform of FAM208b consists of 2430 amino acids. The total molecular weight is 268.86 kD. FAM208b has an isoelectric point of 5.72. FAM208b has an instability index of 53.64, making it a relatively unstable protein in the unphosphorylated form.

=== Primary Structure ===
FAM208b has a unique amino acid composition. An above-average proportion of serine residues are observed (11.1%). This indicates a potential role in intracellular signaling.

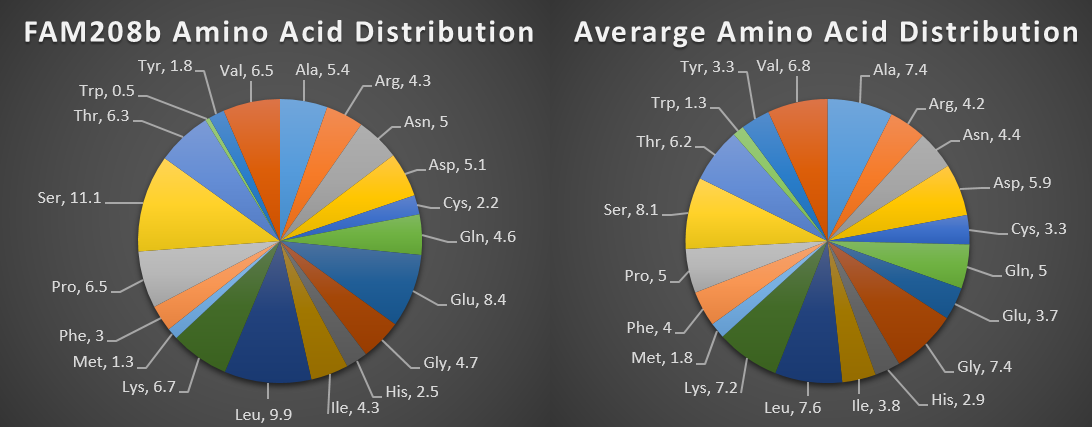
Comparison of the amino acid composition of FAM208b and the total distribution of amino acids in all proteins. FAM208b has an above average composition of serine residues.

=== Secondary Structure ===
FAM208b is predicted to have multiple alpha-helical domains. It is predicted that 25% of the protein forms alpha-helices, 15% forms beta-strands, and 60% is random coil. The various DUF domains are predicted to have variable structure. DUF3699 consists of two helices and four beta-strands. The N-terminal DUF3715 appears to form a stretch of random coil, while the C-terminal DUF3715 has two helices and four beta-strands.

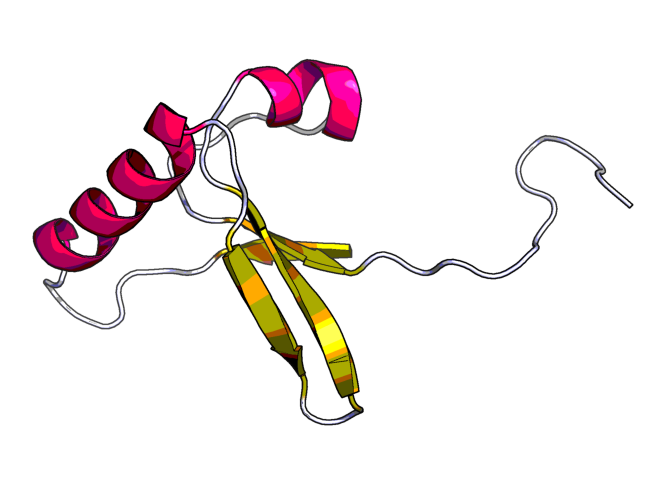
Predicted structure of FAM208b's DUF3699 domain.

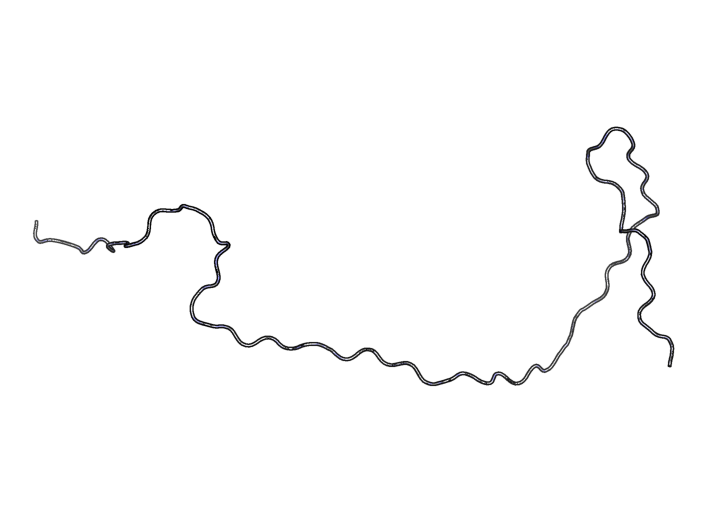
Predicted structure of FAM208b's first DUF3715 domain. It appears to be entirely disordered.

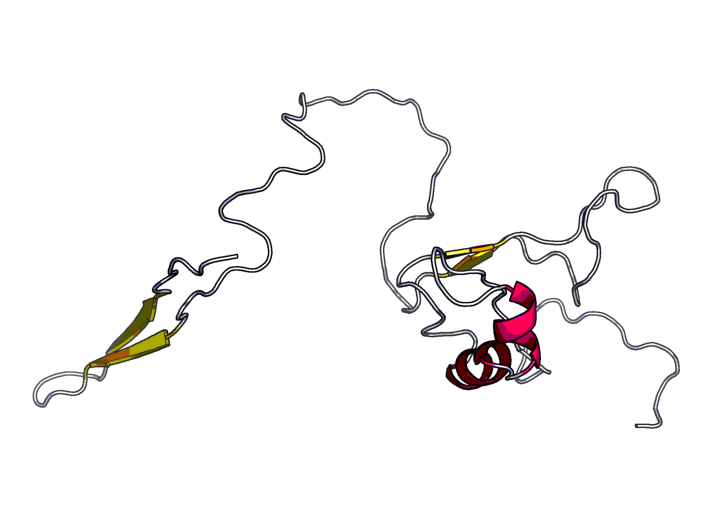
Predicted Structure of FAM208b's second DUF3715 domain.

=== Tertiary Structure ===
A tertiary structure has not yet been confirmed by X-ray crystallography. Predictions of tertiary structure indicate a modular protein, composed of three modules connected by random coil.

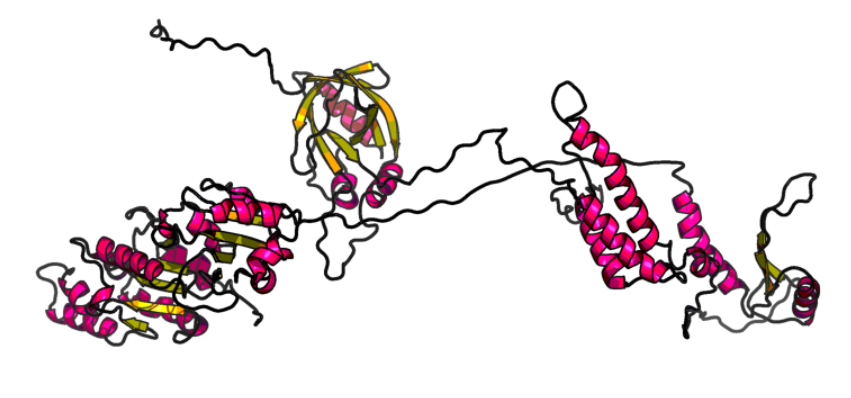
3D structure prediction of FAM208b.

=== Post-Translational Modifications ===
==== Phosphorylation ====
FAM208b has 13 experimentally confirmed phosphorylation sites on serine residues. The high serine content of FAM208b suggests a role in intracellular signaling.

==== SUMOylation ====
FAM208b has potential for SUMOylation SUMOylation has been observed to play a role in nuclear transport, which would aid FAM208b's localization prediction.

==== Glycosylation ====
FAM208b is predicted to be an intracellular protein, indicating that it is not glycosylated.

=== SubCellular Location ===
FAM208b is predicted to be localized to the cytosol or nucleus. The peptide sequence lacks a signal sequence either at the N-terminus or internally. No transmembrane domains have been observed or predicted, indicating that FAM208b is not secreted or found in the cell membrane, and is very likely to be intracellular. A Nuclear Localization Signal is observed at amino acids 393-403. The NLS is highly conserved in mammals, birds, and reptiles.

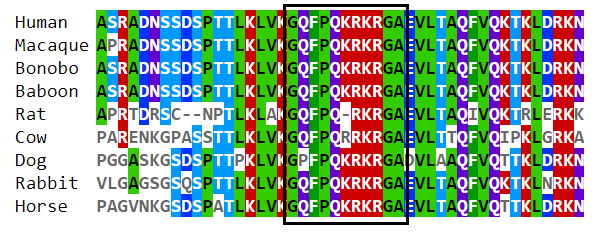
Multiple Sequence Alignment between various mammalian groups of the Nuclear Localization Signal of FAM208b, indicating that the protein is likely transported to the cell nucleus.

== Clinical Significance ==
=== Development ===
FAM208b expression is observed to decrease over the course of development. Peak expression is observed in the blastocyst. A sharp decline in expression is observed at the fetal stage, after which expression is maintained at constant levels through adulthood.

=== Pathology ===
FAM208b has been observed to be correlated in a variety of cancers. The locus of FAM208b (10p15.1) was identified as an aberration site present in translocation-positive Follicular lymphoma but not Nodal Marginal Zone Lymphoma. FAM208b has also been identified as being upregulated significantly and prominently in Non-Hodgkin lymphoma cells. FAM208b has been identified as a hub gene of Stage IV colorectal cancer. A fusion of FAM208b and PLEKHB1 has been validated as candidate for fusion of chromosomes 10 and 11 in Donor Cell Leukemia. FAM208b has also been separately observed to be differentially expressed in a variety of cancers. A decrease in transcription of FAM208b has been observed in adrenal cancer, bladder cancer, breast cancer, gastrointestinal cancer, glial cancer, kidney cancer, lymph cancer, skin cancer, muscle cancer, and uterine cancer. An increase in transcription of FAM208b has been observed in cervical cancer, leukemia, liver cancer, lung cancer, and prostate cancer.

FAM208b has also been found to be expressed at higher levels in Acute Macular Degeneration.

FAM208b has been observed to be downregulated in bronchial epithelial cells infected by respiratory syncytial virus and has been postulated as a biosignature of the infection.
