= QSER1 =

Protein-coding gene in the species Homo sapiens

Identifiers
- Aliases: QSER1, glutamine and serine rich 1
- External IDs: MGI: 2138986; HomoloGene: 11710; GeneCards: QSER1; OMA:QSER1 - orthologs

Gene location (Human)
Chr.	Chromosome 11 (human)
Band	11p13	Start	32,892,811 bp
Band	11p13	End	32,993,316 bp

Gene location (Mouse)
Chr.	Chromosome 2 (mouse)
Band	2|2 E2	Start	104,585,140 bp
Band	2|2 E2	End	104,647,105 bp
RNA expression pattern
Bgee	Human / Mouse (ortholog); Top expressed in: caput epididymis; corpus epididymis; tibia; tail of epididymis; germinal epithelium; Skeletal muscle tissue of biceps brachii; superior surface of tongue; parietal pleura; skin of hip; visceral pleura / Top expressed in: external carotid artery; internal carotid artery; triceps brachii muscle; tail of embryo; vastus lateralis muscle; genital tubercle; secondary oocyte; zygote; muscle of thigh; primary oocyte; More reference expression data
BioGPS	n/a
Orthologs
Species	Human	Mouse
Entrez	79832	99003
Ensembl	ENSG00000060749	ENSMUSG00000074994
UniProt	Q2KHR3	A0A338P6K9
RefSeq (mRNA)	NM_001076786; NM_024774	NM_001123327
RefSeq (protein)	NP_001070254	NP_001116799
Location (UCSC)	Chr 11: 32.89 – 32.99 Mb	Chr 2: 104.59 – 104.65 Mb
PubMed search
- Wikidata
View/Edit Human	View/Edit Mouse

Glutamine Serine Rich Protein 1 or QSER1 is a protein encoded by the QSER1 gene.

QSER1 protein is a DNA methylation regulator. QSER1 has one alias, FLJ21924.

== Gene ==
=== Location ===
The QSER1 gene is found on the short arm of chromosome 11 (11p13), beginning at 32,914,792 bp and ending at 33,001,816 bp. It is 87,024 bp in length. It is located between the genes DEPDC7 and PRRG4 and is 500,000 bp downstream from the Wilms Tumor 1 gene (WT1), which is implicated in multiple pathologies.

=== Homology ===
==== Orthologs ====
QSER1 is highly conserved in most species of the clade Chordata. Orthologs have been found in primates, birds, reptiles, amphibians, and fish as far back as the coelacanth, which diverged 414.9 million years ago.

==== Paralogs ====
QSER1 has one paralog in humans, Proline-rich 12, or PRR12. PRR12 is found on chromosome 9 at 9q13.33, which does not have known function. PRR12 is found in most chordate species as far back as the coelacanth. The duplication event likely occurred sometime in the chordate lineage near the divergence of the coelacanth. Both PRR12 and QSER1 contain the conserved DUF4211 domain near the 3' ends of the genes.

== mRNA ==
=== Promoter and transcription factors ===
The promoter region for QSER1 is 683 bp in length and is found on chromosome 11 between 32,914,224 bp and 32,914,906. There is some overlap between the promoter region and the 5' UTR of QSER1. Predicted transcription factors with conservation include (but are not limited to) EGR1, p53, E2F3, E2F4, PLAG1, NeuroD2, Myf5, IKZF1, SMAD3, KRAB, MZF1, and c-Myb.

=== Expression ===
==== Normal expression ====
Expression of QSER1 is seen at levels lower than 50% in many tissues. However, notable expression is seen in skeletal muscle, the appendix, trigeminal ganglia, cerebellum peduncles, pons, spinal cord, ciliary ganglion, globus pallidus, subthalamic nucleus, dorsal root ganglion, fetal liver, adrenal gland, ovary, uterus corpus, cardiac myocytes, the atrioventricular node, skin, pituitary gland, tongue, early erythroid progenitors, and tonsil.

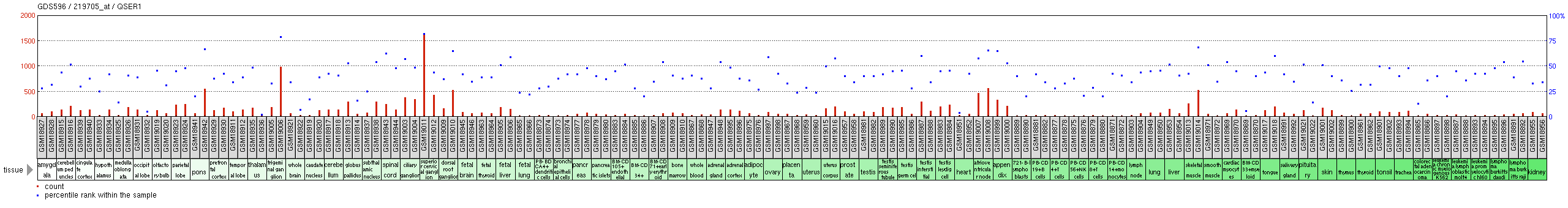
NCBI GeoProfiles expression data for QSER1

==== Differential expression ====
A notable decrease in QSER1 expression has been noted in renal mesangial cells in response to treatment with 25 mM glucose. This condition was studied as differential expression of genes involved in cell cycle regulation had been noted in these cells in response to high glucose levels seen with diabetes mellitus. A different study noted overexpression of QSER1 in pathological cardiomyopathy. This condition is associated with altered expression of genes involved in immune responses, signaling, cell growth, and proliferation as well as infiltration of B lymphocytes.

Differential expression of QSER1 is seen in multiple cancer conditions. Overexpression of QSER1 was noted in Burkitt's Lymphoma. QSER1 expression also increases with increasing Gleason score (more advanced stages) of prostate cancer. In a study on breast cancer response to paclitaxel and fluorouracil‐doxorubicin‐cyclophosphamide chemotherapy, it was noted that breast cancer lines with higher levels of QSER1 were more likely to respond to treatment than those with underexpression of QSER1. Greater expression of QSER1 was also noted in mammary epithelial cells of immortalized cell lines than in mammary epithelial cells from cell lines with finite lifespan.

=== 3' UTR ===
Over 20 stem loops are predicted in the 3' UTR of QSER1. 16 stem loops are found within the first 800 bp of 3' UTR. The 3' UTR is almost entirely conserved in mammals with less conservation seen in other organisms.

== Protein ==
=== General properties ===
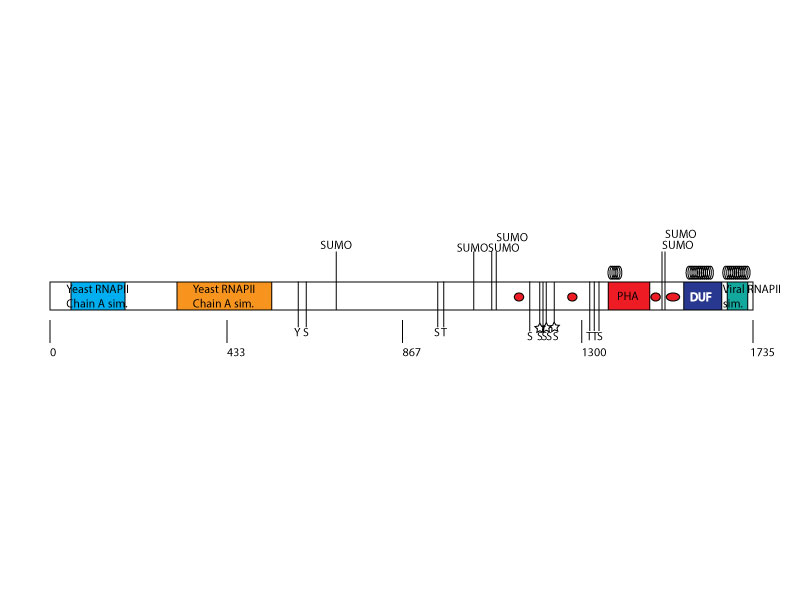
QSER1 protein overview

QSER1 protein is 1735 amino acids in length. The composition of the peptide is significantly high in serine and glutamine: 14.7% serine residues and 8.9% glutamine.

=== Conservation ===
QSER1 protein is highly conserved in chordate species. The table below shows information on the protein orthologs.

Tree of QSER1 Orthologs

Genus and species name	Common name	Protein accession number	Sequence Identity to human protein
Homo sapiens	Humans	NP_001070254.1	
Pan troglodytes	Chimpanzee	XP_508354.3	99%
Macaca mulatta	Rhesus macaque	NP_001244647.1	98%
Callithris jacchus	Marmoset	XP_002755192.1	96%
Ailuropoda melanoleuca	Giant panda	XP_002917539.1	90%
Loxodonta africana	Elephant	XP_003412344.1	88%
Mus musculus	Mouse	NP_001116799.1	81%
Monodelphis domestica	Opossum	XP_001368629.1	71%
Ornithorhynchus anatinus	Platypus	XP_001506659.2	75%
Taeniopygia guttata	Zebra finch	XP_002195876.1	69%
Gallus gallus	Chicken	NP_001186343.1	69%
Anolis carolinensis	Carolina anole (lizard)	XP_003214747.1	62%
Takifugu rubripes	Japanese pufferfish	XP_003977915.1	48%
Latimeria chalumnae	Coelacanth	N/A	62%

=== Domains and motifs ===
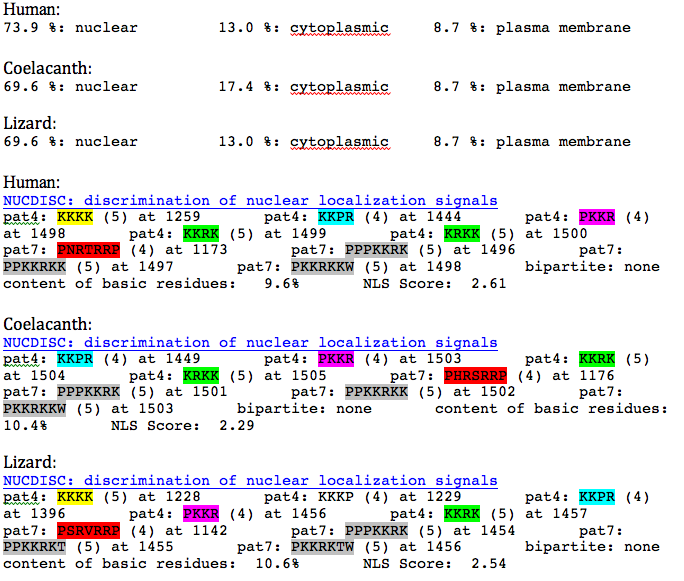
PSORT prediction of conserved nuclear localization and nuclear localization signals in QSER1 protein

QSER1 protein contains two high conserved domains found not only in QSER1 but also in other protein products. These include the PHA02939 domain from amino acid 1380-1440 and the DUF4211 domain from amino acid 1522-1642. Nuclear localization was predicted by pSORT. This property was conserved from the human QSER1 to the coelacanth QSER1. Multiple conserved nuclear localization signals were also predicted within the QSER1 protein by pSORT.

=== Structure ===
Predictions of the QSER1 protein structure indicate that the protein contains many alpha helices. NCBI cBLAST predicted structural similarity between the QSER1 protein and the Schizosaccharomyces pombe (fission yeast) RNA Polymerase II A chain. The two regions of similarity occur between amino acids 56-194 and 322-546. This first region (56-194) is a regulatory region in both the human and yeast RNA Polymerase II containing multiple repeats of the sequence YSPTSPSYS. Phosphorylation of serine residues in this region regulates progression through the steps of gene transcription. A 3D structure was provided for this region. The structurally similar region is on the exterior of the protein molecule and forms part of the DNA binding cleft.

Further structural similarity to a viral RNA Polymerase binding protein was predicted by Phyre2. This structure is found at the very end of the protein between amino acids 1671-1735. The structure has a long region of alpha helices that were also predicted by SDSC Biology Workbench PELE. An image of the structurally similar region and sequence alignment is shown on the right. Regions before the identified structurally similar domain show two other alpha helices predicted with high confidence.

=== Post translational modifications ===
==== Phosphorylation ====
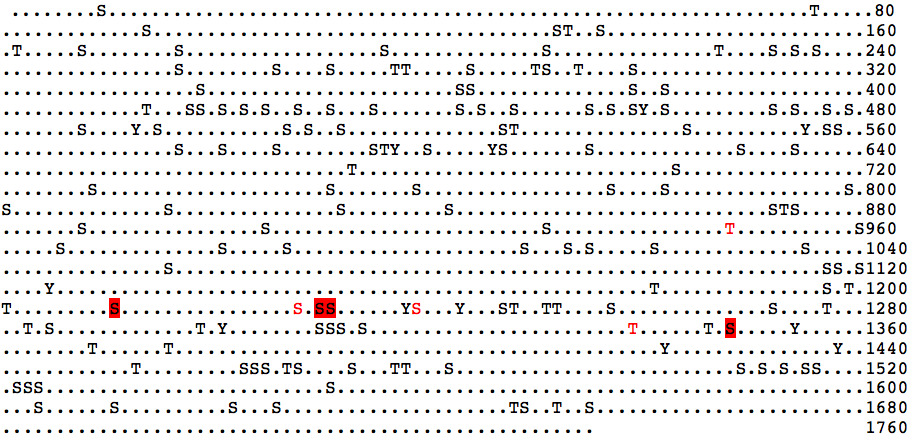
ExPASy NetPhos Predicted Phosphorylation Sites

There are 12 confirmed phosphorylation sites on the QSER1 protein. Eight are phosphoserines, one phosphotyrosine, and three phosphothreonines. Three of these sites have been shown to be phosphorylated by ATM and ATR in response in DNA damage. 123 other possible phosphorylation sites have been predicted using the ExPASy NetPhos tool.

==== SUMOylation ====
Interaction of QSER1 protein with SUMO has been noted in multiple proteome-wide studies. Predicted SUMOylation sites have been found in QSER1 protein. Highly conserved SUMOylation sites occur with the sequence MKMD at amino acid 794, VKIE at 1057, VKTG at 1145, LKSG at 1157, VKQP at 1487, and VKAE at 1492 .

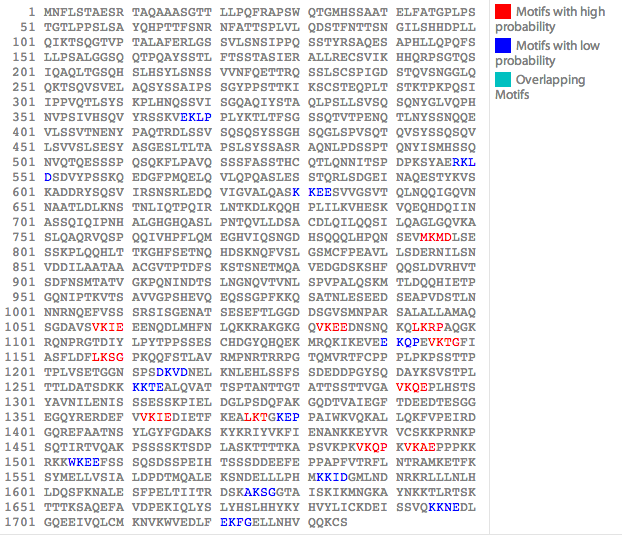
Predicted SUMOylation Sites in QSER1 protein

=== Interactions ===
==== ATM/ATR ====
Phosphorylation of QSER1 at three serine residues, S1228, S1231, and S1239, by ATM and ATR in response to DNA damage was found in a proteome-wide study.

==== SUMO ====
Interaction of QSER1 with SUMO has been confirmed in multiple studies. The role of SUMOylation in QSER1 function is unclear. However, there may be a connection between QSER1 and SUMO in response to endoplasmic reticulum stress (often caused by accumulation of misfolded proteins). In a study on ER stress, QSER1 was tagged as an ER stress response gene with altered expression. Further, in a study on SUMOylation in response to accumulated misfolded proteins and ER stress found QSER1 to be a SUMO interactant in this situation. Any connection between these two activities is unstudied and unconfirmed.

==== RNA polymerase II ====
Direct interaction of QSER1 with RNA polymerase II was found in a study performed by Moller, et al. Interaction was shown to occur with the DNA-directed RNA polymerase II subunit, RPB1, of RNA polymerase II during both mitosis and interphase. Colocalization/interaction of QSER1 was shown to the regulatory region of RPB1 with 52 heptapeptide (YSPTSPSYS) repeats.

==== NANOG and TET1 ====
Interaction between homeobox protein NANOG and Tet methylcytosine dioxygenase 1 (TET1) has been shown to be important in establishing pluripotency during the generation of induced pluripotent stem cells. QSER1 protein was shown to interact with both NANOG and TET1.

==== Ubiquitin ====
QSER1 was found to interact with ubiquitin in two proteome-wide substrate studies. Specific details about this interaction have not been studied.

== Pathology ==
Altered expression of QSER1 is noted in pathological cardiomyopathy, Burkitt's Lymphoma, prostate cancer, and some breast cancers mentioned above. NCBI AceView lists multiple mutations associated with other pathologies including an eight base pair and 13 base pair deletion in QSER1 associated with leiomyosarcoma of the uterus, and 57 base pair difference in a neuroblastoma. Also listed are multiple splice variants with truncated 5' and/or 3' ends often noted in cancerous conditions. Further, according to the NCBI OMIM database, multiple pathologies are associated with alterations in the 11p13 region and therefore may implicate QSER1. These include Exudative Vitreoretinopathy 3, Familial Candidiasis 3, Centralopathic Epilepsy, and Autosomal Recessive Deafness 51. QSER1 was also noted as a susceptibility gene for Parkinson's disease.
