= Proline-rich 12 =

Protein-coding gene in the species Homo sapiens

PRR12

Identifiers
- Aliases: PRR12, KIAA1205, Proline-rich 12, proline rich 12, NOC
- External IDs: OMIM: 616633; MGI: 2679002; GeneCards: PRR12

Gene location (Human)
Chr.	Chromosome 19 (human)
Band	19q13.33	Start	49,591,182 bp
Band	19q13.33	End	49,626,439 bp

Gene location (Mouse)
Chr.	Chromosome 7 (mouse)
Band	7|7 B3	Start	44,676,987 bp
Band	7|7 B3	End	44,702,305 bp
RNA expression pattern
Bgee	Human / Mouse (ortholog); Top expressed in: cardia; nipple; ventral tegmental area; vena cava; right hemisphere of cerebellum; pylorus; renal medulla; sural nerve; inferior ganglion of vagus nerve; cardiac muscle tissue of right atrium / Top expressed in: internal carotid artery; dorsomedial hypothalamic nucleus; external carotid artery; habenula; subiculum; otic vesicle; dentate gyrus of hippocampal formation granule cell; atrium; nucleus of stria terminalis; genital tubercle; More reference expression data
BioGPS	n/a
Orthologs
Databases	NCBI: entry; OMA: entry
Species	Human	Mouse
Entrez	57479	233210
Ensembl	ENSG00000126464	ENSMUSG00000046574
UniProt	Q9ULL5	E9PYL2
RefSeq (mRNA)	NM_020719	NM_175022
RefSeq (protein)	NP_065770	NP_778187
Location (UCSC)	Chr 19: 49.59 – 49.63 Mb	Chr 7: 44.68 – 44.7 Mb
PubMed search
- Wikidata
View/Edit Human	View/Edit Mouse

Proline-rich 12 (PRR12) is a protein of unknown function encoded by the gene PRR12.

== Gene ==
The Homo sapiens PRR12 gene is 34,785 base pairs long, contains 14 exons, and is located on chromosome 19 at 19q13.33. Known aliases for PRR12 include "proline rich 12" and KIAA1205. Within its gene neighborhood, PRR12 is flanked by PRRG2 and SCAF1 on the sense strand and RRAS and NOSIP on the antisense strand. Nitric oxide synthase interacting protein, NOSIP, regulates the activity and localization of nitric oxide synthase (endothelial and neuronal), controlling nitric oxide production. Proline rich Gla, PRRG2, has a Gla domain which binds hyaluronan and is associated with proteins present in the extracellular matrix involved with cell adhesion and cell migration. Ras-related protein R-Ras, RRAS, belongs to the Ras family and is involved in the organization of actin filaments within the cytoskeleton. SR-Related CTD-Associated Factor 1, SCAF1, is thought to be involved in the splicing of precursor mRNA.

Location of PRR12 on chromosome 19

PRR12 gene neighborhood

Promoter

The promoter region of PRR12 was predicted using ElDorado at Genomatix. The region starts at position 50094408 and ends at 50095013 of chromosome 19. This promoter set is conserved in the macaque, mouse, rat, horse, cow, pig, dog and zebrafish. No recognizable TATA box, B recognition element (BRE), or CAAT box was found upstream of the predicted transcription start region. Because no clear TATA box was found, it is possible that PRR12 is regulated by a TATA-less promoter containing a downstream promoter element (DPE). However, the predicted DPE is only 15bp downstream of the transcription start region instead of the typical +25 to +32 base pairs. More research will be required to expand the 5' UTR of the PRR12 transcript in order to confirm where the correct promoter region is located.

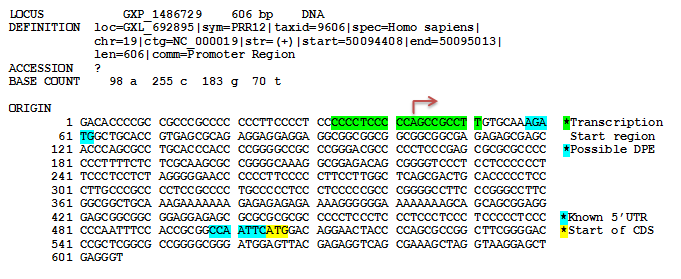
PRR12 Promoter Region as predicted using ElDorado via Genomatix.

== Transcript ==
mRNA sequence

The PRR12 mRNA transcript is 6960 base pairs long and contains several short sequence repeats. The Homo sapiens PRR12 has three isoforms with isoform 3 containing roughly one thousand more amino acid residues than the other isoforms. No 5' UTR is given in the NCBI records for the Homo sapiens PRR12 transcript. However, 7 base pairs of the 5' UTR have been determined in the Papio anubis ortholog. The 3' UTR is 852 base pairs long.

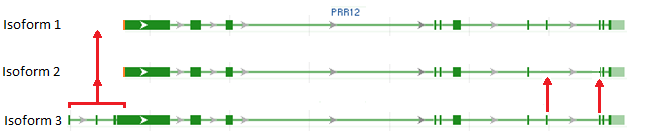
The three isoforms of the human PRR12 protein as listed in the UniProt database. Red arrows indicate where certain exons are partially or entirely not present in isoforms 1 and 2.

== Expression ==
The gene is moderately expressed at even levels in a wide variety of tissue types.

The expression profile of PRR12 in a variety of cell tissue types.

== Protein ==
The PRR12 transcript encodes a protein that is 2036 residues long. It has a molecular weight of 211.1 kdal and an isoelectric point around 7.728. A number of bioinformatics databases have also predicted PRR12 to be a soluble protein with no transmembrane domains. Jianping Chen lists PRR12 as an "extremely vulnerable protein". These proteins have regions rich in amino acids that are "poor protectors" of hydrogen bonds along the backbone of the protein, inhibiting the ability of these proteins to fold properly and allowing the possibility of protein aggregation. Residues such as G, A, S, Y, and P are listed as poor protectors and PRR12 is rich in both proline and glycine. Many of the proline residues are positioned consecutively in regions of low complexity. These regions may give this protein interesting secondary structure as a cluster of proline can form a polyproline helix. PRR12 contains a possible nuclear import signal starting at P1794. A typical nuclear localization sequence would have the following residues: P-P-K-K-K-R-K-V. PRR12 contains a DUF4211 domain starting at V1836 that shows homology to the pfam13926 domain. This domain is well conserved in PRR12 orthologs. PRR12 also contains well conserved AT-hook binding regions at P1168 and G1202. These regions allow proteins to bind DNA, further supporting the localization of PRR12 to the nucleus.

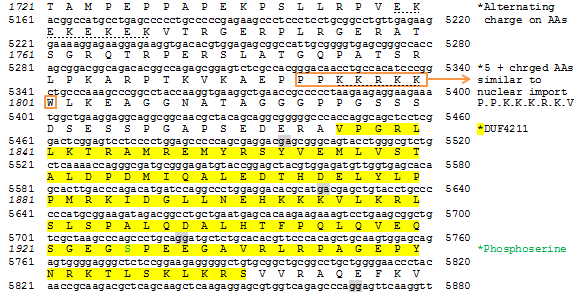
This section of PRR12 shows a possible nuclear import signal outlined in orange. Highlighted in yellow is the DUF4211 that shows homology to pfam13926.

== Conservation ==
=== Paralogs ===
The glutamine and serine-rich protein 1 (QSER1) is the only closely related paralog to PRR12 (NCBI accession: EAW68214). QSER1 has no known function and, like PRR12, it contains DUF4211 and a nuclear localization signal. QSER1 does not contain the AT binding regions or Epstein-Barr virus antigen that is found in PRR12.

=== Orthologs ===
The most distant relative found through BLAST with a significant similarity to PRR12 is the fish Danio rerio. Orthologs were found in fish, amphibians, reptiles, and other mammals. While no PRR12 orthologs were found in birds, birds did have orthologs to the QSER1, which is a close paralog to human PRR12.

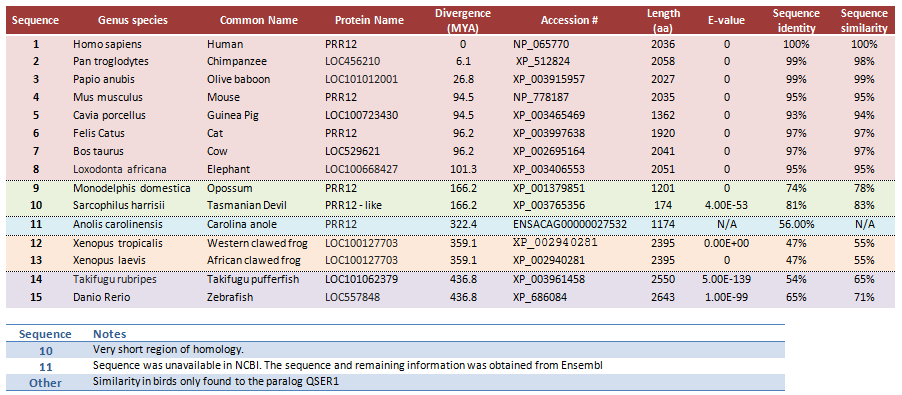

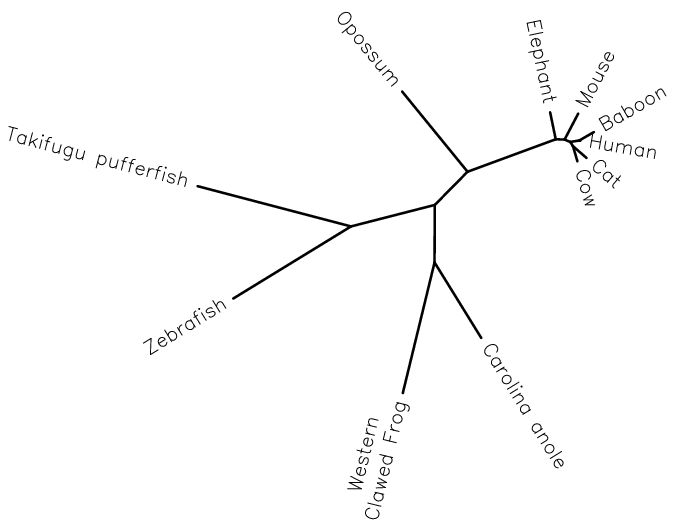
An unrooted phylogenetic map of PRR12 orthologs.

== Clinical importance ==
One study on the Epstein–Barr virus found close homology between a proline rich region in PRR12 and a 65 amino acid long region at the terminal end of EBNA-2 (a nuclear antigen of the virus). This Epstein-Barr virus antigen is associated with autoimmune systemic connective tissue diseases (CTD) including systemic lupus erythematosus (SLE), primary Sjögren syndrome (SS), rheumatoid arthritis (RA), systemic sclerosis (SSc), and secondary SS. PRR12 is not only proline rich, but it is also rich in glycine, suggesting that there might be a relationship to collagen which is also proline and glycine rich. A relationship between the two might be an explanation for the appearance of autoimmune CTDs after infection of EBV. However, glycine and proline residues in collagen generally follow a G-P-X or G-X-HydroxyP motif, which does not significantly occur in PRR12.

Haploinsufficiency of PRR12 can result in anophthalmia among other abnormalities
