= IKZF2 =

Protein-coding gene in the species Homo sapiens

Identifiers
- Aliases: IKZF2, ANF1A2, HELIOS, ZNF1A2, ZNFN1A2, IKAROS family zinc finger 2
- External IDs: OMIM: 606234; MGI: 1342541; GeneCards: IKZF2

Gene location (Human)
Chr.	Chromosome 2 (human)
Band	2q34	Start	212,999,691 bp
Band	2q34	End	213,152,427 bp

Gene location (Mouse)
Chr.	Chromosome 1 (mouse)
Band	1|1 C3	Start	69,570,373 bp
Band	1|1 C3	End	69,726,404 bp
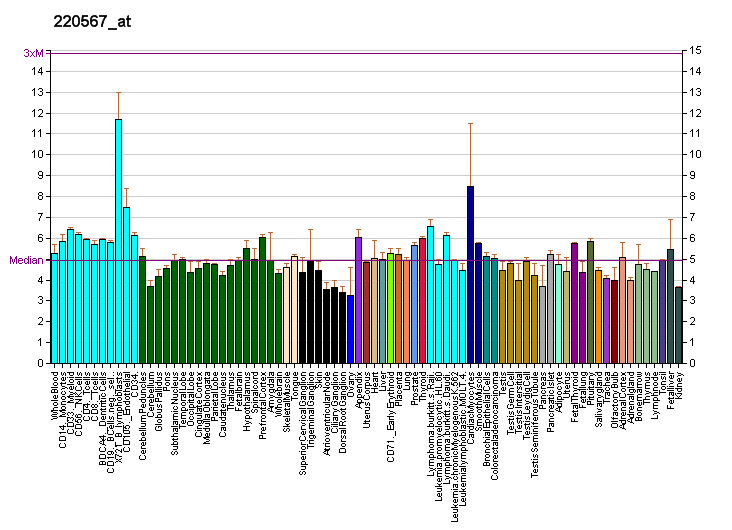
RNA expression pattern
Bgee	Human / Mouse (ortholog); Top expressed in: thymus; palpebral conjunctiva; amniotic fluid; mucosa of pharynx; oral cavity; gingival epithelium; pancreatic epithelial cell; mucosa of paranasal sinus; epithelium of nasopharynx; skin of thigh / Top expressed in: conjunctival fornix; gastrula; submandibular gland; transitional epithelium of urinary bladder; cornea; lobe of prostate; otolith organ; utricle; skin of external ear; vestibular membrane of cochlear duct; More reference expression data
BioGPS	More reference expression data
Gene ontology
Molecular function	DNA-binding transcription factor activity; DNA binding; protein binding; protein homodimerization activity; metal ion binding; protein heterodimerization activity; nucleic acid binding; molecular function; DNA-binding transcription factor activity, RNA polymerase II-specific
Cellular component	nucleus; nucleoplasm
Biological process	regulation of transcription, DNA-templated; transcription, DNA-templated; positive regulation of transcription by RNA polymerase II; negative regulation of transcription by RNA polymerase II; biological process
Sources:Amigo / QuickGO
Orthologs
Databases	NCBI: entry; OMA: entry
Species	Human	Mouse
Entrez	22807	22779
Ensembl	ENSG00000030419	ENSMUSG00000025997
UniProt	Q9UKS7	P81183
RefSeq (mRNA)	NM_001079526; NM_016260; NM_001371274; NM_001371275; NM_001371276 NM_001371277; NM_001387220	NM_011770
RefSeq (protein)	NP_001072994; NP_057344; NP_001358203; NP_001358204; NP_001358205 NP_001358206	NP_035900; NP_001389779; NP_001389781; NP_001389782; NP_001389783 NP_001389784; NP_001389785; NP_001389786
Location (UCSC)	Chr 2: 213 – 213.15 Mb	Chr 1: 69.57 – 69.73 Mb
PubMed search
- Wikidata
View/Edit Human	View/Edit Mouse

Zinc finger protein Helios is a protein that in humans is encoded by the IKZF2 gene. This protein is a member of Ikaros family of transcription factors.

This gene encodes a member of the Ikaros family of zinc-finger proteins. This family of transcription factors consists of five members: Ikaros (Ikzf1), Helios (Ikzf2), Aiolos (Ikzf3), Eos (Ikzf4), and Pegasus (Ikzf5). The Ikaros family members are involved in the hematopoietic development, some to a greater extent than others with Ikaros being expressed in all hematopoietic cells. This protein forms homo- or hetero-dimers with other Ikaros family members. Multiple transcript variants encoding different isoforms have been found for this gene, but the biological relevance of some variants has not been determined.

When these factors are missing or altered, lymphocytes suffer from defective development. Since Ikaros family members can interact with each other, it is probable that when one transcription factor is defective, others can substitute it. Because of this, it is rather difficult to assess precise function to each transcription factor.

== Structure ==
Ikaros family members are characterised by having four N-terminal zinc finger domains, except for Pegasus, which has only three. These are the key domains for DNA binding and stabilization of DNA-protein interactions. They also have C-terminal zinc finger domains which serve as a site for interactions with other proteins and hetero- or homodimerization with other family members.

== Function ==
=== As transcription factor ===
Helios is said to repress interleukin-2 (IL-2) expression in Tregs. This function was also confirmed for Eos, another member of Ikaros family of transcription factors, pointing to their redundant functions. Helios interacts with Foxp3 to lower IL2 gene expression. They form a complex and bind to the IL2 locus causing repressive epigenetic modifications, namely reduced histone H3 acetylation. Loss of Helios causes decreased binding of Foxp3 to the IL2 promoter and milder IL-2 repression.

Helios is also said to be part of the positive feedback loop of IL-2. It positively affects the IL-2Rα-STAT5 pathway. IL-2 maintains Helios expression. IL-2 is probably not the only factor positively affecting Helios expression.

=== As a tumor suppressor ===
Helios is said to also function as a tumor suppressor. Such role of Helios was observed when a dominant negative isoform of this protein, that lacked three out of four N-terminal zinc fingers, was found in adult T cell malignancies. Indeed, forced expression of this isoform of Helios did lead to the development of T cell lymphoma in a murine model. However, the ectopic expression of wildtype Helios in B cells results in lymphomas as well. This suggests that Helios might act as a tumor suppressor only in the cells that it is naturally expressed in, when expressed in other cells, it is rather tumorigenic.

Since Helios-deficient Tregs have the ability to produce IFN-γ and TNF-α, they seem to be useful in anti-tumor responses. Such Treg cells can infiltrate the tumor without keeping their suppressive function, subsequently producing IFN-γ and TNF-α, which could help with slowing the tumor growth. Moreover, the loss of suppressive phenotype of Treg cells was observed in tumors, but not in splenic Tregs, which can potentially have great clinical significance. Based on these findings, Helios could be considered a powerful tool in the anti-tumor therapy. However, it is too early for such conclusion and even though the data seem promising, more research needs to be done in this area.

=== In immune cells ===
Helios is expressed in many mature T lymphocyte populations, however, it is best known for its expression in T regulatory cell (Treg) population.

==== Tregs ====
Treg cells are a population of T cells that can suppress the effector function of other immune cells. We can divide Treg cells into two main subsets: thymus-derived Treg cell (tTreg) and peripherally-induced Treg cell (pTreg). TTregs are the subset of cells that develops in thymus from T lymphocytes that recognise self-antigens. Whereas pTregs are lymphocytes that are induced in the periphery originally from CD4+ Foxp3- cells and which subsequently acquire suppressive function. Both Treg cells subsets are Foxp3+.

Helios is expressed only in 70-80 % of Treg cells in mice and humans. The fact that Helios is not expressed in all Tregs was in the past explained by the observations that Helios could actually be found only in tTregs (Tregs that arise from the thymus), not pTregs. This belief was supported by experimental data, that discovered the expression of Helios only in early Foxp3+ thymocytes or that did not find the expression of Helios in Tregs in the periphery in the first few days. Moreover, experiments generating induced Tregs (iTregs) in vitro, did not find any expression of Helios in the cells. Thus, Helios used to be considered a tTreg marker.

Recently, the idea of Helios as a tTregs specific marker, has become controversial. Current studies indicate that even iTregs can express Helios transcription factor. Thus, it is unclear whether Helios can be used as a marker for tTregs.

Current data suggest that Helios is a marker of Treg stability rather than a specific marker for differentiation between tTregs and pTregs.

It was discovered that Helios is not essential for early development of T cells in thymus, but it is important for Treg suppressive function later in their life. This conclusion was drawn when the loss of Helios in T cells did not have any effect on T cell development and homeostasis of the immune system in a mouse model. However, it did result in a defective immune regulation later in the life with the onset of autoimmunity resulting from defective Treg function.

Tregs that lack Helios have lower expression of Foxp3 and lower activation of STAT5. Helios-deficient Tregs also seem to produce effector cytokines that are not usually produced by this cell type – interleukin 17 (IL-17), interferon gamma (IFN-γ) and tumor necrosis factor alpha (TNF-α). Thus, this suggests that Helios is important for the identity of Treg cell and stability of their cytokine profile. It is important to mention, that so far we do not have enough knowledge about the mechanism of Helios keeping Treg stability and even about Helios's own expression in Tregs. Thus, there is a need to uncover the mechanism behind these findings.

==== In other immune cells ====
Beside CD4+ Tregs, Helios is also expressed in murine NK cells. In this immune cell subset, Helios is expressed early during their development, and it is later downregulated.

Helios is also expressed in CD8+ regulatory T cells. Helios maintains their suppressive function similarly to the CD4+ Tregs.
