= Keratohyalin =

Keratohyalin is a protein structure found in cytoplasmic granules of the keratinocytes in the stratum granulosum of the epidermis. Keratohyalin granules (KHG) mainly consist of keratin, profilaggrin, loricrin and trichohyalin proteins which contribute to cornification or keratinization, the process of the formation of epidermal cornified cell envelope. During the keratinocyte differentiation, these granules maturate and expand in size, which leads to the conversion of keratin tonofilaments into a homogenous keratin matrix, an important step in cornification.

Keratohyalin granules can be divided in three classes: globular KHG (found in quickly dividing epithelia, such as the oral mucose), stellate KHG (found in the slowly dividing normal epidermis) and KHG of Hassall's corpuscles or type VI epithelioreticular cells of the thymus gland. The exact purpose of the keratinization of Hassall's corpuscles remains unknown.

During skin differentiation process, keratohyaline granules discharge their contents in the junction between stratum granulosum and stratum corneum cell layers and form the barrier. At the same time, the inner side of the cell membrane thickens forming the cornified cell envelope. After the release of the granules, nuclei, ribosomes and mitochondria disappear, the cells become densely packaged with filaggrin and cover more surface. After final dehydration, the cell desquamates.

Keratohyalin granules contribute significantly to the process of skin moisturization, albeit indirectly. As keratinocytes differentiate and move towards the surface of the skin, they release keratohyalin granules, which contain filaggrin. Filaggrin is then chemically modified and proteolytically processed to form natural moisturizing factor (NMF). NMF is composed of hygroscopic (water-attracting) amino acids and derivatives, which help the stratum corneum, the outermost layer of the skin, to retain moisture. Additionally, NMF serves as a UV protectant and modulates the pH of the stratum corneum, both critical functions for skin health.
