= Stratum granulosum =

Cell layer in the epidermis

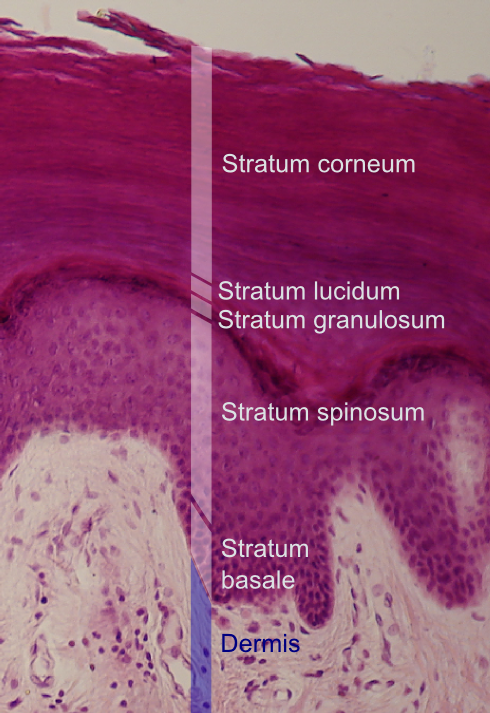
Histologic image showing a section of epidermis. Stratum granulosum labeled near center.

The stratum granulosum (or granular layer) is a thin layer of cells in the epidermis lying above the stratum spinosum and below the stratum corneum (stratum lucidum on the soles and palms). Keratinocytes migrating from the underlying stratum spinosum become known as granular cells in this layer. These cells contain keratohyalin granules, which are filled with histidine- and cysteine-rich proteins that appear to bind the keratin filaments together. Therefore, the main function of keratohyalin granules is to bind intermediate keratin filaments together.

At the transition between this layer and the stratum corneum, cells secrete lamellar bodies (containing lipids and proteins) into the extracellular space. This results in the formation of the hydrophobic lipid envelope responsible for the skin's barrier properties. Concomitantly, cells lose their nuclei and organelles.

== Additional images ==
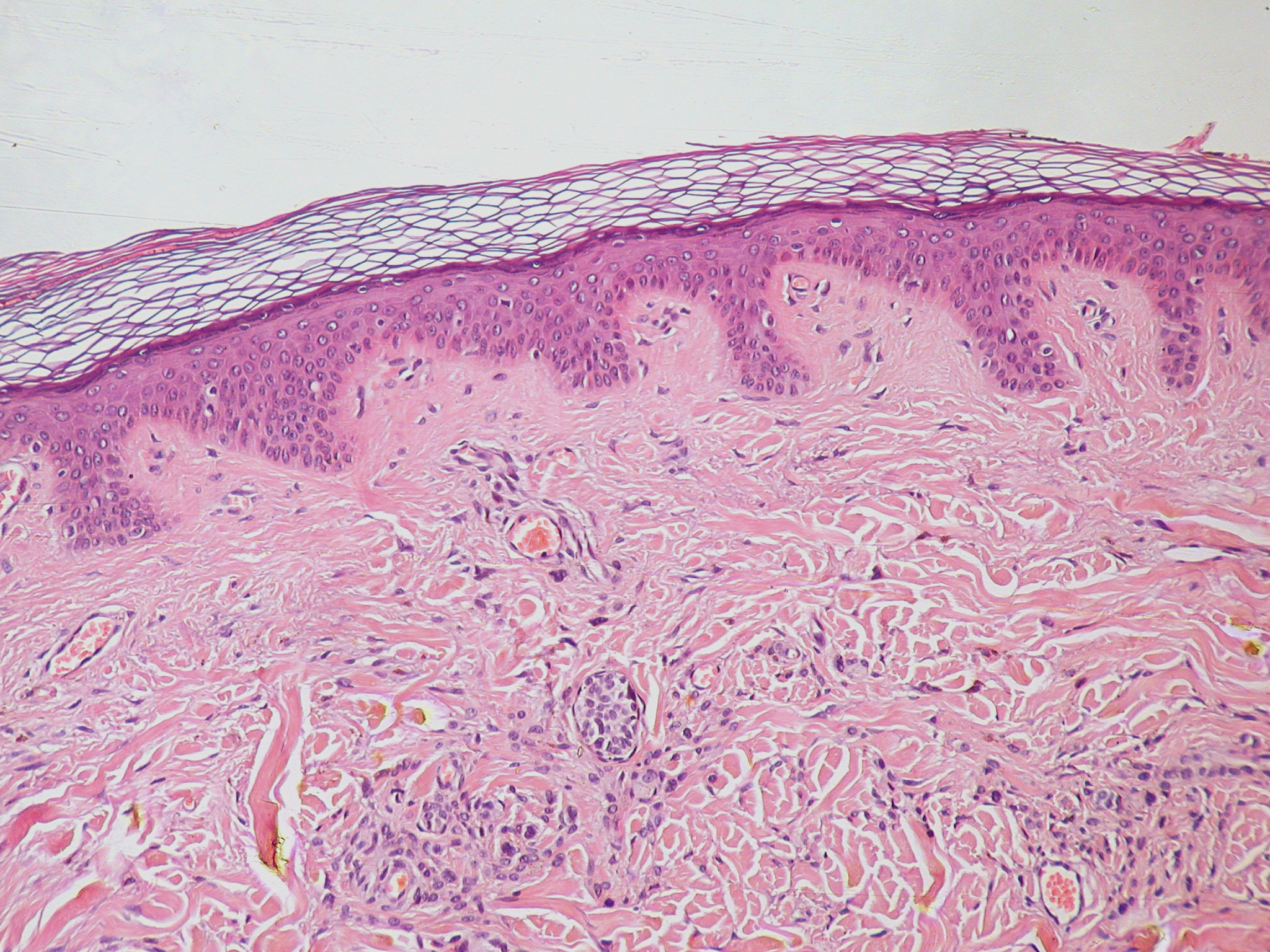
Epidermis and dermis of human skin

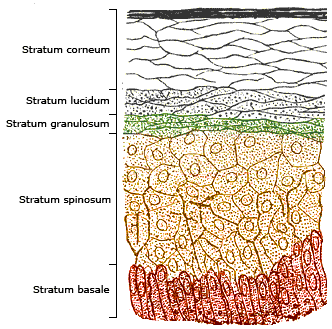
Section of epidermis

== See also ==
- List of keratins expressed in the human integumentary system
