= Promiscuous gene expression =

Promiscuous gene expression (PGE), formerly referred to as ectopic expression, is a process specific to the thymus that plays a pivotal role in the establishment of central tolerance. This phenomenon enables generation of self-antigens, so called tissue-restricted antigens (TRAs), which are in the body expressed only by one or few specific tissues (antigens rank among TRAs if they are expressed by less than five tissues from the sixty tested). These antigens are represented for example by insulin from the pancreas or defensins from the gastrointestinal tract. Antigen-presenting cells (APCs) of the thymus, namely medullary thymic epithelial cells (mTECs), dendritic cells (DCs) and B cells are capable to present peptides derived from TRAs to developing T cells (thymus is the major origin of T cell development) and hereby test, whether their T cell receptors (TCRs) engage self entities and therefore their occurrence in the body can potentially lead to the development of autoimmune disease. In that case, thymic APCs either induce apoptosis in these autoreactive T cells (negative selection) or they deviate them to become T regulatory cells (Treg selection), which suppress self-reactive T cells in the body that escaped negative selection in the thymus. Thus, PGE is crucial for tissues protection against autoimmunity.

== Characteristics of PGE in distinct cell types ==
The usual level of gene expression in the peripheral tissues (e.g. spleen, kidney, liver etc.) reaches about 60% of the mouse coding genome. Some peripheral tissues, including lungs, brain and testis, reveal the repertoire of expressed genes about 10% broader. Importantly, PGE in the thymus, which is mediated by unique subset of epithelial cells called mTECs, triggers expression of vast majority of the genes from the whole genome (~85%). Such a broad repertoire of expressed genes wasn't shown in any other tissue of the body.

=== mTECs ===
The process of PGE in the thymus was discovered in late 80's however, it took a decade to find that the cell subset that mediates PGE and therefore provides a "library" of TRAs are mTECs. These cells were shown to uniquely express a protein called autoimmune regulator (Aire), which drives the expression of approximately 40% TRAs, referred to as Aire-dependent, and is so far the only well characterized driver of PGE. Defects in the expression of Aire lead to multiorgan autoimmunity in mice and cause a severe autoimmune syndrome called APECED in human. Because Aire is not the exclusive PGE regulator, more than half of TRAs are Aire-independent and it isn't still known how their PGE is orchestrated.

mTECs are very heterogenous population and at least should be subdivided to MHCII low expressing subset (mTECsLO) and MHCII high expressing subset (mTECsHI) which is considered to be mature. Aire is expressed only by 30% from the latter.

PGE was found to act in a stochastic manner, which means that each mTEC expresses distinct set of Aire-dependent and Aire-independent TRAs. Despite its stochasticity, TRAs are co-expressed in clusters which however, rather mirror their co-localization on chromosomes than co-expression patterns from particular tissues. Even though TRAs involved in each cluster were found to be consistent, the PGE of whole cluster is transient and changes during mTEC development. Moreover, these clusters are highly variable between individuals. PGE is distinct from the expression of TRAs in the peripheral tissues also by its monoallelic or biallelic course. On the other hand, the level of TRA expression and numbers of alternative-splicing protein variants in the thymus correspond to the peripheral tissues.

PGE is highly conserved between mice and human.

=== B cells ===
Although thymic B cells were shown to induce either negative selection or Treg selection, their importance for the establishment of central tolerance remains elusive. It is assumed however, that B cells in the thymus are licensed by CD40-CD40L interaction with autoreactive T cells to activate the expression of Aire and upregulate levels of MHCII and CD80. Moreover, Aire drives the PGE of Aire-dependent TRAs in B cells and because their repertoire is non-overlapping with that of mTECs it should broaden the scope of peripheral antigens displayed in the thymus.

=== PGE in the periphery ===
Except the thymus, Aire is expressed also in the periphery, namely in the secondary lymphoid organs. However, the search for particular Aire-expressing cell type still continues due to conflicting results. What seems to be clear is that these cells express Aire-dependent TRAs, that are distinct from those in mTECs. In line with their high expression of MHCII and very limited expression of costimulatory molecules, these cells were shown to establish tolerance by inactivation of autoreactive T cells rather than inducing apoptosis in them.

== Master-regulators of PGE ==
=== Aire and its partners ===
Aire is not classical transcription factor, because instead of recognition of specific consensus sequences, Aire seeks after genes marked by specific histone marks, such as the absence of H3K4me3 and presence of H3K27me3, which indicate transcriptionally inactive chromatin. This type of gene recognition logically explains the high numbers of genes whose expression is affected by Aire. There is available also alternative explanation, that Aire recognizes silenced chromatin thanks to interaction with molecular complex ATF7ip- MBD1 which binds methylated CpG di-nucleotides.

After the recognition of Aire dependent genes, Aire recruits topoisomerase II to perform double-strand DNA breaks at their transcriptional start sites (TSSs). These brakes attract DNA PK and other DNA damage response proteins which relax the surrounding chromatin and repair the breaks. Subsequently, Aire recruits elongation complex p-TEFb to the TSSs, which releases stalled RNA II polymerases and therefore activates transcription (PGE) of Aire-dependent genes. Interaction between Aire and p-TEFb is enabled by another partner molecule Brd4, which stabilizes this molecular complex.

Altogether, Aire requires around fifty partner molecules to properly activate PGE. Among these molecules further rank acetylase Creb-binding protein (CBP), which enhances stability of Aire, however dampens its transactivation properties and deacetylase Sirtuin 1 (Sirt1), which is essential for activation of PGE of Aire-dependent TRAs. Worth mentioning is also Hipk2, which phosphorylates Aire and CBP however, its absence affects mostly PGE of Aire-independent genes, suggesting that this kinase might cooperate with other unknown transcriptional regulator.

Recently, molecular complexes of Aire and its partners were shown to localize to specific parts of chromatin called super-enhancers.

By contrast, little is known about transcription of Aire itself. Nevertheless, several studies suggest that major role in triggering of Aire expression plays NF-κB signaling pathway, similarly as in the development of mTECs. Aire expression and PGE of Aire-dependent TRAs is also affected by sex hormones. Androgens enhance these processes, whereas impact by estrogens is completely opposite and results in less efficient PGE.

=== Fezf2 ===
Fezf2 (forebrain embryonic zinc-finger-like protein 2) was recently discovered as the second regulator of PGE. Even though little is known about its operation in the thymus, Fezf2, in marked contrast with Aire, plays role in different physiological processes than central tolerance, e.g. development of the brain, and acts as a classical transcription factor. In the thymus however, Fezf2 is expressed by nearly 80% of mTECs and not other cells. The repertoire of TRAs involved in Fezf2-driven PGE is nonoverlapping with that of Aire and comprises genes previously defined as Aire-independent, e.g. Fabp9 (TRA of testis). This fact is also bolstered by different manifestations of autoimmunity in Fezf2 knockout mouse, in comparison with Aire KO mouse.

The expression of Fezf2 was found to be independent on Aire however, was found to be triggered also by the receptor of NF-κB signaling pathway, namely by LtβR.

The expression of Aire and Fezf2 was found to be upregulated after mTEC adhesion to developing T cells which points to the fact that functional PGE requires direct contact with T cells.
