= IKZF4 =

Human gene

Identifiers
- Aliases: IKZF4, EOS, ZNFN1A4, IKAROS family zinc finger 4
- External IDs: OMIM: 606239; MGI: 1343139; GeneCards: IKZF4
Available structures
PDB	Ortholog search: PDBe RCSB
PDB	List of PDB id codes 2MA7

Gene location (Human)
Chr.	Chromosome 12 (human)
Band	12q13.2	Start	56,007,659 bp
Band	12q13.2	End	56,038,435 bp

Gene location (Mouse)
Chr.	Chromosome 10 (mouse)
Band	10|10 D3	Start	128,466,712 bp
Band	10|10 D3	End	128,505,227 bp
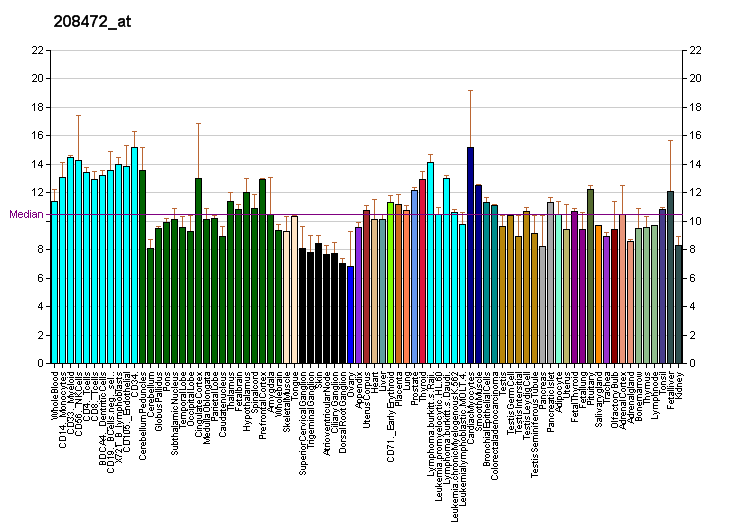
RNA expression pattern
Bgee	Human / Mouse (ortholog); Top expressed in: buccal mucosa cell; left adrenal gland; adrenal cortex; left adrenal cortex; right adrenal gland; inferior ganglion of vagus nerve; muscle of thigh; right adrenal cortex; testicle; gastrocnemius muscle / Top expressed in: Rostral migratory stream; secondary oocyte; zygote; primary oocyte; medulla of thymus; female urethra; trigeminal ganglion; suprachiasmatic nucleus; supraoptic nucleus; yolk sac; More reference expression data
BioGPS	More reference expression data
Gene ontology
Molecular function	DNA-binding transcription factor activity; nucleic acid binding; sequence-specific DNA binding; DNA binding; bHLH transcription factor binding; protein homodimerization activity; metal ion binding; protein heterodimerization activity; zinc ion binding; protein domain specific binding; DNA-binding transcription factor activity, RNA polymerase II-specific
Cellular component	nucleus; nucleoplasm; nuclear body; protein-containing complex
Biological process	negative regulation of transcription, DNA-templated; regulation of transcription, DNA-templated; transcription, DNA-templated; positive regulation of transcription by RNA polymerase II; protein homooligomerization; protein heterooligomerization
Sources:Amigo / QuickGO
Orthologs
Databases	NCBI: entry; OMA: entry
Species	Human	Mouse
Entrez	64375	22781
Ensembl	ENSG00000123411	ENSMUSG00000002578
UniProt	Q9H2S9	Q8C208
RefSeq (mRNA)	NM_022465; NM_001351089; NM_001351090; NM_001351091; NM_001351092	NM_011772; NM_001358536; NM_001358537
RefSeq (protein)	NP_071910; NP_001338018; NP_001338019; NP_001338020; NP_001338021	NP_035902; NP_001345465; NP_001345466
Location (UCSC)	Chr 12: 56.01 – 56.04 Mb	Chr 10: 128.47 – 128.51 Mb
PubMed search
- Wikidata
View/Edit Human	View/Edit Mouse

Zinc finger protein Eos is a protein that in humans is encoded by the IKZF4 gene.

Members of the Ikaros (ZNFN1A1; MIM 603023) family of transcription factors, which includes Eos, are expressed in lymphocytes and are implicated in the control of lymphoid development.[supplied by OMIM]

== Interactions ==
IKZF4 has been shown to interact with CTBP1 and IKZF1.
