= Medullary thymic epithelial cells =

A figure depicting the process of T cell / thymocyte positive and negative selection in the thymus. mTEC shown in orange.

Medullary thymic epithelial cells (mTECs) represent a unique stromal cell population of the thymus which plays an essential role in the establishment of central tolerance. Therefore, mTECs rank among cells relevant for the development of functional mammal immune system.

T cell precursors rise in bone marrow and migrate through the bloodstream to the thymus for further development. During their maturation in the thymus, they undergo a process called V(D)J recombination which conducts the development of T cell receptors (TCRs). The mechanism of this stochastic process enables on one hand the generation of vast repertoire of TCRs, however, on the other hand causes also origin of so called "autoreactive T cells" which recognize self antigens via their TCRs. Autoreactive T cells must be eliminated from the body or skewed into the T Regulatory cells (TRegs) lineage to prevent manifestations of autoimmunity. mTECs possess the ability to deal with these autoreactive clones via mediation of the processes of central tolerance, namely clonal deletion or T regulatory cells selection, respectively.

N.B.: All the below cited references utilized mouse as a model organism.

== Self-antigens generation and presentation ==
In 1989, two scientific groups came up with the hypothesis that the thymus expresses genes which are in the periphery, strictly expressed by specific tissues (e.g.: Insulin produced by β cells of the pancreas) to subsequently present these so-called "tissue-restricted antigens" (TRAs) from almost all parts of the body to developing T cells in order to test which TCRs recognize self-tissues and can be therefore harmful to the body. It was found, after more than a decade, that this phenomenon is managed specifically by mTECs in the thymus and was named Promiscuous gene expression (PGE).

=== Autoimmune regulator ===
Aire is a protein called autoimmune regulator (Aire) which is also specifically expressed by mTECs. and its expression is completely dependent on NF- kappa B signaling pathway. Aire recognizes target genes of TRAs via specific methylation marks and requires about 50 partner molecules for activation of their expression. Moreover, Aire-dependent activation of TRA genes expression is accompanied by formation of DNA double-strand breaks. which probably results in very short lifespan of mTECs between 2–3 days

Mutations of Aire gene in human cause a rare autoimmune disorder called Autoimmune Polyendocrinopathy Candidiasis Ectodermal Distrophy (APECED)., which usually manifests in combination with other autoimmune diseases e.g.: diabetes mellitus type 1. Dysfunction of murine Aire gene results in comparable scenario and therefore mouse is used as the model organism for investigation of APECED.

=== mTECs in numbers ===
mTECs as a population are capable to express more than 19000 genes (about 80% of mouse genome) among which approximately 4000 belong to Aire-dependent TRAs. It is important to emphasize that single mTEC expresses about 150 Aire-dependent TRAs and approximately 600 Aire-independent TRAs, indicating that other still unknown PGE regulators exist. Indeed, another protein called Fezf2 was suggested to be the second regulator of PGE.

It was shown that each mTEC expresses stochastically 1-3% of TRA pool. However, more recent studies discovered stable co-expression patterns between TRA genes which are localized in close proximity, suggesting "order in this stochastic process".

== Tissues protection against autoreactive T cells ==
T cell precursors extravasate from the bloodstream in cortico-medullary junction and they first migrate to the thymic cortex, where they undergo construction of TCRs and subsequently a process called T cell positive selection which is mediated by mTEC-related cells: cortical thymic epithelial cells (cTECs). This process verifies, whether newly generated TCRs are functional. About 90% of T cells displays badly rearranged TCRs, they cannot reach the positive selection and they die by neglect in the cortex. The rest starts to express CCR7, which is a receptor for mTEC-generated chemokine CCL21, and migrate after concentration gradient to the thymic medulla to encounter mTECs.

=== Two modes of central tolerance ===
mTECs are not only mediators of PGE and "factories of TRAs". They also express high levels of MHC II and costimulatory molecules CD80/CD86 and rank among efficient antigen-presenting cells (APCs). Moreover, they utilize macroautophagy to load self antigens on MHCII molecules. Thus, mTECs are capable to present self-generated TRAs on their MHC molecules to select potential autoreactive T cells. It was published that mTECs mediate clonal deletion (recessive tolerance), via presentation of TRAs, which leads to the apoptosis of autoreactive T cells, as well as they are competent to skew autoreactive T cells into TRegs, also through the presentation of TRAs, which then migrate to the periphery to protect tissues against autoreactive T cells that occasionally avoid selection processes in the thymus (dominant tolerance).

How mTECs discriminate between these two modes of tolerance? It was shown that prospective TRegs interact with presented TRAs with lower affinity than those which are clonally deleted. Furthermore, it was also revealed that specific TRAs skew autoreactive T cells into TRegs with much higher efficiency than they do in the case of clonal deletion.

=== Antigen transfer in the thymus ===
mTECs form rare population which is composed of approximately 100000 cells per thymus of 2-week-old mice. Thus, there is low probability of encounter between autoreactive T cell and mTEC. Unidirectional antigen transfer from mTECs to thymic dendritic cells (DCs), which itself can't express TRAs, extends the network of TRA presentation, enables TRA processing by different microenvironments and increases the probability of encounter between autoreactive T cell and its appropriate self-antigen. Moreover, DCs competently induce both recessive and dominant tolerance as well as mTECs.

In contrast, another seminal study reveals that mTECs itself suffice to establish both recessive and dominant tolerance without help of additional APCs.

== Development ==
=== Subsets ===
mTEC population is not homogenous and basically could be subdivided into more numerous population of mTECs which express low number of MHCII and CD80/CD86, namely mTECs^{Lo} and smaller population of mTECs^{Hi} which express higher amounts of these molecules. PGE regulator Aire is expressed only by part of mTECs^{Hi}. However, this claim does not mean that mTECs^{Lo} don't contribute to PGE, mTECs^{Hi}, especially that expressing Aire, are just much more efficient in this process.

There is evidence that mTECs^{Lo} serve as precursors of mTECs^{Hi} in the embryonic thymus Nevertheless, situation changes after birth, where only part of mTECs^{Lo} pool represents immature mTECs^{Hi} reservoir and another part is constituted by mature mTECs which are specialized for expression of chemokine CCL21, discussed above. Further subset of mTECs^{Lo} pool is formed by terminally differentiated cells called Post- Aire mTECs which already downregulated the expression of Aire, MHCII and CD80/CD86.

mTECs can develop into Thymic mimetic cells, which combine the mTEC identity with lineage specific transcription factors. These cells exhibit the phenotype of differentiated peripheral cells and produce their corresponding TRAs. The most famous example is Hassall's corpuscles.

=== Progenitor cells ===
TECs (mTECs and cTECs) originate from the third pharyngeal pouch which is a product of endoderm. Their common origin points to the fact that both mTECs and cTECs rise from one bipotent progenitor. This notion was confirmed by several studies of embryonic thymus. and was further developed by finding that these bipotent progenitors express cTEC markers. Nevertheless, another sources document existence of mTEC unipotent progenitors that express claudin 3 and 4 (Cld3/4). These two opposite findings were interfaced by observation of unipotent mTEC progenitors in the postnatal thymus that previously expressed cTEC markers and concurrently express Cld3/4. On the other hand, several other studies describe appearance of bipotent progenitors in postnatal thymus. Thus, embryonic as well as postnatal thymus might shelter both bipotent TEC or unipotent mTEC progenitors.

Similarly to Aire expression, mTECs development is highly dependent on NF- kappa B signaling pathway.
