= NOSIP =

Protein-coding gene in the species Homo sapiens

Identifiers
- Aliases: NOSIP, CGI-25, nitric oxide synthase interacting protein
- External IDs: OMIM: 616759; MGI: 1913644; GeneCards: NOSIP
Enzyme activity
EC #	BRENDA	ExPASy	KEGG	MetaCyc
2.3.2.27	↗	↗	↗	↗

Gene location (Human)
Chr.	Chromosome 19 (human)
Band	19q13.33	Start	49,555,468 bp
Band	19q13.33	End	49,590,262 bp

Gene location (Mouse)
Chr.	Chromosome 7 (mouse)
Band	7|7 B3	Start	44,711,853 bp
Band	7|7 B3	End	44,727,634 bp
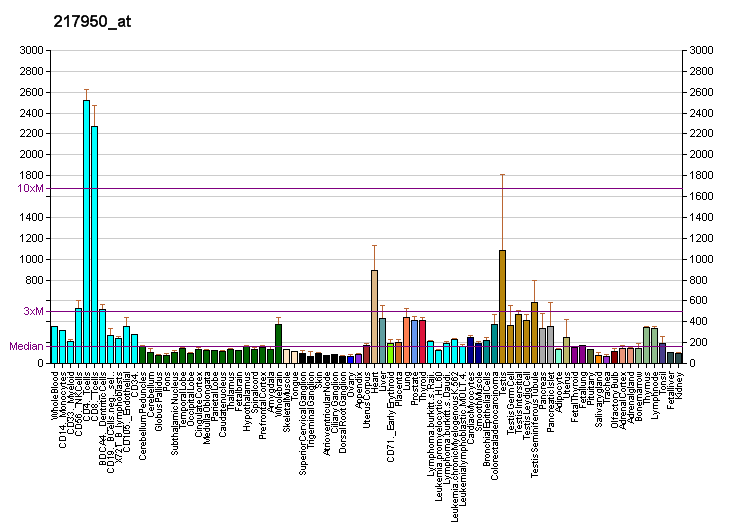
RNA expression pattern
Bgee	Human / Mouse (ortholog); Top expressed in: left testis; granulocyte; right testis; body of pancreas; triceps brachii muscle; muscle of thigh; blood; mucosa of transverse colon; tendon of biceps brachii; glutes / Top expressed in: spermatid; spermatocyte; interventricular septum; lip; blastocyst; genital tubercle; granulocyte; otic vesicle; epiblast; neural layer of retina; More reference expression data
BioGPS	More reference expression data
Gene ontology
Molecular function	protein binding; transferase activity; RNA binding; ubiquitin protein ligase activity
Cellular component	cytoplasm; cytosol; Golgi membrane; nucleus
Biological process	negative regulation of catalytic activity; negative regulation of nitric-oxide synthase activity; multicellular organism development; protein ubiquitination; regulation of nitric-oxide synthase activity
Sources:Amigo / QuickGO
Orthologs
Databases	NCBI: entry; OMA: entry
Species	Human	Mouse
Entrez	51070	66394
Ensembl	ENSG00000142546	ENSMUSG00000003421
UniProt	Q9Y314	Q9D6T0
RefSeq (mRNA)	NM_001270960; NM_015953; NM_001363649	NM_001163684; NM_025533
RefSeq (protein)	NP_001257889; NP_057037; NP_001350578	NP_001157156; NP_079809
Location (UCSC)	Chr 19: 49.56 – 49.59 Mb	Chr 7: 44.71 – 44.73 Mb
PubMed search
- Wikidata
View/Edit Human	View/Edit Mouse

Nitric oxide synthase-interacting protein is an enzyme that in humans is encoded by the NOSIP gene.
