= Thymic mimetic cells =

Thymic mimetic cells are a heterogeneous population of cells located in the thymus that exhibit phenotypes of a wide variety of differentiated peripheral cells. They arise from medullary thymic epithelial cells (mTECs) and also function in negative selection of self-reactive T cells.

== History ==
Some subsets of these cells were observed as early as the mid-1800s because of their distinct, seemingly misplaced, phenotype. The most readily observed subsets were those accumulating and forming microscopic structures, most notably Hassall's corpuscles resembling skin keratinocytes. Many subsets with a more dispersed distribution were found later. Substantial progress has been made in recent years owing to the rapid development of single cell sequencing methods, such as scRNA-seq or scATAC-seq.

== Diversity ==
Although thymic mimetic cells exhibit transcriptional programmes of cells from other tissues, they are not identical to them and share a part of their gene expression with mTECs from which they arise. The entire range of phenotypes as well as the pathways that lead to them are still in need of further research. A recent review recognizes (based on expression of lineage specific transcription factors and cell products) the following subtypes: Basal (skin/lung) mTEC, Enterocyte/hepatocyte mTEC, Ciliated mTEC, Ionocyte mTEC, Keratinocyte mTEC, Microfold mTEC, Muscle mTEC, Neuroendocrine mTEC, Parathyroid mTEC, Secretory mTEC, Thyroid mTEC, Tuft mTEC.

== Function ==
Since its discovery in 2001, AIRE (Autoimmune regulator) has been the main focus of studies of thymic (central) immune tolerance. AIRE induces the expression of many antigens specific to differentiated cells not found in the thymus (termed peripheral tissue antigens or tissue restricted antigens) thus helping to detect and remove T cells that react with these antigens. The mechanism of AIRE is complicated and there are reasons to believe that it is not the sole mechanism of TRA (tissue restricted antigen) expression. AIRE is not sequence specific making its action stochastic and not well targeted, TRAs can also be detected in cells with AIRE knocked out and patients with AIRE deficiency (APS-1) share some autoimmune symptoms but can have other symptoms which are not shared by most.

The expression of peripheral antigens in mimetic cells strongly implies a function in establishing central immune tolerance. This has been reported but further studies are needed. It is unknown what prompts the mTECs to differentiate into mimetic cells, the lineage specific transcription factors could be induced by AIRE or perhaps other signals. Lineage specific transcription factors expressed by some mimetic cell subtypes have been associated with autoimmune disorders.

In addition, some mimetic cells can shape the environment and function of the thymus by producing cytokines.
