= Hassall's corpuscles =

Structures in the human thymus

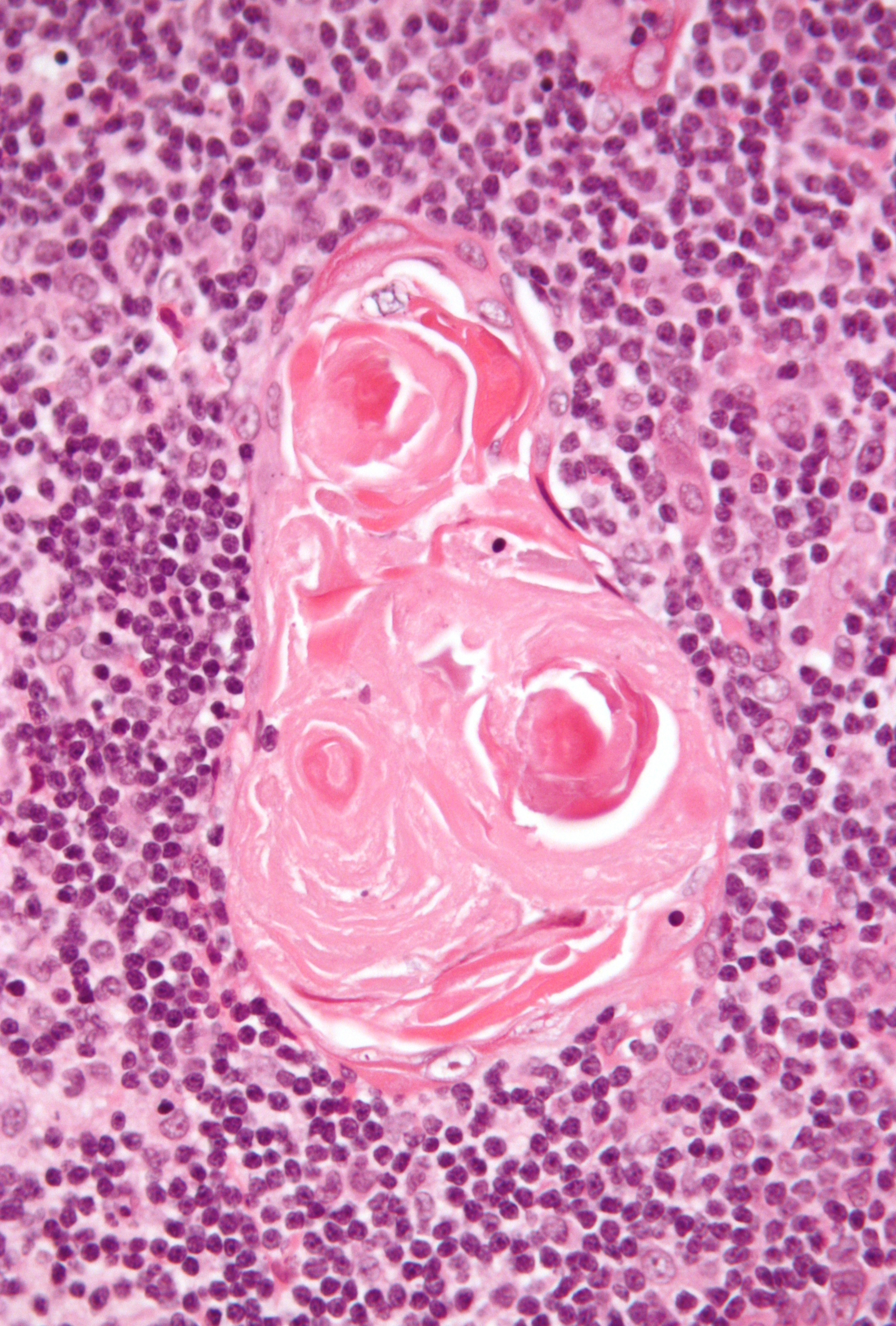
- Micrograph of a thymic corpuscle; H&E stain.

Details
- Part of: Medulla of thymus

Hassall's corpuscles (also known as thymic bodies) are structures found in the medulla of the human thymus, formed from eosinophilic type VI thymic epithelial cells arranged concentrically. These concentric corpuscles are composed of a central mass, consisting of one or more granular cells, and of a capsule formed of epithelioid cells. They vary in size with diameters from 20 to more than 100 μm, and tend to grow larger with age. They can be spherical or ovoid and their epithelial cells contain keratohyalin and bundles of cytoplasmic fibres. Later studies indicate that Hassall's corpuscles differentiate from medullary thymic epithelial cells after they lose autoimmune regulator (AIRE) expression. This makes them an example of Thymic mimetic cells. They are named for Arthur Hill Hassall, who discovered them in 1846.

The function of Hassall's corpuscles is currently unclear, and the absence of this structure in the thymus of most murine species (except for the New Zealand White Mouse strain) has previously restricted mechanistic dissection. It is known that Hassall's corpuscles are a potent source of the cytokine TSLP. In vitro, TSLP directs the maturation of dendritic cells, and increases the ability of dendritic cells to convert naive thymocytes to a Foxp3+ regulatory T cell lineage. It is unknown if this is the physiological function of Hassall's corpuscles in vivo.

In the past decade, researchers found tissue-specific self-antigens in Hassall's corpuscles and revealed their role in the pathogenesis of diseases such as type 1 diabetes, rheumatoid arthritis, multiple sclerosis, autoimmune thyroiditis, Goodpasture's syndrome, and others. They also discovered that Hassall's corpuscles synthesize chemokines affecting different cell populations in thymic medulla. Despite this, the information on the relationship between Hassall's corpuscles with other cell types of thymic medulla (dendritic, myoid, neuroendocrine cells, thymocytes, macrophages, eosinophils, etc.) remains insufficient and often contradictory. Mechanisms of these relationships and their functional significance are still unclear. The lack of such data does not allow a systemic view of the differentiation processes in the thymus.
